= Agriculture in Florida =

Agriculture plays a major role in the history and economy of the American state of Florida. Florida's relatively warm climate gives it a competitive position for many markets in the United States. Florida once produced the majority of citrus fruit grown in the United States and is particularly well known for its oranges which are primarily processed into orange juice, however California produces more citrus than Florida today, with Florida accounting for only 17% of the US crop in 2024. Bell peppers, tomatoes, sugarcane, peaches, strawberries, and watermelons are also important crops. Florida produces a small amount of grape wine.

Labor issues have been a part of the industry since colonization with a history of first slave and then exploited labor. The agricultural industry is a major water user in Florida and overall the industry has a significant impact on Florida's environment including the Everglades.

== Major Crops ==
=== Citrus ===
Bottled Sunshine...A Juicy Story (1968)

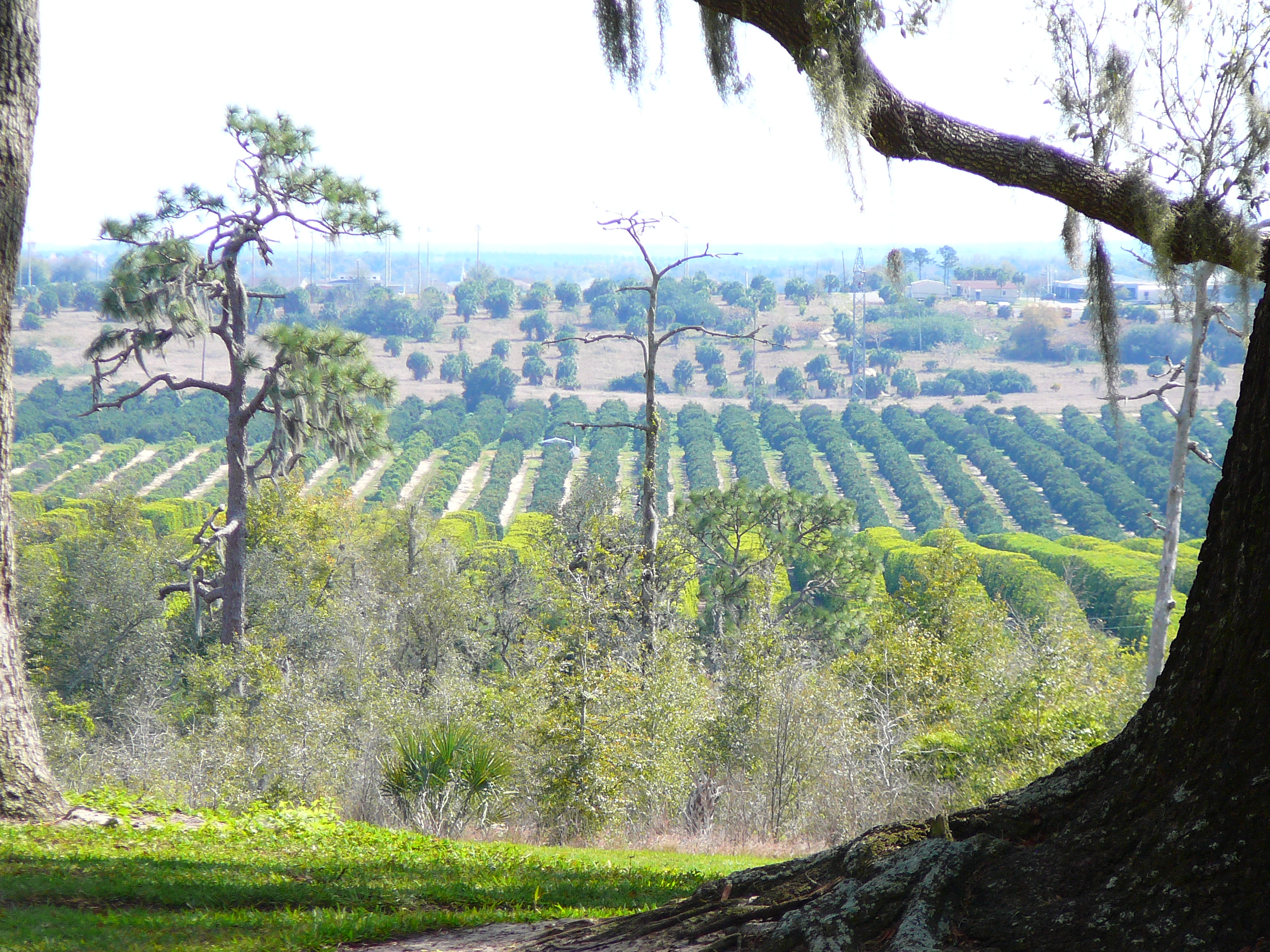
Citrus groves in Florida seen from the Bok Tower Gardens in 2008

Although citrus cultivation began there in the 1500s, commercial scale production was only attempted in the 1920s. At first this went badly due to severe pest and disease epidemics, which were themselves due to poor understanding of the local climate and terrain. During World War II, American soldiers rejected vitamin C-packed lemon crystals because of their unappetizing taste. Thus the US government searched for a food that would fulfill the nutritional needs of the soldiers, have a desirable taste, and prevent diseases such as scurvy. The US federal government and the Florida Department of Citrus worked with a group of scientists to develop a product superior to the canned orange juice available in the 1940s. The result was frozen concentrated orange juice; this was not until three years after the war had ended.

By 1949, orange juice processing plants in Florida were producing over 10 million gallons of concentrated orange juice. Consumers liked concentrated canned orange juice as it was affordable, tasty, convenient, and high in vitamin C. The preparation was simple: empty the container of frozen concentrate into a measured volume of water and stir. However, by the 1980s, food scientists developed a fresher-tasting juice known as reconstituted ready-to-serve juice. Eventually in the 1990s, "not from concentrate" (NFC) orange juice was developed. Orange juice is a common breakfast beverage in the United States.

Due to the importance of oranges to the economy of Florida, "the juice obtained from mature oranges of the species Citrus sinensis and hybrids thereof" was adopted as the official beverage of Florida in 1967.

The kumquat was introduced to Florida in the late 1800s. The most common variety of kumquat planted in Florida is the Nagami. Dade City hosts the annual Kumquat Festival. The festival features kumquat pie, a specialty of Pasco County where Dade City is located.

As of July 2025, oranges make up 88% of Florida's citrus production, followed by 9% for grapefruit and 3% for tangerines and mandarins. For 2018, 10.9% of all cash receipts were citruses. In 2006, 67% of all citrus, 74% of oranges, 58% of tangerines, and 54% of grapefruit were grown in Florida. About 95% of commercial orange production in the state is destined for processing (mostly as orange juice, the official state beverage). The top 5 citrus-producing counties, according to data in 2019, was "DeSoto (12.8 million boxes), Polk (12.5 million boxes), Highlands (10.8 million boxes), Hendry (10.5 million boxes) and Hardee (8.16 million boxes)", according to Florida Agriculture by the Numbers. Together they contribute 71% of Florida's total citrus production. The Central produced the most citrus, followed by the Western area and the Southern areas. International citrus fresh fruit exports totaled to "2.05 million 4/5 bushel cartons", and Japan received the majority of the grapefruit exports. Canada received most of Florida's orange and tangerine exports. Florida Agriculture by the Numbers reports "4.70 million gallons of Frozen Concentrated Orange Juice (FCOJ), and 0.38 million gallons of Frozen Concentrated Grapefruit Juice (FCGJ) was exported in the 2018–2019 season".

In 2024, 231,000 acres of oranges were harvested in Florida with a total value of $240.6 million with production going to processing (729,000 tons) and the rest to fresh markets (79,000 tons).

=== Mangoes ===
Florida is the largest mango producer in the United States. The first commercial mango orchard in Florida was planted in 1833. In the 20th century Mango growing and breeding was a hobby of wealthy men in South Florida including Henry Ford and Thomas Edison.

=== Peach ===
Peaches have probably been grown here since the 1500s, brought by the Spanish. By the late 1700s an export trade had developed with the mid-Atlantic states, with Baltimore the first hub to distribute Florida peaches into the surrounding region. Similar to the strawberry tool above, a cut-down SNP array for genomic selection has been adapted by the University of Florida for peaches.

Peach is a growing crop due to citrus greening. Florida produces far less than the leading state, California, but has the advantage of an earlier season than any other in the country. The harvest season runs from late March to late May or early June depending on the year's weather. Due to increasing pest and disease pressure with increasing rainfall here, yield declines rapidly in the summer and profitable harvest ends for the year. This – combined with competitor states coming into season – means that late-bearing cultivars are commercially nonviable here.

=== Strawberry ===
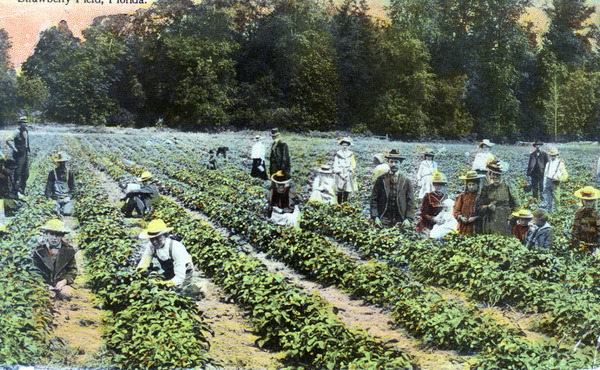
Strawberry field in Florida, before 1913

Strawberry is a major fruit crop in Florida. Florida is second only to California for strawberry production by volume and by dollars per year and the Plant City area grows 3/4 of America's winter strawberries. The Florida Strawberry Growers Association represents growers here. Strawberry gray mold is economically important. This is the Botrytis Fruit Rot of strawberries caused by Botrytis cinerea. Growers here ship strawberries December to April. The state's Strawberry Festival is held in March every year in Plant City. Anthracnose is a common disease of this crop. The University of Florida operates one of the most important strawberry demonstration breeding programs in North America. RosBREED 2 was developed partly from the experience of this program with the need to combine desirable strawberry qualities with resistance, an integral part of the RosBREED program for Rosaceae in America. They adapted Axiom's 90k SNP array to a more economical 35k for genomic selection in the program. Molecular breeding has improved greatly in the few years up to 2020 and the rapid generation cycle of strawberry also helps to speed up breeding. This program bred Phytophthora cactorum root rot resistance into their new cv. 'Florida Beauty', and for an even better example, they were able to pyramid together three disease resistance traits, to various Xanthomonas, Phytophthora, and Colletotrichum, into another cultivar. Marker-assisted parental selection (MAPS) and marker-assisted seedling selection (MASS) are now targeting Ca1 for fruit and crown rot, Cg1 for crown rot, Pc2 for root and crown rot, and Xf1 for bacterial angular leaf spot. Molecular breeding is usually suitable for monogenic traits, while polygenics are handled by genome-wide analysis. Genomics proved better than pedigree records for predicting actually results. These results lead the program to combine both genomic and locus-specific testing for their routine breeding. Leaf Spot of Strawberry (Mycosphaerella fragariae/Ramularia tulasnei, Ramularia or Ramularia Leaf Spot) is common here.

cv. 'Camino Real' is unusually vulnerable to Botrytis Fruit Rot in the conditions around the University of Florida's Gulf Coast Research and Education Center in Dover. Chandler et al., 2006 finds 'CR' is the worst among several common varieties, although 'Sweet Charlie' can be close. It is possible that the Botrytis problem in 'CR' could be remedied with different fungicide timing.

cv. ' Sweet Charlie ' was developed at the University of Florida. Chandler et al., 2006 finds 'SC' is consistently somewhat susceptible to Botrytis Fruit Rot,

The varieties 'Florida Radiance', 'Strawberry Festival' (not to be confused with the Florida Strawberry Festival), and 'Florida Beauty' are among the most commonly grown here. 'FR' is higher yielding in real producer conditions in the state than 'SF'.

Although disease resistance is an economically important trait in this crop, there is insufficient study of growers' willingness to pay. What little information is available suggests that it is low. Unsurprisingly there is even less interest in resistance on the consumer side, due to lack of understanding.

In 2024, Florida harvested 16,200 acres of strawberries, producing 3.32 million hundredweight (cwt) at a yield of 205 cwt/acre. The average price being $165 per cwt, strawberries generated around $540 million rising up to being the highest-value fruit crop in Florida.

=== Tomatoes ===
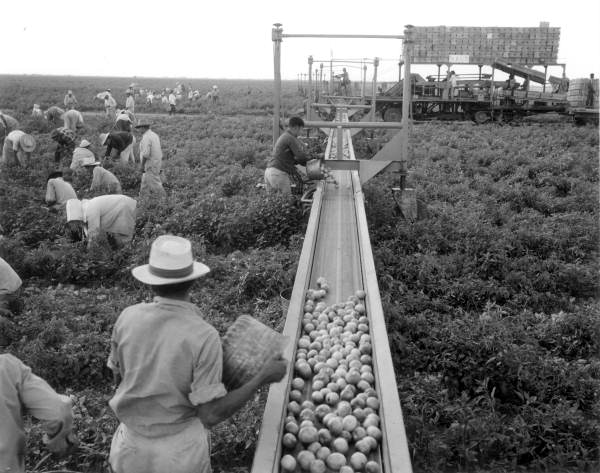
Tomato picking in Princeton, Florida in 1957

The state is No. 1 in fresh-market tomatoes. Harvest is almost year-round, from October to June. The highest temperatures of the summer from July to September end profitable yield and even the heat of June and October limit productivity, such that April to May and November to January are the largest harvests of the year.

Florida planted 24,000 acres of tomatoes in 2024 and harvested 23,200 acres yielding 6.38 million cwt. The average price being $52.40 per cwt leading to total production value amounting $331 million.

=== Sugarcane ===
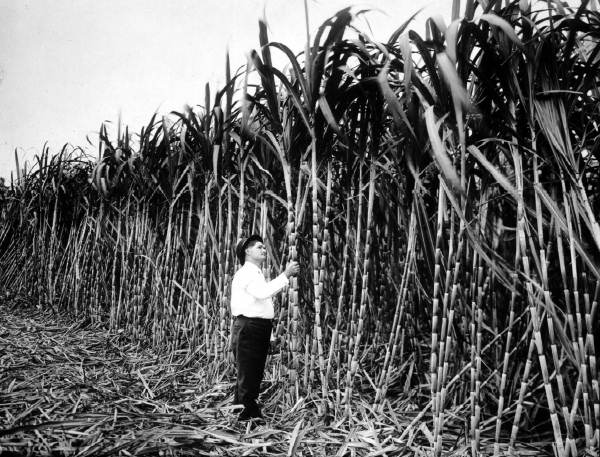
Sugarcane growing near Tampa, Florida ca. 1920

The state is the country's largest producer of sugarcane, which is primarily processed into sugar.

The sugarcane industry in Florida began in the 1760s during the British colonial period. Florida's sugarcane production expanded significantly after the United States ceased importing sugar from Cuba in 1960.

Most of the sugarcane is produced in organic soils along the southern and southeastern shore of Lake Okeechobee in Southern Florida, where the growing season is long and winters are generally warm.

== Other crops ==
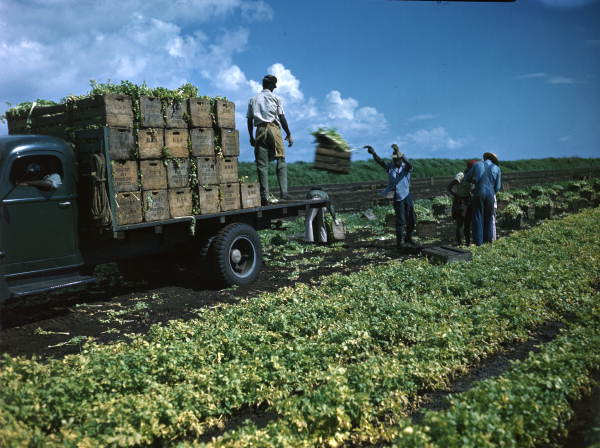
Burquest and Stockbridge Company employees loading celery crates onto trucks near Sarasota, Florida in 1945

The largest farm category by sales in Florida is the $2.3 billion ornamental industry, which includes nursery, greenhouse, flower, and sod products.

Other products include tomatoes and celery. The state is the largest producer of sweet corn and green beans for the U.S.

The state has a near monopoly on saw palmetto berries, an alternative medicine said to treat prostate and urinary disorders.

=== Okra ===
Much of the okra in the United States is grown here, especially around Dade County. Okra is grown throughout the state to some degree however and so okra is available ten months of the year here. Yields range from less than 18,000 pounds per acre (20,000 kg/ha) to over 30,000 pounds per acre (34,000 kg/ha). Wholesale prices can go as high as $18/bushel which is $0.60 per pound ($1.3/kg). The Regional IPM Centers provide integrated pest management plans specifically for the southern part of the state.

=== Persimmon ===
California and Florida account for most commercial persimmon production in the United States. The first commercial orchards in Florida were planted in the 1870s and production peaked in the 1990s before declining. Most persimmon orchards in the US are small scale (70% less than 1 acre or 0.5 hectares and 90% less than 5 acres or 2 hectares).

=== Wine grapes ===
Florida wine refers to wine made from grapes and other fruit grown in the U.S. state of Florida. Wine grapes were grown in Florida earlier than anywhere else in North America.

== Livestock ==
=== Cattle ===
==== Historical ====
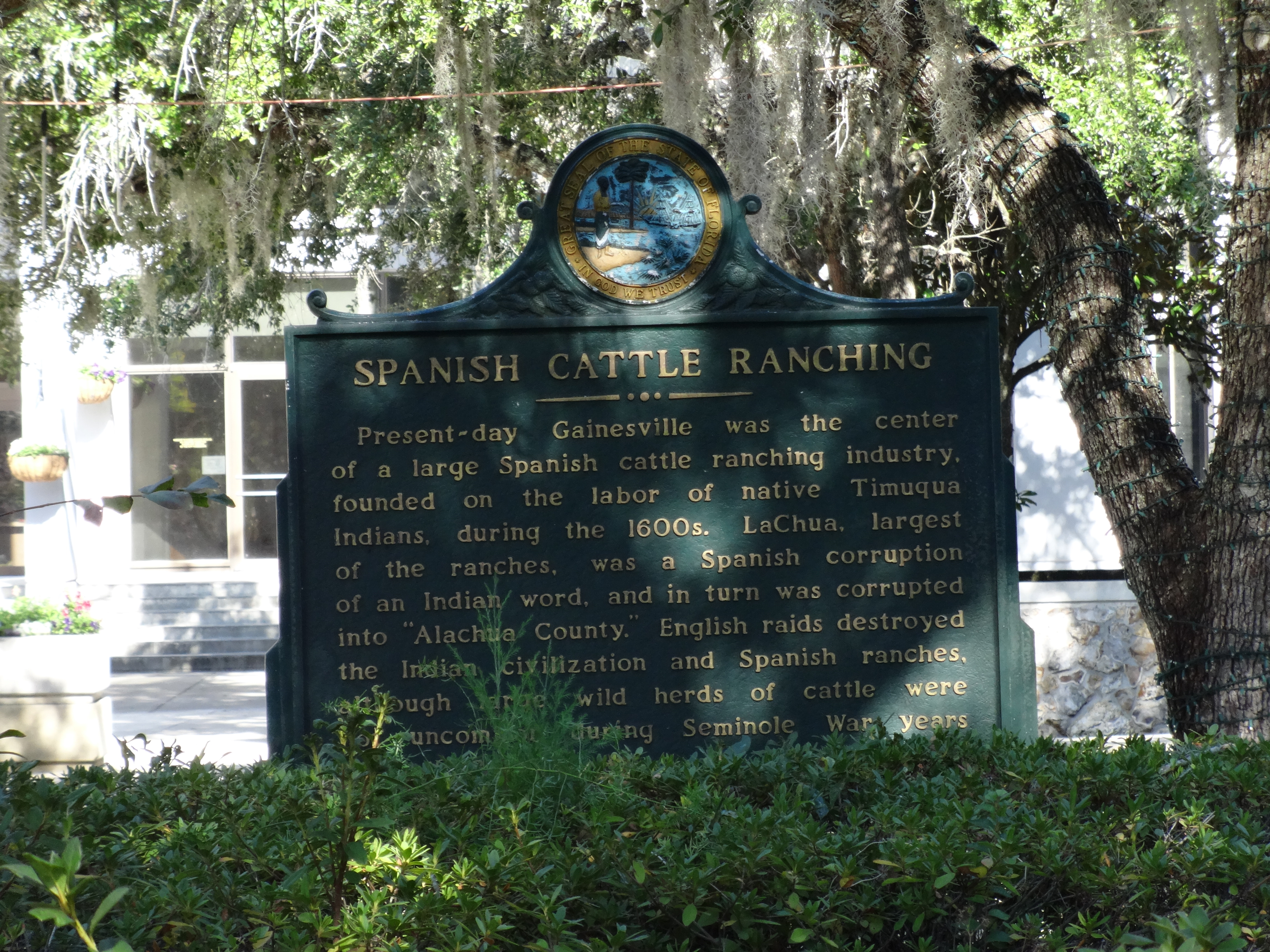
Historical marker commemorating cattle ranching in Spanish Florida

Cattle ranching was an important industry in Spanish Florida in the second half of the seventeenth century. The Spanish were in Florida for almost a century before ranching became widespread in the colony. Late in the seventeenth century, ranches were located along the middle St. Johns River, in Potano Province (present-day North Central Florida), and in Apalachee Province (the easternmost part of the Florida Panhandle known today as the Big Bend region). Ranches flourished despite conflicts with the native people of Florida. Attacks by the English colony, the Province of Carolina, and its native allies brought an abrupt end to ranching in Florida at the beginning of the eighteenth century.

=== Aquaculture ===
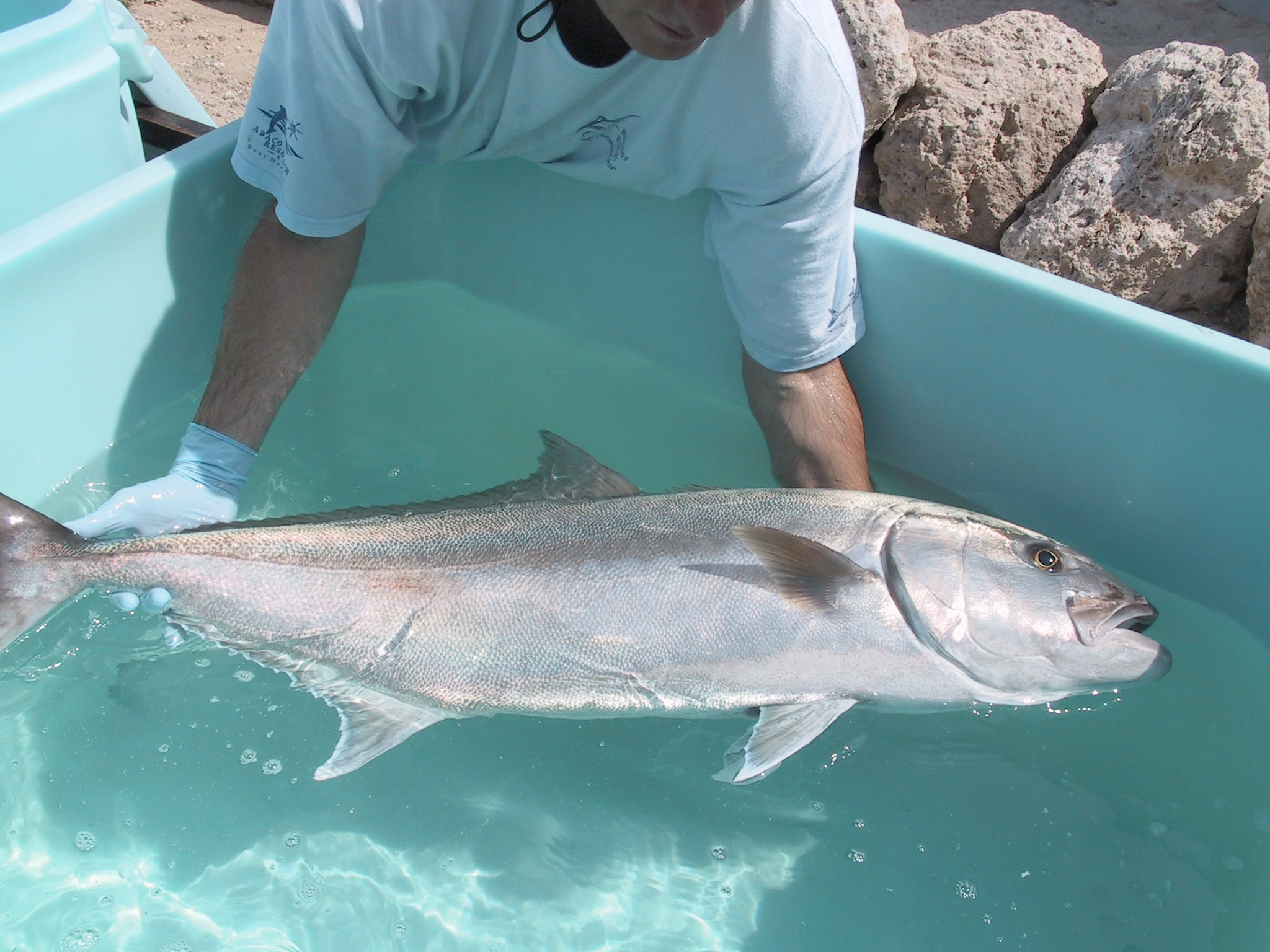
Greater amberjack broodstock at a University of Miami aquaculture research laboratory

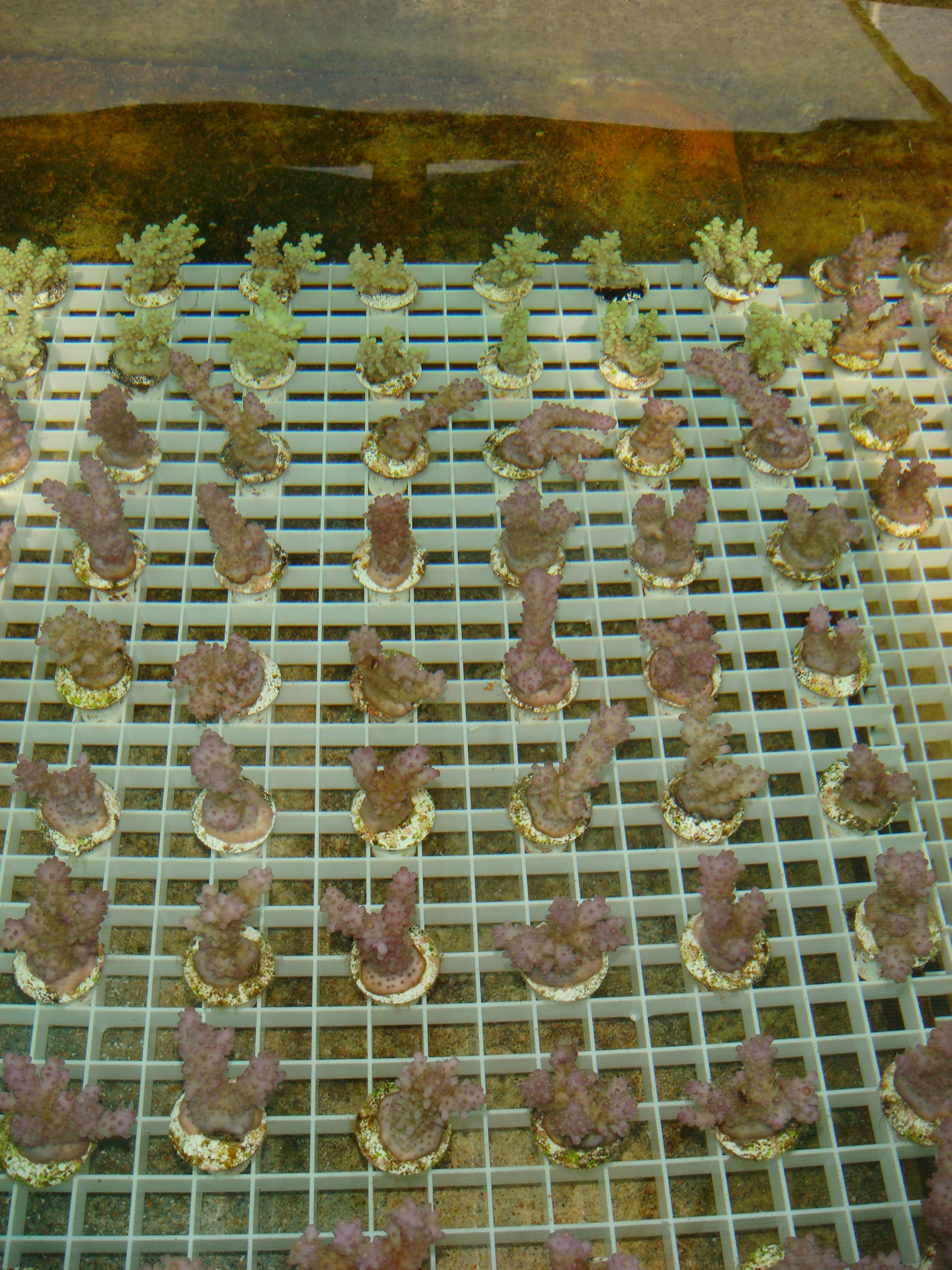
Coral aquaculture in Florida

The earliest known aquaculture in Florida was practiced by the Calusa kingdom. In the late 20th century, the wild fishery of whiteleg shrimp was overtaken by the development of aquaculture production; this began in 1973 in Florida using shrimp captured in Panama, that were used in hatcheries for larvae production.

Florida's clam aquaculture industry is centered on Cedar Key with 90% of production taking place there. The industry is negatively impacted by storms and hurricanes.

Oysters are raised on oyster farms in Florida's coastal waters including the Indian River Lagoon.

Freshwater aquaculture operations for commercial finfish production have been in operation since the 1980s. These produce products like catfish, American eel, tilapia, and hybrid striped bass. Crayfish operations have been tried, but generally without success. In 2020 the Norwegian Atlantic Sapphire began producing Atlantic salmon at a recirculating aquaculture system facility in Homestead, Florida. The facility suffered a mass mortality event in 2021.

In 2020, the Florida aquaculture industry had over 1,000 certified farms producing over 1,500 aquatic species. Additionally, Florida ranked 9th nationally in 2018 for total aquaculture value among all other US states. In fact, the total reported sales in 2018 was $72 million, according to a survey administered by the Florida Agricultural Statistics Service. In terms of ornamental aquaculture, Florida leads the US in ornamental fish production contributing 45% of the national market. Furthermore, in 2018, Florida's total ornamental fish sales amounted $28.7 million accumulated from 109 operations. For instance, $19.3 million for freshwater ornamental fish, $6.8 million for saltwater ornamental fish, and $793k for Koi. Also, Florida ranked first in 2018 for Koi fish sales in the nation.

In 2024 the aquaculture industry in Florida had gross sales of $165 million. The largest sector of Florida'a aquaculture industry by production value is ornamental fish. The ornamental fish industry in Florida peaked in 1999, at that time production in Hillsborough County alone amounted to $50 million. The industry declined due to competition from lower cost tropical producers, bottoming out in the 2000s. The internet and e-commerce offered new opportunities for direct-to-consumer sales of ornamental fish which helped smaller high end producers. In 2023 Florida produced $57 million of ornamental fish, 95% of the total production in the United States.

== Environmental concerns ==
The Everglades Agricultural Area is a major center for agriculture. The environmental impact of agriculture, especially water pollution, is a major issue in Florida today. Lake Okeechobee has been especially impacted with efforts made to reduce phosphorus runoff from farms in its wartershed. Lake Okeechobee is also negatively impacted by urban and industrial wastewater. Agriculture and urban wastewater are the major contributors to high levels of nitrogen in Tampa Bay.

== Labor ==
Much of the agricultural labor from Florida's early colonial period through the American Civil War was done by slaves.

The Florida tomato industry has historically relied on migrant labor. Exploitation of that labor was widespread with the town of Immokalee, Florida being "known as ground zero for modern day slavery."

Most present day farmworkers in the United States are foreign-born individuals and a large share are unauthorized workers or temporary guest workers under the H-2A visa program.

In a 2016-2017 Florida Citrus Harvesters Survey (FCHS), a total of 307 citrus harvesters were interviewed across South Florida counties that produce 68% of Florida's citrus. Of these, 84% were H-2A guest workers, 16% were unauthorized immigrants and 3% were US citizens and permanent residents. The surveyors decided to drop legal permanent resident and citizen groups from the analysis as after removing missing responses from dataset, there were negligible amount of responses from this group. This study estimates worker's hourly wages using advanced mathematical principles identifying $12.00/hour for H-2A workers while $9.18/hour for unauthorized workers.

Despite earning less, unauthorized workers were older at an average age of 41 years vs. 31 years among H-2A workers. Additionally, unauthorized workers had 25 years of farm experience over 18 years among H-2A workers. H-2A workers had more formal education at 8 years vs. 6.3 years for the counterpart.

Moreover, 77% of H-2A workers speak no English compared to 56% of unauthorized workers. In addition, H-2A workers are also housed in employer-provided camps which are inaccessible to public without consent.

H-2A workers are offered the Adverse Effect Wage Rate (AEWR) and employer-paid housing and transportation under law. H-2A workers' housing is inaccessible without employer consent and unauthorized workers are less likely to report abuse due to deportation risks.

== Risks ==
=== Climate change ===
Climate change in Florida poses significant risks to the state's agricultural systems. Agriculture in Florida has historically had to adapt to natural climate variations, but modern climate change is occurring at a faster and greater rate. Rising temperatures are already linked to lower crop yields and higher atmospheric CO2 can reduce the nutritional value of many crops despite stimulating growth. Intensified extreme weather events and sea level rise also pose a threat to Florida agriculture, having the potential to impact irrigation water and increase pressure from pests and disease.

Strategies for dealing with climate change challenges include, developing more efficient technologies for irrigation and nutrient use, breeding crops and livestock that are resistant to heat and disease, and further research to better understand the impact of climate change on Florida agriculture and close any current knowledge gaps.

=== Extreme weather ===
Florida's agriculture faces extreme weather conditions like hurricanes and tropical storms. The state's proximity to the Gulf of Mexico on the west coast and Atlantic Ocean on the east coast makes it especially vulnerable during the annual hurricane season.

One of the most devastating recent examples is Hurricane Ian, which struck Florida in September 2022 as a Category 4 hurricane with sustained windspeeds of almost 240 km per hour. Hurricane Ian reduced citrus production thereafter by 41%. Cortney Cameron's research highlights damage to crop production being worth an estimated $118 million and notes that the overall 60% reduction in citrus production between 2021-2022 and 2022-2023 including both hurricane and non-hurricane causes was the most significant production decline in over 100 years.

Hurricanes cause damage to citrus production as old trees are uprooted and lose limbs due to high windspeeds. Additionally, heavy rain brought by the stormy atmosphere causes excessive ground saturation and trees to fall over with a loss in grip. In terms of quantitative metrics, post-Hurricane Ian saw a 74% droppage in non-Valencia orange production compared to a 38% decline pre-Hurricane Ian. Additionally, 55% reduction post-Hurricane Ian in Valencia oranges compared to 33% droppage pre-Hurricane Ian. All in all, hurricanes cause economic damage along with environmental damage by spread of canker disease by harsh winds.

=== Pests and diseases ===
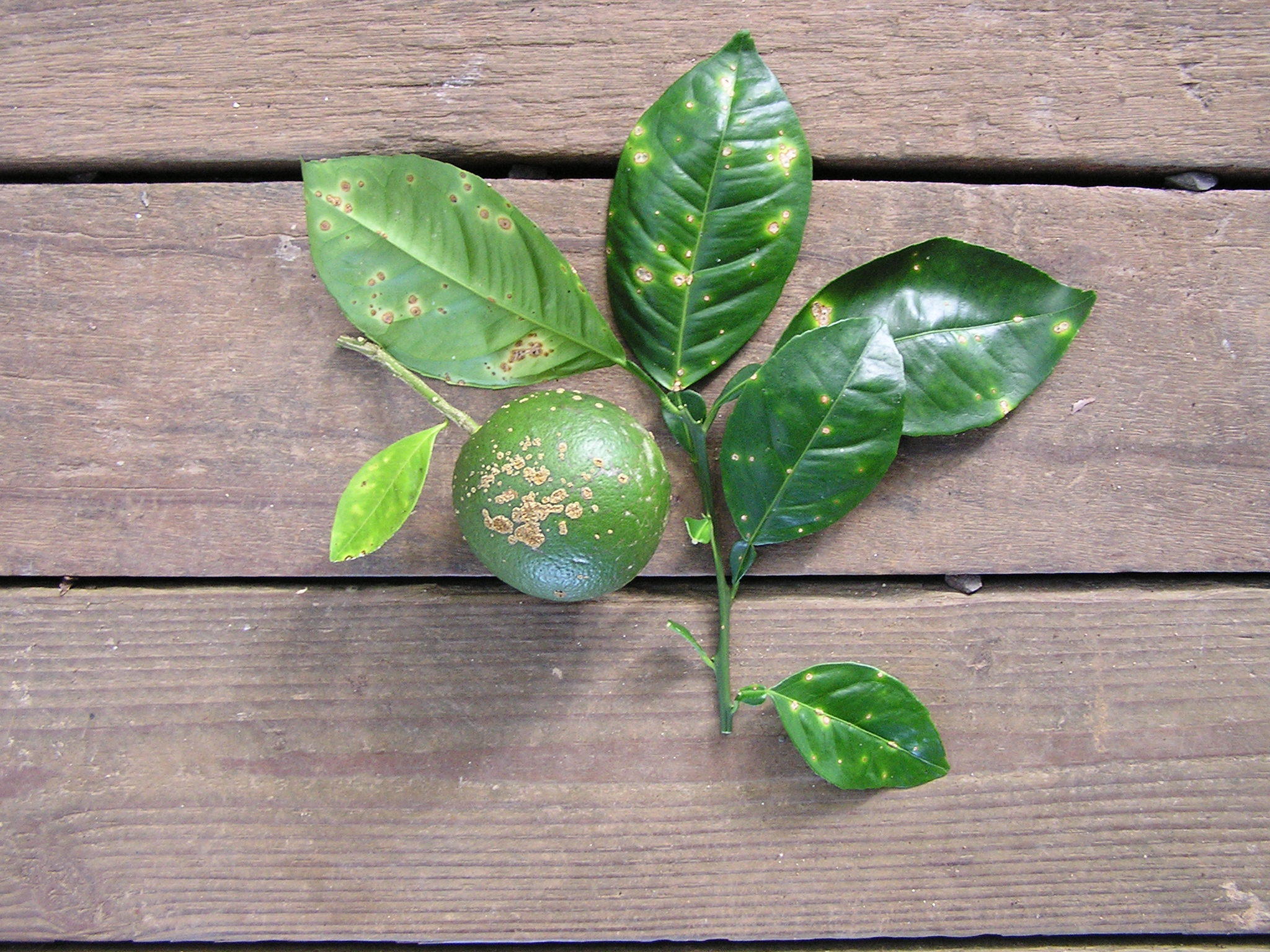
Plant infested with citrus canker

Citrus canker (Xanthomonas axonopodis) continues to be an issue of concern. From 1997 to 2013, the growing of citrus trees has declined 25%, from 600,000 to 450,000 acres (240,000 to 180,000 ha). Citrus greening, also called Huanglongbing (HLB) is an incurable bacterial infection spread by the invasive citrus psyllid (Diaphorina citri Kuwayama). It caused the loss of $4.5 billion between 2006 and 2012. Results of the annual Commercial Citrus Inventory showed that citrus acreage in 2019 was down 4% than 2018 and was the lowest in a series that began in 1966. There was a net loss of 16,411 acres during the 2018–2019 season and was twice what was lost in the previous season. Of a survey conducted of 25 published counties, 24 of them, or 96% recorded decrease in acreage. Only Sarasota County showed an increase in acreage during the 2018–2019 season. Other major citrus concerns include citrus root weevil (Diaprepes abbreviatus) and the citrus leafminer (Phyllocnistis citrella).

Tomato, bell pepper, and strawberry were the largest users of methyl bromide and so the phase out has required hard choices for alternative soil fumigants. A methyl iodide/chloropicrin mix has served well, producing equal performance to MB in pepper.

The Spotted Wing Drosophila (Drosophila suzukii) is a threat to blueberry, peach, cherry, strawberry, raspberry, and blackberry here. D. suzukii was introduced to much of North America from its initial introduction to California, including to Florida.

Strawberry anthracnose is commonly caused by Colletotrichum acutatum here. Adaskaveg & Hartin 1997 identify the most common strains on strawberry here.

The Fall Armyworm (Spodoptera frugiperda) is a major pest here. South Florida is one of only two overwintering areas for FAW in North America (the other being South Texas). Thus the entire state – and the south especially – is hard hit every year. Bt crops have been successful against FAW but some Bt resistance is appearing here which is a tremendous threat to productivity. Huang et al., 2014 find a high degree of Cry1F resistance (Cry1F-r) in the south of the state, probably the result of resistant FAW migration from Puerto Rico. This Cry1F-resistant population has low cross-resistance with Cry1A.105 but none with Cry2Ab2 or Vip3A. Overall, several studies find Cry1F-r is common here. Banerjee et al., 2017 does not find the Cry1F-r allele SfABCC2mut in Florida in 2012, 2014, or 2016. Because this allele is very common in Puerto Rico, they fail to support any substantial immigration of FAW from PR to Florida, contrary to earlier studies including Huang above.

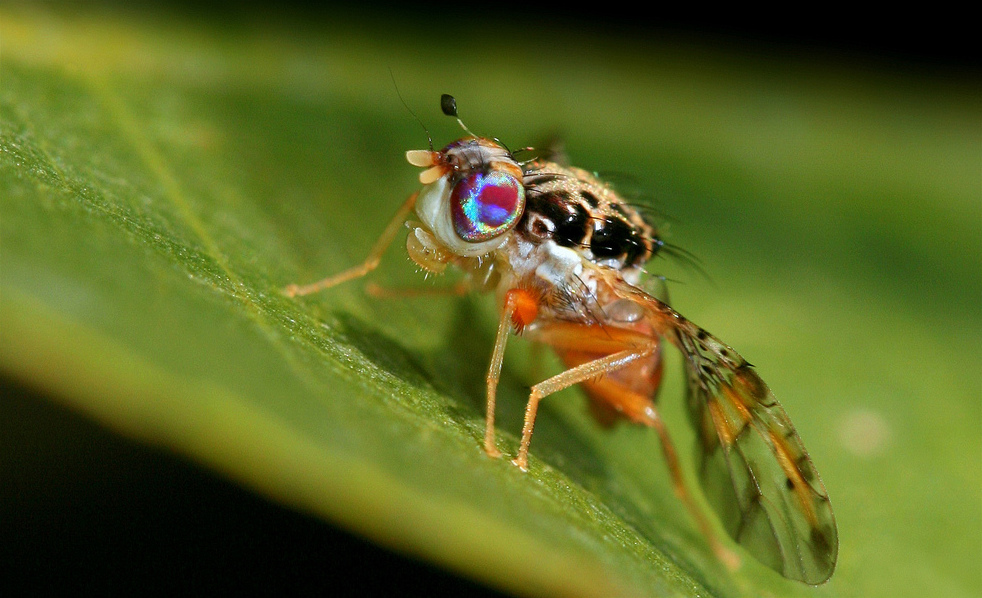
Ceratitis capitata, male

The Medfly (Ceratitis capitata) was introduced here and to California and Texas. Due to its wide host range it was immediately an important priority for the states and for USDA APHIS. Using sterile insect technique it was successfully eradicated from North America entirely.

Tomato Bacterial Spot is caused by Xanthomonas axonopodis pv. vesicatoria. Tomato Bacterial Speck is produced by Pseudomonas syringae pv. tomato. Both are economically significant in fresh-market tomato here.

The Silverleaf Whitefly (SLW, Bemisia tabaci strain B) was first noticed here in 1986. Previously only the A strain had been known here, and was only occasionally a crop pest. Suddenly in 1986 SLW was a major crop pest and major vector of crop diseases. Since then Strain A has disappeared from the United States entirely and Strain B has continued to be a widespread problem here.

The Saltmarsh Caterpillar (Estigmene acrea) is a common pest of fruit and vegetable cultivation in Florida.

After arrival in the 1930s in Alabama, the Red Imported Fire Ant (RIFA, Solenopsis invicta) quickly spread to Florida. It is a significant agricultural drag due to its soil disruption, its mound building interfering with field machines, feeding on the plants themselves, and attacks on livestock.

==== Gray Mold ====
Gray Mold is caused by Botrytis cinerea. Botrytis Fruit Rot due to this fungus is one of the most important strawberry diseases – and post-harvest diseases – here, as it is everywhere. (See also § Strawberry.) Occasionally yield losses can be over 50% in the state. Conditions favorable to the disease occur here from November to March, and its most severe destruction is in February and March. When making fungicide decisions about timing and ingredients, the UFl Institute of Food and Agricultural Sciences recommends the Strawberry Advisory System for a decision support system. Prophylactic fungicide dips don't work for this pathogen and so many in-season sprays are the only option. UFL IFAS recommends thiram, captan, captan + fexhexamid, penthiopyrad, isofetamid, fluxapyroxad + pyraclostrobin, fluopyram + pyrimethanil, pydiflumetofen + fludioxonil, and cyprodinil + fludioxonil. There is a massive problem with multiple fungicide resistance in this disease here, with most B. c. isolates showing two to six resistances and three being most common, with only fludioxonil providing any protection in many populations. Multiresistant B. c. caused a disastrous crop loss event across the state in 2012. Resistance management is thus extremely important and monotonous fungicide use is not an option. Resistance management is mostly incorporated into the Strawberry Advisory System already. Methyl bromide was an important part of production and its ban has greatly increased costs, both for soil fumigation with alternatives, and because further applications must be made during the season and post-harvest to make up for inadequate efficacy of these alternatives.

== Irrigation ==
Irrigation plays a vital role in sustaining Florida's agricultural productivity, particularly for water-intensive crops such as sugarcane, citrus, and fresh market vegetables. As of 2022, approximately 1.7 million acres of cropland in Florida were irrigated, drawing around 1,811 million gallons of water per day (MGD) on average. In a 1-in-10 dry year, this demand can surge to 2,439 MGD.

The top irrigated crops in 2022 were sugarcane consuming 657 MGD, citrus at 315 MGD and fresh market vegetables at 277 MGD. These three crops made up 69% of all irrigated acreage.

As for projected trends through 2050, statewide irrigated area is projected to decrease by 56,083 acres. Hence, a net reduction of 59 MGD irrigation volume on average annually. Additionally, Florida farmers are projected to improve irrigation efficiency by 113 MGD statewide by 2050 which is around 6% of total agricultural irrigation demand.

Irrigation is also used during winter months for freeze protection for crops like citrus, blueberries, strawberries, and ferns. In 2022, around 62 MGD was used for frost protection on an average annual daily flow (AADF) basis. By 2050, freeze irrigation demand is projected to decrease to about 58 MGD due to declining irrigated acreage.

Irrigation water is also used for livestock and aquaculture. In 2022, an estimate 32.1 MGD was used for livestock and 20.3 MGD for aquaculture.

== Production ==
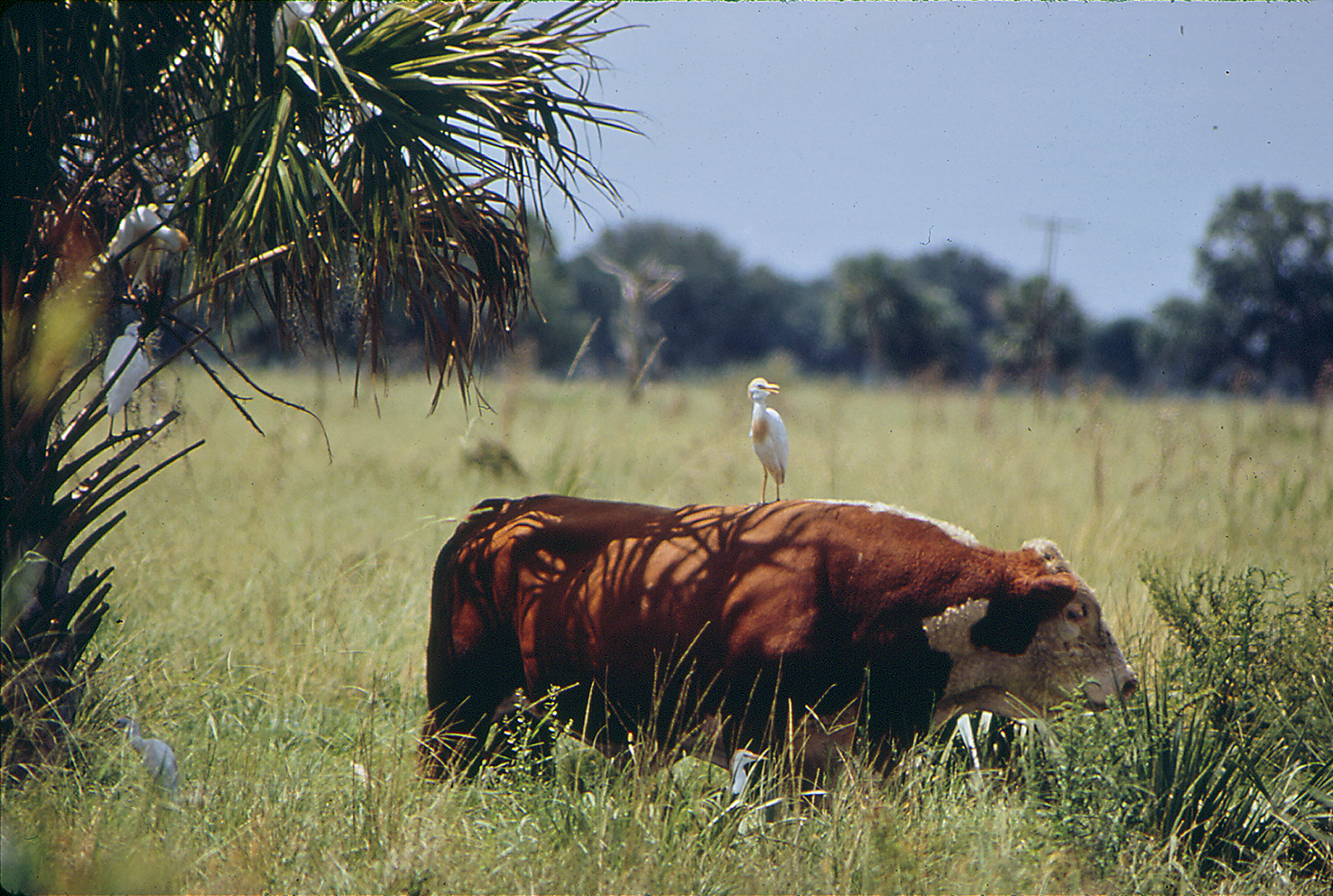
Cow on a ranch in Florida with a Cattle egret on its back

In 2002 peppers and tomatoes were #1 and #2 in dollar value for the state and citrus fruit, especially oranges, were also a major part of the economy. By 2019 tomatoes were #1, oranges #2, and peppers were #3. Of exports, meat is Florida's biggest earner.

Florida was ranked in 2019, "first in the value of production for fresh market bell peppers and tomatoes, as well as grapefruit, oranges, sugarcane, and watermelons" in the United States according to Florida Agriculture by the Numbers.

== See also ==
- Florida Cracker cattle
- Florida Cracker horse
- Deseret Ranches
- Coalition of Immokalee Workers
- Sugar Cane Growers Cooperative of Florida
- Fanjul family
- U.S. Sugar
- Restoration of the Everglades
- History of slavery in Florida
- Agriculture in Texas
- Tropicana Products
- Simply Beverages
- Great Freeze
- Florida's Natural Growers
- Florida Citrus Mutual
- Florida Citrus Tower
- Juice Train
- Draining and development of the Everglades
- Agriculture in Louisiana
