= I129 =

I129 or I-129 may refer to:

- Interstate 129, an auxiliary Interstate Highway which connects South Sioux City, Nebraska to Interstate 29 in Sioux City, Iowa
- Iodine-129 (I-129 or ^{129}I), a radioactive isotope of iodine
- Form I-129 (Petition for a Nonimmigrant Worker) filed by employers for workers seeking a temporary nonimmigrant worker classification such as the H-1B visa, H-2A visa, H-2B visa, or L-1 visa
