= Economy of Florida =

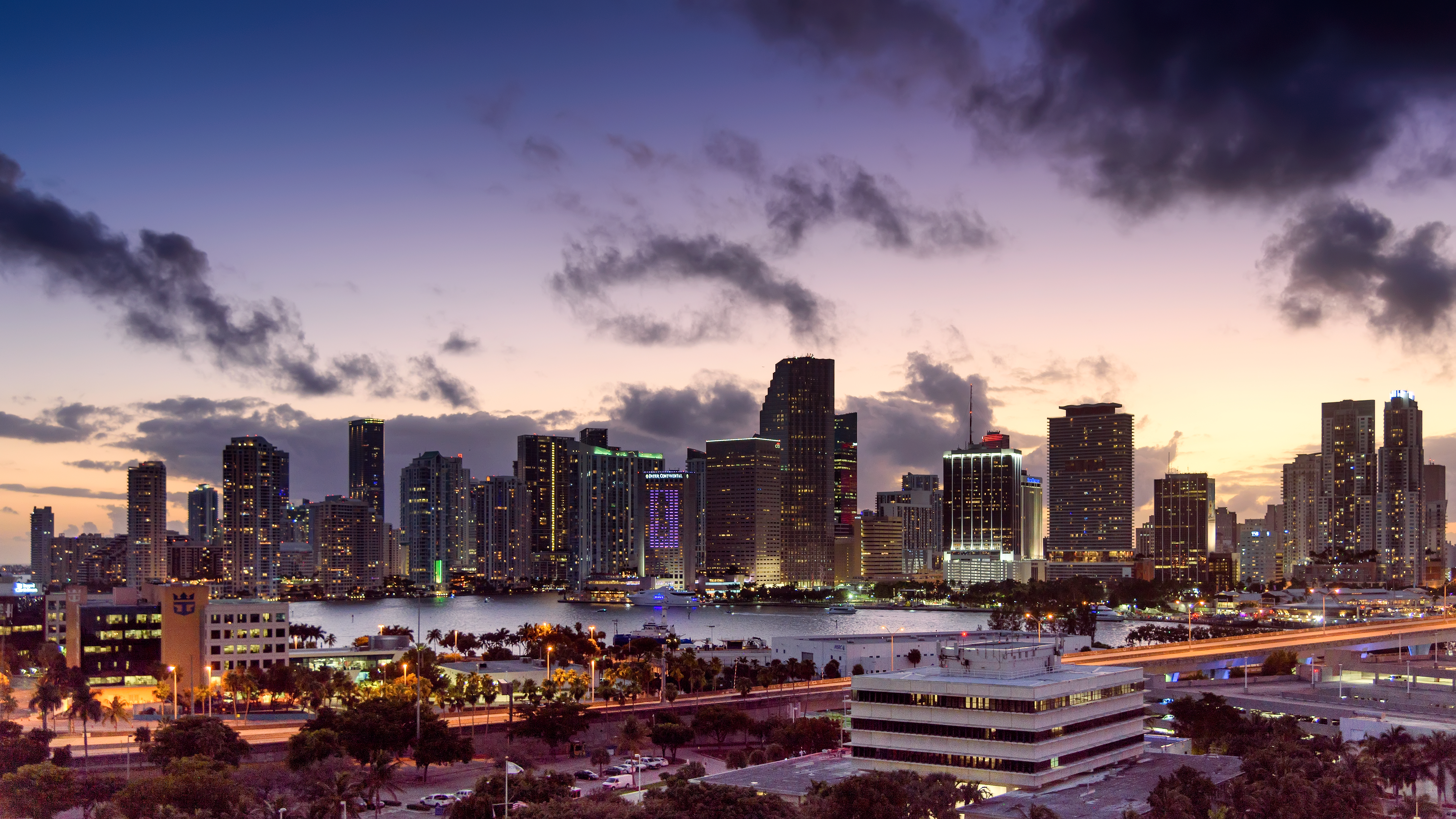
- Miami, the economic center of Florida

Statistics
- GDP: $1.805 trillion (2025)
- GDP per capita: $76,958 (2025)
- Gini coefficient: 0.4829 ± 0.0028 (2023)
- Unemployment: 4.5% (Aug. 2026)

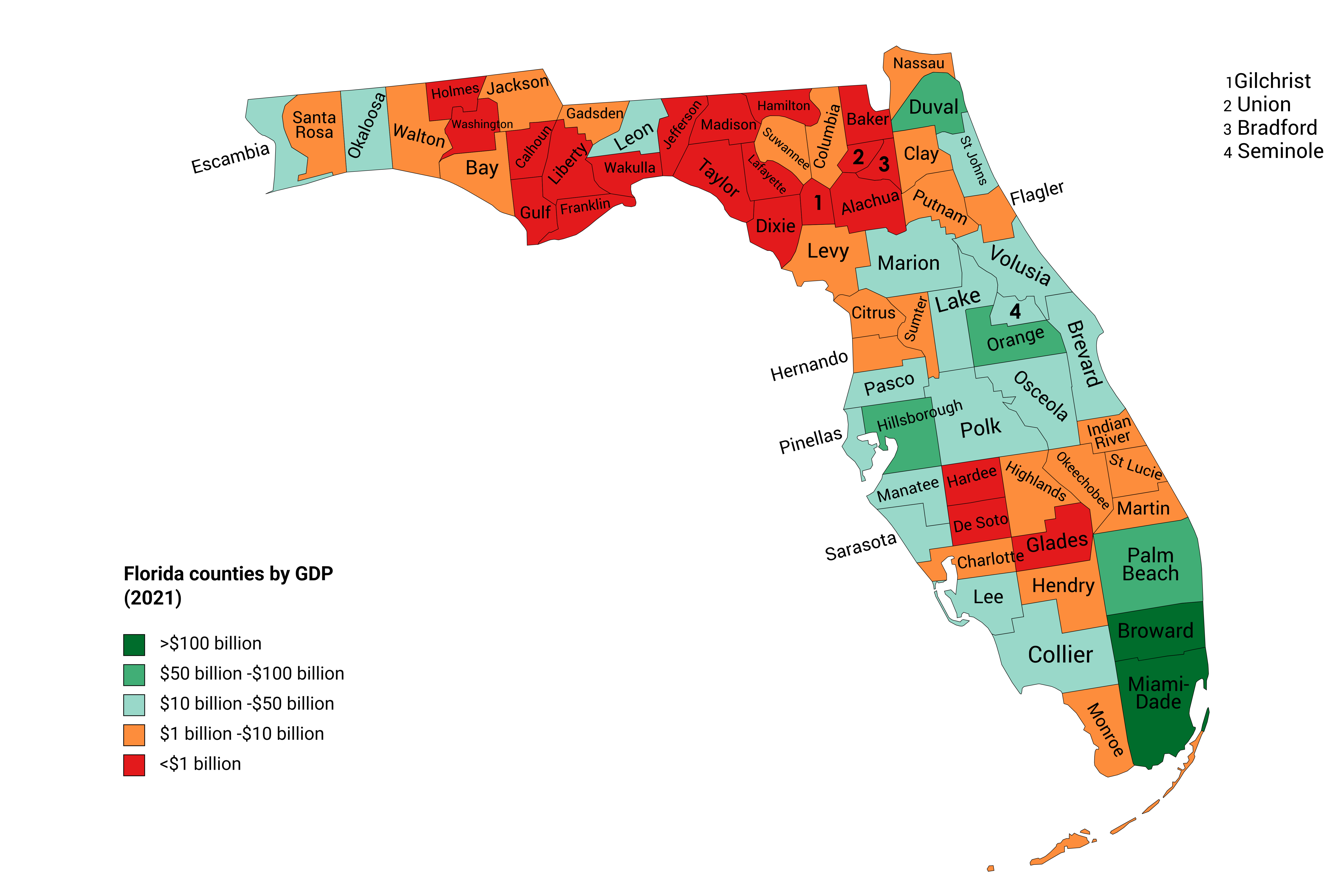
Counties in Florida by GDP in 2021 (chained 2012 US$)

The economy of the state of Florida is the fourth-largest in the United States, with a $1.805 trillion gross state product (GSP) as of 2025. If Florida were a sovereign nation (2024), it would rank as the world's 15th-largest economy by nominal GDP according to the International Monetary Fund, ahead of Spain and behind South Korea. Agriculture, tourism, industry, construction, international banking, biomedical and life sciences, healthcare research, simulation training, aerospace and defense, and commercial space travel contribute to the state's economy.

== Overview ==
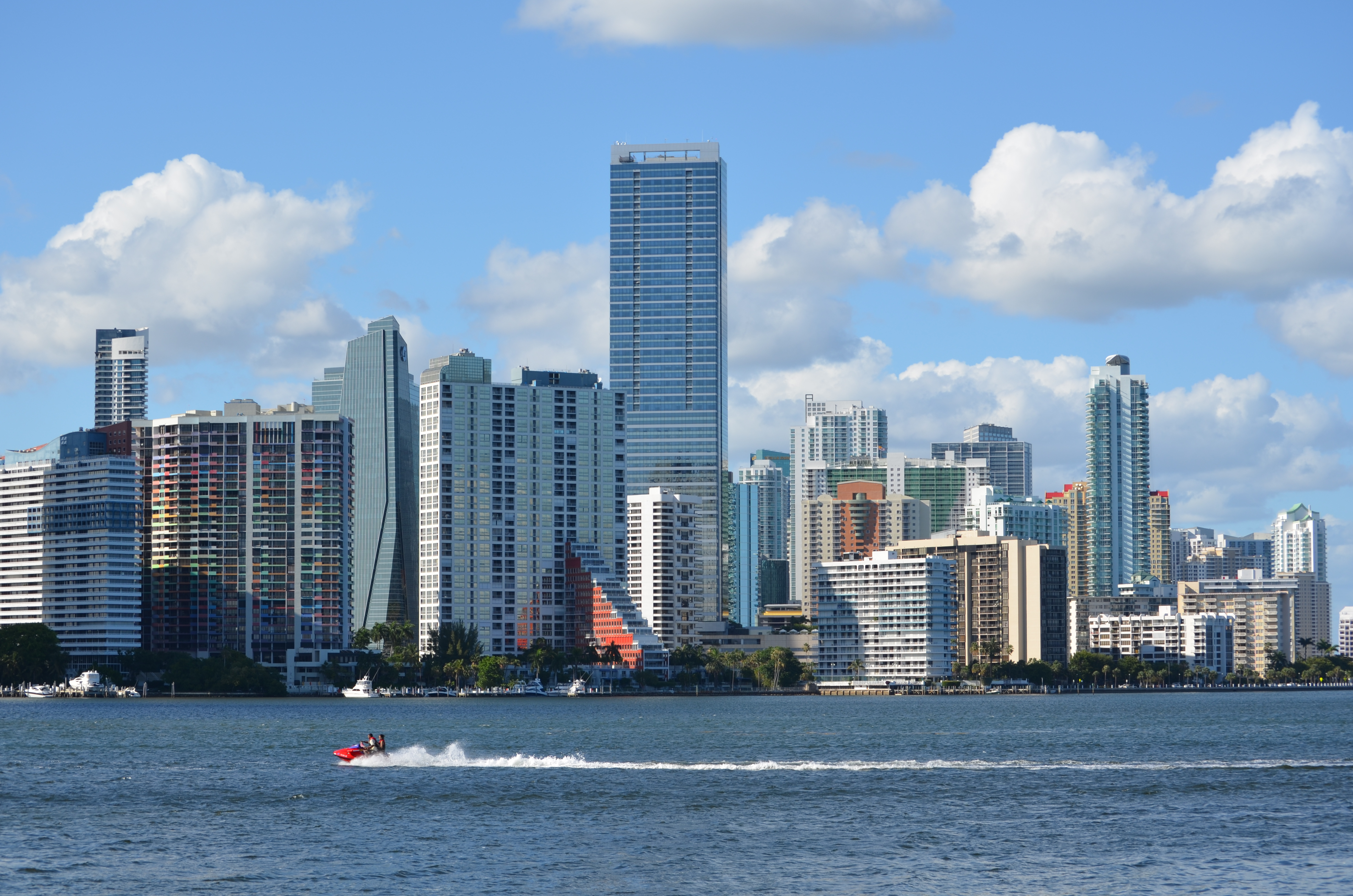
The Brickell Financial District in Miami contains the largest concentration of international banks in the United States.

Florida's economy ranks among the largest in the country. As of 2024, the gross state product (GSP) is about $1.647 trillion, the fourth largest economy in the United States. According to a June 3, 2025 forecast by Florida TaxWatch, Florida's economy reached nearly US$1.5 trillion in gross state product and is projected to continue growing through 2030, although at a gradually slower rate. Florida is responsible for 5.82% of the United States' approximately $28 trillion gross domestic product (GDP). As of 2024, Florida's nominal GDP is larger than all but 15 countries; if it were a sovereign nation, it would be ranked ahead of Spain and behind South Korea. In terms of Purchasing Power Parity, it is larger than all but 22 countries. Agriculture, tourism, industry, construction, international banking, biomedical and life sciences, healthcare research, simulation training, aerospace and defense, and commercial space travel contribute to the state's economy.

The top five industries in Florida for employment are: trade, transportation, and utilities; government; professional and business services; education and health services; and leisure and hospitality. Forecasts indicate that Florida will continue experiencing rapid population growth over the next several years, which is expected to drive long-term employment expansion in multiple industries. Data shows that job gains are likely to be strongest in healthcare, education, construction, and service-based fields (University of Florida Bureau of Economic and Business Research, 2023). In output, the five largest sectors are: finance, insurance, real estate, rental, and leasing, followed by professional and business services; government and government enterprises; educational services, health care, and social assistance; and retail trade.

In 2025, current-dollar personal consumption expenditures in Florida increased by 7.0%, the largest percentage increase among U.S. states, according to the Bureau of Economic Analysis.

In 2017, Florida became the United States' eighth largest exporter of trade goods. Florida's top countries for export are Brazil, Canada, Mexico, Germany, and Colombia. In 2017, Florida became the United States' tenth largest importer of trade goods. Florida imported US$75.4 billion worth of goods globally in 2017. The value of Florida's imports equals 3.2% of United States' overall imported products for 2017. Florida's top countries for imports are China, Mexico, Canada, Germany, and France.

The Miami Metropolitan Area has the highest GDP of all the metro areas in Florida with $344.9 billion in 2017. This is more than twice the number of the next metro area, the Tampa Bay Area, which has a GDP of $145.3 billion. The economy of Florida is driven almost entirely by its nineteen metropolitan areas. In 2004, they had a combined total of 95.7% of the state's domestic product.

Per capita GDP in 2017 was $39,842, ranking 40th in the nation. Per capita income varies widely by geographic region and profession. North Florida and the rural counties of the Florida Panhandle are the most impoverished in the state. Florida has a poverty rate of 14.0%, the seventeenth lowest of any state in the country. Many coastal cities include some of the wealthiest per-capita areas in the United States.

In 2018, there were more than 427,824 millionaires in the state, the fourth-highest number in the nation.

For 2018–19, the approved state budget is $88.7 billion, a 4.4% increase over the previous 2017–18 budget of $84.9 billion. Chief Executive Magazine named Florida the third "Best State for Business" in 2011.

In 2022, as job numbers continue to surge, Florida's unemployment rate dipped to 2.7 percent in July which hit historic low.

== Personal income ==
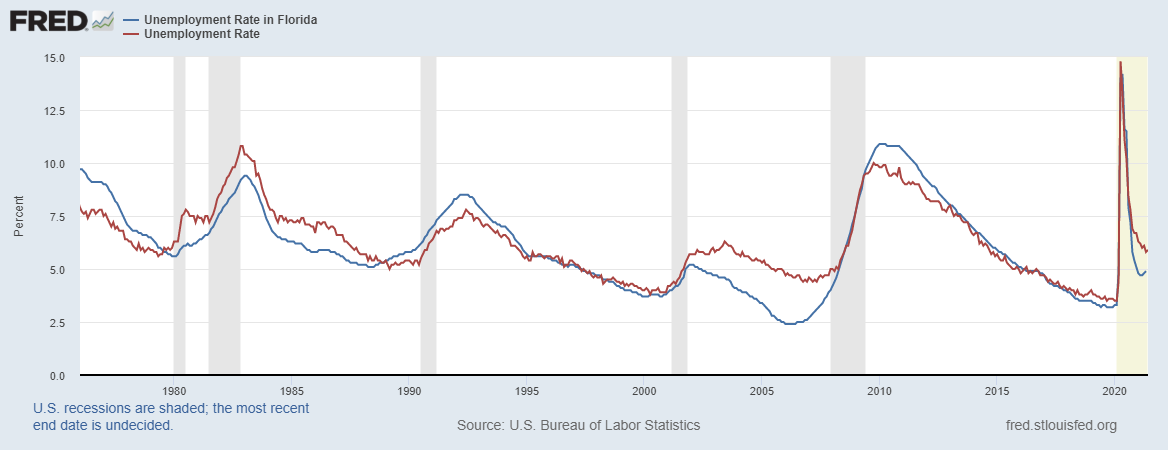
Florida unemployment rate, 1976–2021 US unemployment rate

In 2024, Florida's per capita personal income was $70,390, ranking 20th in the nation. The state's unemployment rate in April 2025 was 3.7% and ranked as the 20th lowest in the United States. Florida is one of eight states that does not impose a personal income tax.

In 2024, Florida had a personal income of $1,645,165,700,000. This personal income ranked 4th in the United States.

Florida's constitution establishes a state minimum wage, which is adjusted annually for inflation. As of September 30, 2021, Florida's minimum wage was $6.98 for tipped positions, and $10.00 for non-tipped positions, which was higher than the federal rate of $7.25. The wage will increase by $1 per hour yearly, until 2026 when the minimum wage for non-tipped positions will reach $15 per hour. After 2026 the Florida state minimum wage will be increased for inflation each year by the state Agency for Workforce Innovation based on the consumer price index for urban wage earners and clerical workers, (CPI-W).

Florida has two cities in the top 25 cities in the U.S. with the highest average credit card debt, Miami and Tampa.

The poverty rate in Florida in 2023 was 12.3%, down from a peak of 17.1% in 2012. Statewide economic analysis shows that Florida's labor force, housing market, and business formation rates remain strong, reflecting continued stability in the state's economy. Reports highlight rising job creation, steady wage growth, and increased business activity across major metropolitan areas (Florida Department of Economic Opportunity, 2024).

== Sectors ==
=== Agriculture ===
Florida was ranked in 2019, "first in the value of production for fresh market bell peppers and tomatoes, as well as grapefruit, oranges, sugarcane, and watermelons" in the United States according to Florida Agriculture by the Numbers. In 2002 peppers and tomatoes were #1 and #2 in dollar value for the state and citrus fruit, especially oranges, were also a major part of the economy. By 2019 tomatoes were #1, oranges #2, and peppers were #3. Of exports, meat is Florida's biggest earner. By 2026 Citrus Production has fell far below historical norms and now accounts for just 17% of the US Citrus Crop. Disease (Citrus Greening) along with weather patterns and land development are largely responsible for this decline.

==== Strawberry ====
Strawberry is another major crop in Florida. Florida is second only to California for strawberry production by volume and by dollars per year and the Plant City area grows 3/4 of America's winter strawberries. The Florida Strawberry Growers Association represents growers here. Strawberry gray mold is economically important. This is the Botrytis Fruit Rot of strawberries caused by Botrytis cinerea. (See § Botrytis cinerea.) Growers here ship strawberries December to April. The state's Strawberry Festival is held in March every year in Plant City.

The varieties 'Florida Radiance', 'Strawberry Festival' (not to be confused with the Florida Strawberry Festival), and 'Florida Beauty' are among the most commonly grown here. 'FR' is higher yielding in real producer conditions in the state than 'SF'.

==== Peach ====
Peaches have probably been grown in Florida since the 1500s, brought by the Spanish. By the late 1700s an export trade had developed with the mid-Atlantic states, with Baltimore the first hub to distribute Florida peaches into the surrounding region. Similar to the strawberry tool above, a cut-down SNP array for genomic selection has been adapted by University of Florida for peach.

Peach is a growing crop due to citrus greening. Florida produces far less than the leading state, California, but has the advantage of an earlier season than any other in the country. The harvest season runs from late March to late May or early June depending on the year's weather. Due to increasing pest and disease pressure with increasing rainfall here, yield declines rapidly in the summer and profitable harvest ends for the year. This – combined with competitor states coming into season – means that late-bearing cultivars are commercially inviable here.

==== Citrus ====
Although citrus cultivation also began in Florida in the 1500s, commercial scale production was only attempted in the 1920s. At first this went badly due to severe pest and disease epidemics, which were themselves due to poor understanding of the local climate and terrain. As of 2019 oranges make up 93% of Florida's citrus production, followed by 6% for grapefruit, and 1% for tangerines and tangelos. For 2018, 10.9% of all cash receipts were citruses. In 2006, 67% of all citrus, 74% of oranges, 58% of tangerines, and 54% of grapefruit were grown in Florida. About 95% of commercial orange production in the state is destined for processing (mostly as orange juice, the official state beverage). The top 5 citrus-producing counties, according to data in 2019, was "DeSoto (12.8 million boxes), Polk (12.5 million boxes), Highlands (10.8 million boxes), Hendry (10.5 million boxes) and Hardee (8.16 million boxes)", according to Florida Agriculture by the Numbers. Together they contribute 71% of Florida's total citrus production. The Central produced the most citrus, followed by the Western area and the Southern areas. International citrus fresh fruit exports totaled to "2.05 million 4/5 bushel cartons", and Japan received the majority of the grapefruit exports. Canada received most of Florida's orange and tangerine exports. Florida Agriculture by the Numbers reports "4.70 million gallons of Frozen Concentrated Orange Juice (FCOJ), and 0.38 million gallons of Frozen Concentrated Grapefruit Juice (FCGJ) was exported in the 2018–2019 season".

==== Other crops ====
The largest farm category by sales in Florida is the $2.3 billion ornamental industry, which includes nursery, greenhouse, flowers, and sod products.

Other products include sugarcane, tomatoes and celery. The state is the largest producer of sweet corn and green beans for the U.S.

The Everglades Agricultural Area is a major center for agriculture. The environmental impact of agriculture, especially water pollution, is a major issue in Florida today.

The state has a near monopoly on saw palmetto berries, an alternative medicine used to treat prostate and urinary disorders.

The state is #1 in fresh-market tomatoes. Harvest is almost year-round, from October to June. The highest temperatures of the summer from July to September end profitable yield and even the heat of June and October limit productivity, such that April to May and November to January are the largest harvests of the year. Federal Crop Insurance for fresh tomatoes specifically excludes insects and diseases. See also § Tomato Bacterial Spot, § Tomato Bacterial Speck, and § Treatments in fresh-market tomato.

Much of the okra in the country is grown here, especially around Dade. Okra is grown throughout the state to some degree however and so okra is available ten months of the year here. Yields range from less than 18,000 pounds per acre (20,000 kg/ha) to over 30,000 pounds per acre (34,000 kg/ha). Wholesale prices can go as high as $18/bushel which is $0.60 per pound ($1.3/kg). The Regional IPM Centers provide integrated pest management plans specifically for the southern part of the state.

California and Florida account for most commercial Persimmon production in the United States. The first commercial orchards in Florida were planted in the 1870s and production peaked in the 1990s before declining. Most persimmon orchards in the US are small scale (70% less than 1 acre or 0.5 hectares and 90% less than 5 acres or 2 hectares).

=== Fishing ===
In 2024, Florida's seafood industry had a total dockside value of $240.5 million, supported 2,981 jobs, generated $8.87 million in business tax revenue, and contributed over $365.2 million to the state's overall economic impact, reflecting a decrease of about 3.4% over the past decade.

=== Government and military ===
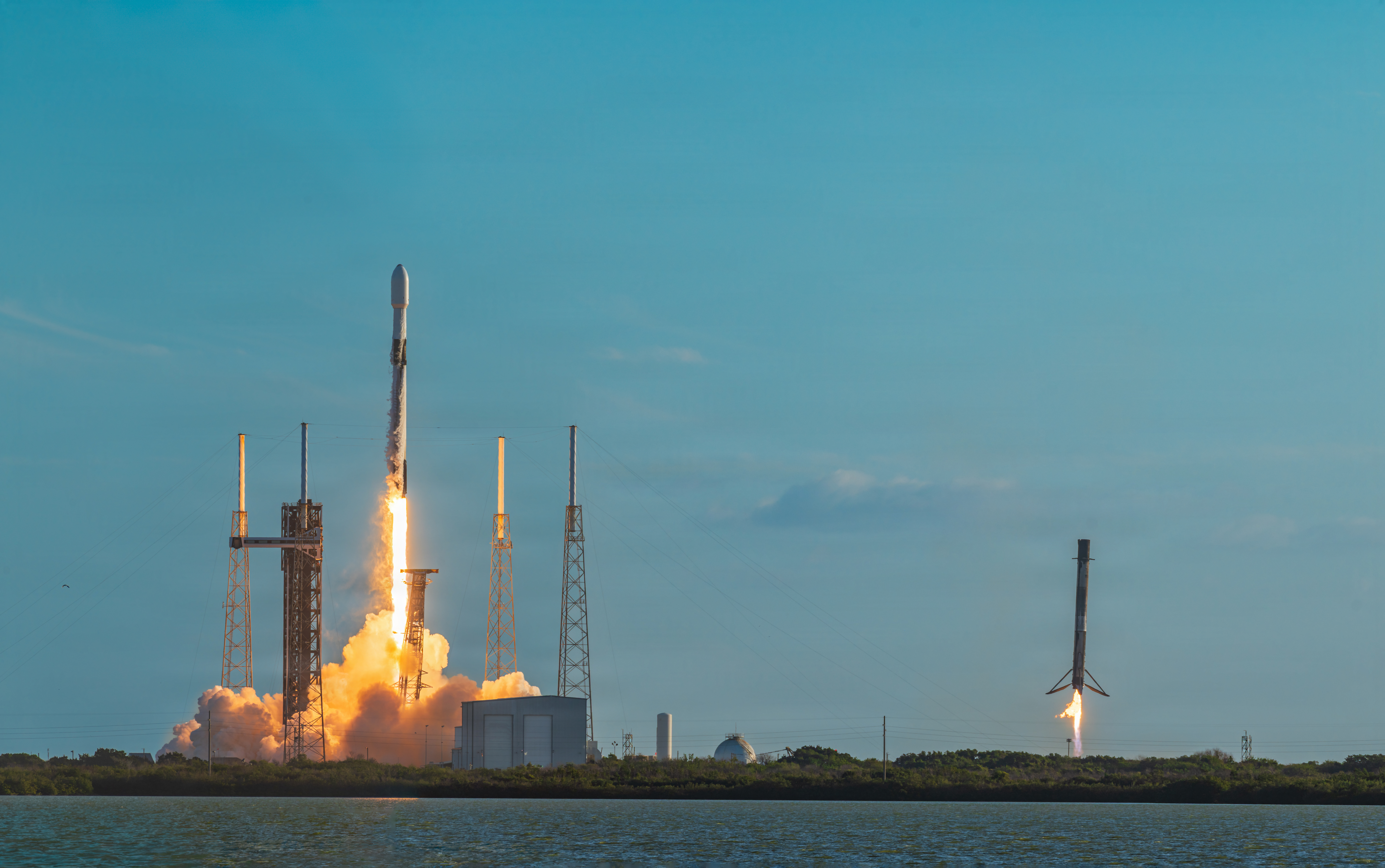
One of the Cape Canaveral launch sites during the launch and landing of Cygnus NG-24 in 2026

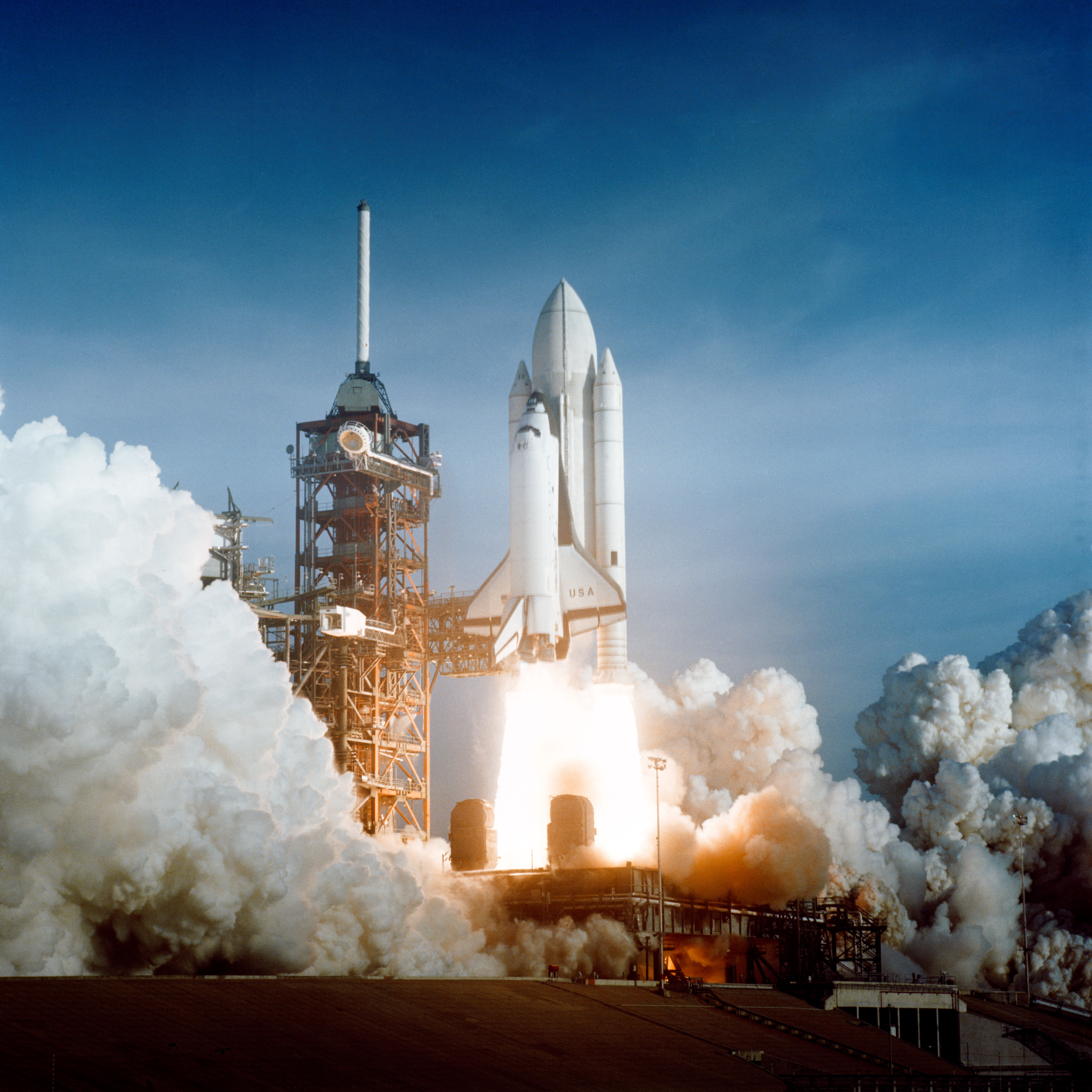
Launch of Space Shuttle Columbia from the Kennedy Space Center

Since the development of the federal NASA Merritt Island launch sites on Cape Canaveral (most notably Kennedy Space Center) in 1962, Florida has developed a sizable aerospace industry.

In 2009, there were 89,706 federal workers employed within the state. Tens of thousands more employees work for contractors who have federal contracts, including those with the military.

In 2012, government of all levels was a top employer in all counties in the state, because this classification includes public school teachers and other school staff. School boards employ nearly one of every thirty workers in the state. The federal military was the top employer in three counties.

=== Mass media ===
Broadband Internet in Florida is deployed by both government agencies and private companies. Examples of government agencies include the North Florida Broadband Authority.

=== Renewable energy ===
Florida's renewable-sourced electricity generation in 2024 accounted for approximately 10% of the state's total in-state generation, with nearly nine-tenths of that coming from solar energy. Nationally, Florida ranks third in total (net) Solar Electric Generation in MW, behind California and Texas.The State ranks #40 in Solar Electricity as a percentage of the Electric Grid.

=== Mining ===
The Bone Valley region of Florida encompassing parts of Polk, Manatee and Hillsborough counties is one of the largest known phosphate deposits in the world and makes up 60% of all phosphate production of the United States and about 25% of global phosphate production. Florida is home to 28 phosphate mines with 11 of these being active, 10 mines reclaimed, and the rest shutdown or not started.

Fuller's earth is also mined in Florida with the state being home to 10 mines.

=== Biotech ===
After the watershed events of Hurricane Andrew in 1992, Florida began investing in economic development through the Office of Trade, Tourism, and Economic Development. Governor Jeb Bush realized that watershed events such as Andrew negatively impacted Florida's backbone industry of tourism severely. The office was directed to target Medical/Bio-Sciences among others. Three years later, The Scripps Research Institute (TSRI) announced it had chosen Florida for its newest expansion. In 2003, TSRI announced plans to establish a major science center in Palm Beach County, a 364,000 square feet (33,800 m^{2}) facility on 100 acres (40 ha), which TSRI planned to occupy in 2006.

=== Real estate ===
In the early 20th century, land speculators discovered Florida, and businessmen such as Henry Plant and Henry Flagler developed railroad systems, which led people to move in, drawn by the weather and local economies. From then on, tourism boomed, fueling a cycle of development that overwhelmed a great deal of farmland.

At the end of the third quarter of 2008, Florida had the highest mortgage delinquency rate in the US, with 7.8% of mortgages delinquent at least 60 days. A 2009 list of national housing markets that were hard hit in the real estate crash included a disproportionate number in Florida. The early 21st-century building boom left Florida with 300,000 vacant homes in 2009, according to state figures. In 2009, the US Census Bureau estimated that Floridians spent an average 49.1% of personal income on housing-related costs, the third-highest percentage in the US.

In the third quarter of 2009, there were 278,189 delinquent loans, 80,327 foreclosures. Sales of existing homes in February 2010 was 11,890, up 21% from the same month in 2009. Only two metropolitan areas showed a decrease in homes sold: Panama City and Brevard County. The average sales price for an existing house was $131,000, 7% decrease from the prior year. The real estate and construction markets remain major contributors to Florida's GDP. Rapid population growth has increased demand for both residential and commercial building, helping boost construction employment and overall economic activity throughout the state (Tampa Bay Times, 2023).

The rate of home price growth in Florida has slowed significantly. As of July 2025, U.S. home prices increased by only 1.7% year over year — the slowest pace since 2023. In Florida, median home prices are leveling off, inventory is rising, and buyers are gaining more negotiating power, signaling a shift toward a more balanced housing market.

=== Economic policy overview ===
These programs aim to expand employment opportunities, strengthen regional economic competitiveness, and advance emerging industry sectors—ensuring Florida's economy remains resilient and diversified. In support of this vision, recently awarded more than $1.5 million to 26 communities—including 24 small and rural areas—to craft strategic economic‑development and resilience plans. Florida's overall economic output has continued to rise, driven by growth in key industries such as real estate, healthcare, and professional services. According to federal data, Florida's GDP showed strong year-over-year expansion, outpacing many other large states in multiple economic sectors (U.S. Bureau of Economic Analysis, 2024).

=== Seaports and boating ===
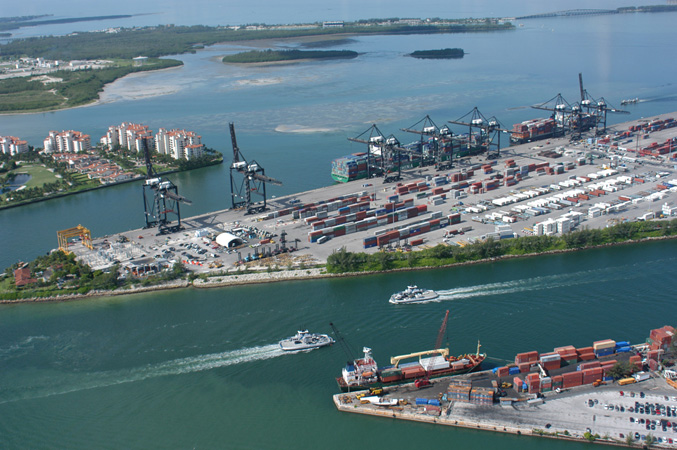
PortMiami is the largest passenger port in the world. It is known as the "Cruise Capital of the World."

Florida has many seaports that serve container ships, tank ships, and cruise lines. Major ports in Florida include Port Tampa Bay in Tampa, Port Everglades in Fort Lauderdale, Port of Jacksonville in Jacksonville, PortMiami in Miami, Port Canaveral in Brevard County, Port Manatee in Manatee County, and Port of Palm Beach in Riviera Beach. The world's top three busiest cruise ports are found in Florida with PortMiami as the busiest and Port Canaveral and Port Everglades as the second and third busiest. Port Tampa Bay meanwhile is the largest in the state, having the most tonnage. As of 2013, Port Tampa Bay ranks 16th in the United States by tonnage in domestic trade, 32nd in foreign trade, and 22nd in total trade. It is the largest, most diversified port in Florida, has an economic impact of more than $15.1 billion, and supports more than 80,000 jobs.

Florida is the leading state for sales of powerboats. Boats sales totaled $1.96 billion in 2013.

=== Tourism ===
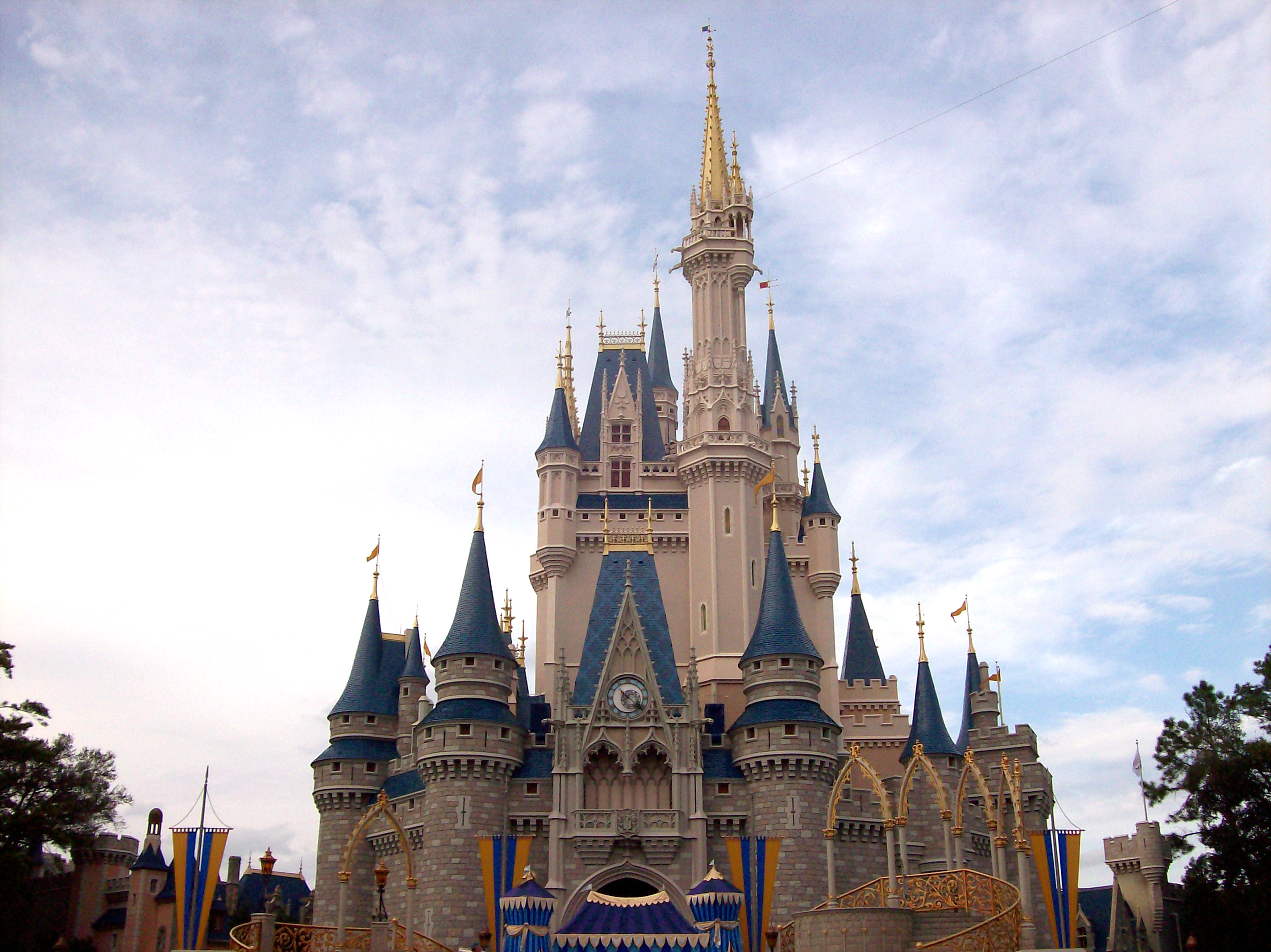
Walt Disney World Resort in Bay Lake, Florida near Orlando

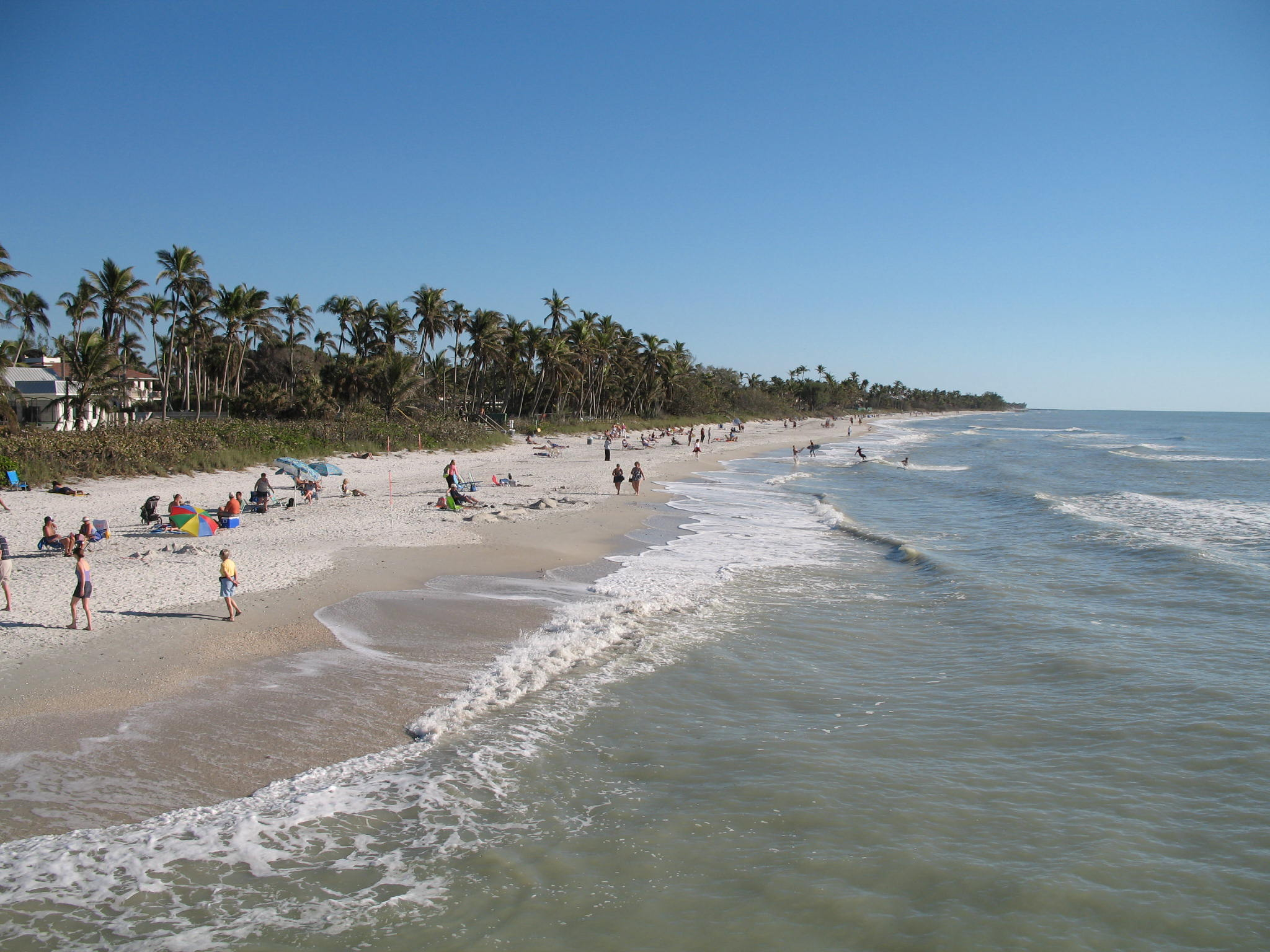
Visitors at the beach in Naples, Florida

If you can't find something to do in Florida, you're just boring ...

— Guy Fieri, celebrity chef, 2017

Tourism makes up one of the largest sectors of the state economy, with nearly 1.4 million people employed in the tourism industry in 2016 (a record for the state, surpassing the 1.2 million employment from 2015). Florida's tourism sector continues to be one of the strongest pillars of the state's economy, with consistent growth over the last decade. Recent research shows that tourist spending reached record highs, contributing billions to lodging, dining, transportation, and entertainment markets statewide (Visit Florida, 2024).

In 2015, Florida broke the 100-million visitor mark for the first time in state history by hosting a record 105 million visitors.

Many beach towns are popular tourist destinations, particularly during winter and spring break.

Amusement parks, especially in the Greater Orlando area, make up a significant portion of tourism. The Walt Disney World Resort is the most visited vacation resort in the world with more than 58 million visitors annually, consisting of four theme parks, 27 themed resort hotels, nine non-Disney hotels, two water parks, four golf courses and other recreational venues. Other major theme parks in the area include Universal Orlando Resort, SeaWorld Orlando and Busch Gardens Tampa.

Florida's many state parks and protected areas receive a lot of visitors as well with 25.2 million visitors visiting Florida State Parks in 2013.

Tourists also come to Florida to watch rocket launches in person. The Kennedy Space Center Visitor Complex received 1.7 million tourists in 2016.

As of 2024, Florida welcomed approximately 142.997 million tourists, representing a 1.7% increase from 2023.

According from many sources and calculations Visit Florida being among them that, the state of Florida received 143.3 million visitors in 2025, this is a 0.2% increase from 2024
