= Guest worker program =

Temporary program for foreign workers

‍A guest worker program allows foreign workers to temporarily work in a host country. Guest workers typically perform low or semi-skilled agricultural, industrial, or domestic labor in countries with workforce shortages, and they return home once their contract has expired. While migrant workers may move within a country to find labor, guest worker programs employ workers from areas outside of the host country. Guest workers are not considered immigrants due to the temporary nature of their contracts. Guest worker programs have been associated with low wages in these jobs.

== United States ==
In the United States, there have been efforts at guest worker programs for many years. These include the Bracero Program, enacted during World War II; attempts by the George W. Bush administration; and the current H-2A and H-2B visa programs. However, attempts at improving the programs have been ongoing and have been vigorously debated. While the United States' guest worker programs do not explicitly focus on any specific nationality, such plans typically target labor from Mexico, due to the shared border, the economic disparity, and the history of programs between the countries.

=== Bracero Program, 1942–64 ===
The Bracero Program was a temporary-worker importation agreement between the United States and Mexico from 1942 to 1964. Initially created in 1942 as an emergency procedure to alleviate wartime labor shortages, the program actually lasted until 1964, bringing approximately 4.5 million legal Mexican workers into the United States during its lifespan.

The Bracero Program expanded during the early 1950s, admitting more than 400,000 Mexican workers for temporary employment per year until 1959 when numbers began a steady decline. While illegal immigration was a concern of both the United States and Mexico, the Bracero Program was seen as a partial solution to the upsurge of undocumented worker entries.

Under the program, total farm employment skyrocketed, domestic farm worker employment decreased, and the farm wage rate decreased. Critics have noted widespread abuses of the program: workers had ten percent of their wages withheld for planned pensions but the money was often never repaid. Workers also were de-loused with DDT at border stations and were often placed in housing conditions deemed ‘highly inadequate’ by the Farm Service Agency. Other scholars who interviewed workers have highlighted some of the more positive aspects of the program, including the higher potential wages a bracero could earn in the United States. Due in large part to the growing opposition by organized labor and welfare groups, the program came to an end in 1964.

=== H-2 Program ===
As opposed to the agriculture-based Bracero Program, the H-2 Visa Program offers both agricultural and non-agricultural opportunities for guest workers in the United States. While both programs co-existed in the 1950s, the H-2 program employed guest workers on a much smaller scale, allowing the program to escape some of the criticism leveled at the Bracero Program.

The H-2 program is a nonimmigrant visa given on a temporary basis for "low-skilled labor" in the United States. The Immigration and Nationality Act (INA), also known as the McCarran-Walter Act, created the program in 1953. This act established a quota of (non)immigrants per country based on its population of the United States in 1920. Later, in 1986, the Immigration Reform and Control Act (IRCA) divided it into H-2A and H-2B. These two programs are administered through the Employment Training Administration (ETA) of the Department of Labor (DOL) and the US Citizenship and Immigration Services (USCIS) of the Department of Homeland Security (DHS).

==== H-2A vs. H-2B ====
The H-2A program is a program that enables farm owners to apply to the Department of Labor (DOL) to bring in "low-skilled laborers" for agricultural work. In contrast, the H-2B program is for all non-agricultural work. In both cases, this work must be temporary; however, to qualify for the H2-A program, the work must also be seasonal. The visa that is acquired by the worker is good for, at most, one year. However, it is possible to renew the visa for up to three years total.

==== Qualification/application ====
To qualify for the application in both programs, there are two essential components that must be fulfilled by the employer. After the following two qualifications are met, an employer is able to apply to the program for workers.

1. There must not be enough "able, willing, and qualified U.S. workers" for the position.
2. The employment of nonimmigrants "will not adversely affect the wages and working conditions of similarly employed U.S. workers."

=== Failed legislative attempts at reform ===
Most guest worker legislation introduced during the 105th through 110th Congress (January 1997 – 2003) solely discussed reforming the H-2A program. Reform provisions, which included a pathway under which guest workers could gain legal permanent residence status, were not enacted into law. Guest worker policy discussions in 2001 between President George W. Bush and Mexican President Vicente Fox were halted after the 9/11 terrorist attacks on the Twin Towers.

On January 7, 2004, President Bush reaffirmed his desire for guest worker program reform and laid forth plans for its implementation, known as the ‘Fair and Secure Immigration Reform’ program. According to the White House Press Secretary, this program laid out five specific policy goals:

1. Protecting the homeland by protecting our borders: the program should include efforts to control the United States border through agreements with participating countries.
2. Serve America's economy by matching a willing worker with a willing employer: the program should efficiently connect prospective workers with employers in the same sector.
3. Promoting compassion: the program should provide a temporary worker card to undocumented workers that allows them re-entry into the United States during their three years.
4. Providing incentives to return to home country: the program should require workers to return to their home countries after their work period has ended.
5. Protecting the rights of legal immigrants: the program should not be connected with obtaining a green card.

The program also contains specific agenda items for reformation of the guest worker programs already in effect:

1. Employers must make every reasonable effort to fill a position with American workers first.
2. Enforcement against companies hiring illegal immigrants will increase.
3. The United States will work with other countries to have guest workers included in their home country's retirement plans.
4. Those in the program can apply for citizenship, but will not be given any preference and will enter at the end of the line.
5. A reasonable increase in the number of legal immigrants into the United States.

The proposed program did not include a permanent legalization mechanism for guest workers. Bill S.2611, passed by the Senate in May 2006, included provisions for a guest worker program following the general guidelines of President Bush's proposed plan. No further action on the bill, however, was taken by the House, allowing to the bill to be defeated.

The Comprehensive Immigration Reform Act of 2007 was introduced by Senator Harry Reid (D- NV). It would have created a new visa class for temporary workers, allowing them to stay in the country for two years. It failed to pass; some attribute the bill's defeat to an approved amendment which would have ended the program after five years, leading to the loss of support for the bill in the business community.

=== Border Security, Economic Opportunity, and Immigration Modernization Act, 2013 ===
Following the 2012 presidential election in the United States, President Obama restated his desire for immigration reform, saying that "the time has come for common-sense, comprehensive immigration reform." A bipartisan group of senators interested in immigration reform began meeting to discuss the issue following the election. It grew from an initial six members to eight and has been given the name "Gang of Eight." The senators in this group are Marco Rubio (R-Fla.), John McCain (R-Ariz.), Lindsey Graham (R-S.C.), Jeff Flake (R-Ariz.), Dick Durbin (D-Ill), Robert Menendez (D-N.J.), Chuck Schumer (D-N.Y.), and Michael Bennet (D-Colo.).

Representatives of business and labor have negotiated the terms of a guest worker program for the current attempt at a comprehensive immigration bill. The U.S. Chamber of Commerce, which represents many American business interests, and the AFL–CIO, the nation's largest federation of unions, have been conducting ongoing talks. These two groups released a joint statement listing three points of agreement regarding any guest worker program on February 21, 2013.

1. American workers should have first priority for available jobs.
2. American firms should be able to hire foreign workers "without having to go through a cumbersome and inefficient process."
3. The system should be made more transparent and accurate by creating a "professional bureau" to report on labor needs in the United States.

After continuing talks, it was unofficially announced at the end of March that labor and business groups had come to an agreement regarding the conditions for a guest worker program. The legislation was introduced to the Senate on April 17, 2013, by Senator Chuck Schumer as the Border Security, Economic Opportunity, and Immigration Modernization Act of 2013.

==== W-visa ====
The proposed Act would create a new class of W-visas for lower-skilled temporary workers, as well as a new agency, the Bureau of Immigration and Labor Market Research (BILMR), to set annual caps on visas and monitor the program. The W-visa allows foreign workers to enter the United States to work for a "registered employer" in a "registered position." A registered employer must pay a fee to the Bureau and submit documentation to prove its legal status. An employer cannot be registered if it has been found in violation of minimum wage or overtime law, or has been cited for violation of OSHA or child labor provisions that resulted in serious injury or death in the three years prior to application. Registered employers must submit information about every position they wish to make registered and thus eligible for a W-visa holder.

The wage paid to W-visa holders must be the wage paid to other employees holding similar positions or the prevailing wage for that position in the area, whichever is higher. This had been a point of disagreement in earlier talks; the Chamber of Commerce wanted to set it at the federal minimum wage, whereas the AFL–CIO wanted it to be "indexed off the median wage."

Consistent with the joint statement released by the AFL–CIO and the Chamber of Commerce, W-visa holders cannot be hired if there are US workers ready and willing to take the position. They also cannot be hired to take the place of US workers who are striking or otherwise involved in a labor dispute, or if unemployment is higher than 8.5% in the local area.

W-visa holders will be entitled to the same labor rights as a US worker employed in a similar position would be. They can also not be treated as independent contractors. Additionally, they are entitled to protections against intimidation, threat, harassment and any other type of discrimination that may result from the W-visa holder alleging violations of the terms of employment or cooperating in an investigation of such violations by the employer. They will also not be required to remain with the same employer for their entire stay, but they must leave the country if unemployed for more than 60 consecutive days.

W-visas will allow foreigners to enter the country for three years to work and to renew it once for an additional three years. They may bring a spouse and children who are minors with them. The number of visas issued is a compromise between the Chamber of Commerce's original wish for 400,000 visas to be issued annually and the AFL–CIO’s starting position of 10,000 visas annually. They came to an agreement to have the number of visas start at 20,000 in the first year, increase to 35,000 in the second year, 55,000 the third year, and 75,000 the fourth year. Past that, the number of visas will be capped except in special circumstances, and the exact number will be determined by the BILMR.

=== Support ===
The proposed guest worker program is supported by several groups, including the U.S. Chamber of Commerce, the AFL–CIO, and Citizenship and Immigration Services. These groups have advocated a new guest worker program that satisfies their interests. Individuals have also testified in congressional hearings about the role of lower-skilled guest workers in the modern economy, advocating the need for a guest worker program, especially because of labor shortages in the United States. Proponents of a guest worker program note several benefits such programs could have for the parties involved.

==== Benefits for workers ====
Many scholars cite the economic gain to migrant workers as the largest benefit they receive by participating in guest worker programs. Participants in the Bracero Program earned more while working in the United States than they would have been able to earn in Mexico. This is particularly true of the agricultural industry, which hosts a large number of migrant workers through the H-2A visa program. Laborers in the US fruit and vegetable agriculture industry can make ten to fourteen times the amount that they would in Mexico. While poor working conditions have been an issue for migrant workers, formal guest worker programs "ha[ve] the possibility of markedly improving human rights standards." Guest worker programs also allow migrant workers to legally and securely cross the border.

==== U.S. economy ====
Proponents have argued that a guest worker program is necessary for U.S. employers to make up for labor shortages within the United States, particularly in "agricultural labor or services of a temporary or seasonal nature." Guest worker programs can "promote a healthy agricultural market in the U.S." by keeping supply levels up, prices for consumers down, and wages for workers down. It has also been argued that guest worker programs can help control immigration. In 2009, over 80 percent of agricultural workers in the United States did not have the proper legal documentation necessary for employment. Guest worker programs can help cut down on undocumented workers by allowing the Immigration and Naturalization Service to "secur[e] the cooperation of growers who [are] hiring workers illegally."

==== Mexican economy ====
Scholars suggest that a guest worker program also has the potential to be beneficial for labor-supplying countries by reducing poverty. In a study of the effects of the Bracero Program, Mexico's Ministry of Labor and Social Welfare found that over 96 percent of workers had sent money back to their families in Mexico. This not only has the potential to reduce the poverty of the families, but it can also stimulate the Mexican economy. Further analysis of the Bracero Program revealed that sending workers to the U.S. alleviated the strain on the Mexico's resources and helped combat domestic unemployment by encouraging citizens to seek work abroad.

=== Criticism ===
There is a consensus among legal experts that America's guest worker programs have had unintended negative consequences. Since the establishment of the Bracero Program, America's guest worker programs have been accused of creating abusive working conditions, withholding payments, lowering wages for domestic farm workers, and providing inadequate incentives for workers to return to their home countries. Labor groups, such as Laborers' International Union of North America, United Food and Commercial Workers International Union, and the International Brotherhood of Boilermakers, are sensitive to the American guest worker program's history of rights violations and have advocated for lower caps on the number of guest workers allowed in the United States.

==== Civil rights ====
Proponents of guest worker programs assert that a lack of government regulation, which gave American growers more influence over the recruitment and employment of guest workers, created an opportunity for the corruption and abuse traditionally linked to the Bracero Program and set a precedent of unethical practices for following guest worker programs. Others add that a lack of government involvement by both the United States and the guest workers' country of residency is to blame for the prevalence of payment withholding. Research suggest that guest workers are more willing to endure abusive environments and low wages, regardless of the labor rights they are given under the visa programs, due their inability to switch employers and lack of social safety nets. Labor rights violations under the current guest worker program are alleged to include threatening workers with assault and blacklisting workers who report illegal activity, threatening the physical well-being of employees’ families, and requiring inhumane working hours. America's programs have been criticized for failing to improve working conditions. Referring to America's guest worker program, Former House Ways and Means Committee Chairman Charles Rangel commented, "This guestworker program’s the closest thing I’ve ever seen to slavery."

==== Illegal immigration ====
America's guest worker programs have been criticized for not properly addressing the issue of lingering immigrants. Experts suggest that the relocation of recruitment sites from populated cities to less populated areas encourages migrants to enter the U.S. illegally if they were turned away at the recruitment office to make up for the economic cost of travel. This practice may further depress wages and complicate the recruitment process by increasing illegal immigration. To mitigate inherent wage decreases, America's current guest worker program establishes a price floor for registered guest worker wages. Experts are skeptical of this approach, as it may discourage the use of legal guest workers, leading growers to employ cheaper, undocumented laborers.

==== Effectiveness ====
The effectiveness of guest worker programs has been a source of disagreement among scholars. Accounts from agricultural employers purport that most employers do not use the program to recruit workers. A recent article in the Los Angeles Times reported that about 6% of farm workers are employed via H-2A Visas and that undocumented workers account for most of agricultural labor. An article published by Florida Farmers Incorporated reported similarly low levels of participation among Florida citrus growers and suggested that the current guest worker program is unpopular because of the complicated, expensive, and time-consuming process of acquiring H-2A visas.

The success of the current migrant worker system has yet to be completely evaluated. Those who have attempted to calculate and predict the success of guest worker programs have found the process to be very speculative. In an analysis of the United States' guest worker program, legal expert Aili Palmunen wrote, "it is difficult if not impossible to give a concrete estimate of who will participate in this program."

== Outside the United States ==
Countries outside of the United States that have used guest worker programs in the past or currently have programs in place include Singapore, Canada, Taiwan, northern and western European countries including Austria, Belgium, Denmark, France, Germany, Luxembourg, the Netherlands, Norway, Sweden, Switzerland, and the United Kingdom, and eastern European countries such as the Czech Republic, Bulgaria, Hungary, and Poland.

The Canadian Seasonal Agricultural Workers Program, started in 1966 as a labor migration agreement with Jamaica. Later the program expanded to other commonwealth countries in the Caribbean, and in 1974 to Mexico. While similar to the Bracero Program in that it uses temporary workers to fill labor shortages, the Canadian Program differs in its provided working and living conditions, more bureaucratic recruitment practices, and smaller size. The Mexican Ministry of Labor recruits workers and negotiates wages with Human Resources Development Canada. Farmers are required to offer workers a minimum of 240 work hours over six weeks, provide free approved housing and cooking facilities, and pay the higher of the minimum or prevailing wage given to Canadians performing the same labor. Most Mexican workers are male, married, and over 25 years of age, who leave their families behind in Mexico; their average stay in Canada is four months.

In 1990, Taiwan introduced a formal guest worker program that allowed workers from Thailand, the Philippines, and Indonesia entry under one-year visas. Under the Employment Services Act of 1992, temporary guest workers from these countries were permitted to work in Taiwan's manufacturing, construction, and services sectors. As a protection mechanism for local workers, the Taiwanese government has set quotas for the percentage of foreign workers that each industry sector is allowed to hire.

In response to wartime physical and capital losses, West Germany imported guest workers after the end of World War II to speed up the postwar reconstruction process. The Federal Labor Office recruited low and semi-skilled workers from Mediterranean countries; the initial bilateral agreement was with Italy, the program expanded to include Greece, Turkey, Morocco, Portugal, Tunisia and Yugoslavia. Workers were required to obtain a residence permit and a labor permit, which were granted for restricted time periods and valid only for certain industries. Of the countries providing labor, recruits from Turkey accounted for the largest portion; approximately 750,000 Turks entered the country between 1961 and 1972. The program came to an end in 1973.

For decades, the United Kingdom allowed fruit and vegetable growers to recruit seasonal agricultural workers through the Seasonal Agricultural Workers Scheme (SAWS). Although not originally called SAWS, the program existed in some form since 1943. Using data from the UK Home Office, human geographer Sam Scott from the University of Gloucestershire found that the quota for workers was approximately 3000 each year until the early 1990s, but afterwards increased, peaking in 2004 with around 25,000 workers. According to the UK Government, as of 2013, a third of the workers recruited were from Bulgaria and Romania, and half of the workers were from the EU8 (the Czech Republic, Estonia, Hungary, Latvia, Lithuania, Poland, Slovakia, and Slovenia). In 2014, the SAWS ended.

== See also ==
- Exploitation of labour
- Frisch elasticity of labor supply
- Labour economics
- Gastarbeiter
- Temporary foreign worker program in Canada
- Wage slavery
