= Florida wine =

Wine made from grapes grown in Florida, United States

Florida
- Wine region
- Official name: State of Florida
- Type: U.S. State Appellation
- Years of wine industry: 443
- Country: United States
- Total area: 53,997 square miles (34,558,080 acres)
- Grapes produced: Blanc du Bois, Muscadine, Noble, Scuppernong, Stover
- Varietals produced: Mango, Key Lime, Orange, Strawberry, Blueberry
- No. of wineries: 35

Florida wine refers to wine made from grapes and other fruit grown in the U.S. state of Florida. Wine grapes were grown in Florida earlier than anywhere else in North America.

== History ==
The first wine grapes were planted in the 16th century by Spanish missionaries for the production of sacramental wine for Christian religious ceremonies. Because of the tropical climate and grapevine diseases, particularly Pierce's disease, vitis vinifera does not grow well in Florida.

The Florida Wine Grape Growers Association (FWGGA) was established in 1923. In the 1930s, researchers at the University of Florida helped develop new hybrid grape varieties from the indigenous Muscadine to be more ecologically suitable for Florida's climate, including Blanc du Bois, Stover, Swanee, Daytona, Orlando Seedless and Miss Blanc.

As early as 1991 Florida Orange Groves Winery began to develop wines made from 100% tropical fruit. Thanks to their efforts the term Florida Wine now encompasses varieties like mango, key lime, orange, grapefruit, blueberry and strawberry. Following in the footsteps of Florida Orange Groves Winery are several other wineries located in Florida now experimenting with tropical fruits. There are no designated American Viticultural Areas in Florida.

== See also ==
- Agriculture in Florida
