= H-2B visa =

Seasonal non-agricultural worker visa for the United States

The H-2B visa nonimmigrant program permits employers to hire foreign workers to come temporarily to the United States and perform temporary nonagricultural services or labor on a one-time, seasonal, peakload or intermittent basis.

The H-2B visa classification requires the United States Secretary of Homeland Security to consult with appropriate agencies before admitting H-2B non-immigrants. Homeland Security regulations require that, except for Guam, the petitioning employer first apply for a temporary Labor Condition Application from the United States Secretary of Labor indicating that: (1) there are not sufficient U.S. workers who are capable of performing the temporary services or labor at the time of filing the petition for H-2B classification and at the place where the foreign worker is to perform the work; and (2) the employment of the foreign worker will not adversely affect the wages and working conditions of similarly employed U.S. workers. The Department of Labor will review and process all H-2B applications on a first in, first out basis.

Employers seeking to employ temporary H-2B workers must apply for Temporary Employment Certification to the Chicago National Processing Center (NPC). An employer may submit a request for multiple unnamed foreign workers as long as each worker is to perform the same services or labor, on the same terms and conditions, in the same occupation, in the same area of intended employment during the same period of employment. Certification is issued to the employer, not the worker, and is not transferable from one employer to another or from one worker to another.

== Temporary increases ==
Although capped at 66,000 per year, the H-2B numerical cap was increased in 2017 by then United States Secretary of Homeland Security John Kelly. These visas were made available only to American businesses which attested that they would likely suffer irreparable harm without the ability to employ all the H-2B workers requested in their original petition.

== Statistics ==
Below are H-2B visas issued each year as released by the U.S. Department of State - Bureau of Consular Affairs.

Fiscal Year	Total number of H-2B visas issued
1987	62
1988	683
1989	9,575
1990	11,843
1991	14,573
1992	12,552
1993	9,691
1994	10,400
1995	11,737
1996	12,200
1997	15,706
1998	20,192
1999	30,642
2000	45,037
2001	58,215
2002	62,591
2003	78,955
2004	76,169
2005	87,492
2006	71,687
2007	60,227
2008	94,304
2009	44,847
2010	47,403
2011	50,826
2012	50,009
2013	57,600
2014	68,102
2015	69,684
2016	84,627
2017	83,600
2018	83,774
2019	97,623
2020	61,865
2021	95,053

== See also ==
- Guest worker program
- H-2A Visa
