= Adverse Effect Wage Rate =

Minimum wage for some US agricultural workers

The Adverse Effect Wage Rate (AEWR) is the minimum wage that the U.S. Department of Labor (DOL) has determined "must be offered and paid to U.S. and alien workers by agricultural employers of nonimmigrant H-2A visa agricultural workers" (Federal Register, February 10, 1999, p. 6690). Where agricultural employers offer employment to nonimmigrant foreign workers, payment of at least the AEWR is required. Published once a year, usually in early February, by DOL with the assistance of the U.S. Department of Agriculture, the AEWR sets a separate minimum wage rate (i.e., a rate that will not adversely affect the employment opportunities of U.S. workers) for each state (see 20 CFR 655).
