= Pyrimethanil =

Names
- Preferred IUPAC name 4,6-Dimethyl-N-phenylpyrimidin-2-amine

Identifiers
CAS Number	53112-28-0
3D model (JSmol)	Interactive image
ChEBI	CHEBI:8674
ChEMBL	ChEMBL540677
ChemSpider	82753
ECHA InfoCard	100.101.334
KEGG	C11180
PubChem CID	91650
UNII	6IA5HP6C8Z
CompTox Dashboard (EPA)	DTXSID8034877
- InChI: InChI=1S/C12H13N3/c1-9-8-10(2)14-12(13-9)15-11-6-4-3-5-7-11/h3-8H,1-2H3,(H,13,14,15) Key: ZLIBICFPKPWGIZ-UHFFFAOYSA-N; InChI=1/C12H13N3/c1-9-8-10(2)14-12(13-9)15-11-6-4-3-5-7-11/h3-8H,1-2H3,(H,13,14,15) Key: ZLIBICFPKPWGIZ-UHFFFAOYAU
- SMILES: Cc1cc(nc(n1)Nc2ccccc2)C

Properties
Chemical formula	C_{12}H_{13}N_{3}
Molar mass	199.257 g·mol^{−1}
Density	1.15 g/cm^{3}
Melting point	96.3 °C (205.3 °F; 369.4 K)
- Except where otherwise noted, data are given for materials in their standard state (at 25 °C [77 °F], 100 kPa). verify (what is ?) Infobox references

Pyrimethanil is a broad spectrum fungicide often applied to seeds. It inhibits methionine biosynthesis, thus affecting protein formation and subsequent cell division. Pyrimethanil works best on young fungus infestations.

== See also ==
- Pyrimethanil in the Pesticide Properties DataBase (PPDB)
