= North Florida Broadband Authority =

Government entity

The North Florida Broadband Authority, abbreviated NFBA, is a government entity established to deploy broadband Internet services in north Florida.

== History ==
NFBA was first created in 2009 through an interlocal agreement between Baker, Bradford, Columbia, Dixie, Gilchrist, Hamilton, Jefferson, Lafayette, Levy, Madison, Putnam, Suwannee, Taylor, Union and Wakulla counties.

The initial goal was to win a federal grant under the Broadband Technology Opportunities Program through the American Recovery and Reinvestment Act of 2009 and deploy a middle mile broadband transport network in underserved rural areas of Florida.

NFBA applied for a $30 million grant through the program in August 2009, winning the grant in February 2010.

== Organization ==
Florida law allows municipal governments to create a single entity through interlocal agreements.

NFBA operates much like an independent utility, similar to a water, sewer or electrical utility. It is subject to government open records laws, and provide full accounting of expenditures to the federal government.

=== Rural Area of Critical Economic Concern ===
The NFBA geographic area is known as a Rural Area of Critical Economic Concern through Florida's Rural Economic Development Initiative, or REDI.

Rural counties qualify for REDI with populations of less than 100,000 and exhibit low per capita income, low per capital taxable values, high unemployment or underemployment, and other poor economic factors.

The designation is provided by the Governor's Office of Tourism, Trade and Economic Development, and are re-evaluated each year for REDI eligibility.

== Middle Mile Project ==
When completed, the NFBA broadband project will deliver up to 1 Gbps capacity throughout the region, more than 600 times the current capacity available to public and private entities in the region.

The system is being designed using microwave links, sending data wirelessly from one focused point to the next using existing cellular towers.

This network, when commercial Internet service providers connect with it, will provide broadband Internet to approximately 154,000 households, 26,890 businesses, 1,570 critical facilities and 265 healthcare entities.
