= H-2A visa =

Seasonal agricultural worker visa for the United States

An H-2A visa allows a foreign national worker into the United States for temporary agricultural work. The H-2A temporary agricultural program establishes a means for agricultural employers who anticipate a shortage of domestic workers to bring non-immigrant foreign workers to the U.S. to perform agricultural labor or services of a temporary or seasonal nature.

In 2025 there were approximately 400,000 total temporary agricultural workers admitted to the U.S. under H-2A visas. H-2A workers are only legally authorized to work for one employer and may not remain in the U.S. after their visa expires. The terms of employment for H-2A workers - including wages, housing, job duties, and hours of work - must be approved in advance by the U.S. Department of Labor. Unlike other guest worker programs, there is no cap on the number of H-2A visas allocated each year.

== Employing H-2A workers ==
=== Wages ===
The wage or rate of pay must be the same for U.S. workers and H-2A workers. The hourly rate must be at least as high as the applicable Adverse Effect Wage Rate (AEWR), federal or state minimum wage, or the applicable prevailing hourly wage rate, whichever is higher. The AEWR is established every year by the Department of Labor for every state except Alaska.

If a worker will be paid on a piece rate basis, the worker must be paid the prevailing piece rate as determined by the State Workers Agency (SWA). If the piece rate does not result in average hourly piece rate earnings during the pay period at least equal to the amount the worker would have earned had the worker been paid at the hourly rate, then the worker's pay must be supplemented to the equivalent hourly level. The piece rate offered must be no less than what is prevailing in the area for the same crop and/or activity.

=== Hiring ===
Hiring means an active effort, including newspaper and radio advertising in areas of expected labor supply. Such recruitment must be at least equivalent to that conducted by non-H-2A agricultural employers in the same or similar crops and area to secure U.S. workers. This must be an effort independent of and in addition to the efforts of the SWA for at least 15 days. In establishing worker qualifications and/or job specifications, the employer must designate only those qualifications and specifications which are essential to carrying out the job and which are normally required by other employers who do not hire foreign workers.

=== Livelihood of workers ===
==== Housing and meals ====
The employer must provide free housing to all workers who are not reasonably able to return to their homes or residences the same day. Such housing must be inspected and approved according to appropriate standards. The housing provided by the employer must meet all of the Department of Labor Occupational Safety and Health Administration (OSHA) standards that were set forth at CFR 1910.142 or the full set of standards at 654.404-645.417.

An alternative form of housing is rental housing, which has to meet local or state health and safety standards. In North Carolina, the current state standards include no provision for doors and windows, 75 ft^{3} per person or 27 people per refrigerator, one wash tub per 30 people with hot and cold water, facilities for drying clothes; there are no sanitary requirements for mattresses provided, 1 toilet/15 people or 1 urinal/25 men, and 1 shower per 10 people with no privacy stalls.

The employer must either provide three meals a day to each of the workers or furnish free and convenient cooking and kitchen for workers to prepare and cook their own meals. If the employer provides the meals, then the employer has the right to charge each worker a certain amount per day for the three meals.

==== Transportation and tools ====
There are several provisions on the transportation of workers. The amount of transportation payment shall be no less (and shall not be required to be more) than the most economical and reasonably similar to the transportation charges for the distances involved. The employer is responsible for several forms of transportation depending on the situation. After the worker completes at least half of the work contract period, the employer must reimburse the worker for the costs of transportation and subsistence from the place of recruitment to the place of work if these expenses were charged to the worker. The employer must provide free transportation to the worker between the employer's housing and the area of work. And upon completion of the work contract, the employer must pay the costs of a worker's subsistence and transportation back to the place of recruitment. Some special conditions apply when the worker does not return to the area of recruitment because they are moving to another job. If the employer compensates foreign workers for transportation costs then they must do so for U.S. workers as well. If the employer provides transportation for foreign workers, they must provide transportation to US workers as well.

The employer must cover the cost of tools and supplies necessary to carry out the work at no cost to the worker, unless this is uncommon and the occupation calls for the worker to provide certain items.

=== California ===
California's labor-intensive, multi-crop agriculture historically limited use of the H-2A program, but a 2019 analysis reported that H-2A employment in the state grew during the 2010s, including through farm labor contractors, partly because high housing costs in major agricultural regions increased the value of employer-provided housing.

== Application process ==
The process in order for a worker to be able to start in H-2A status involves a job order from a State Workforce Agency, a Temporary Labor Certification from the U.S. Department of Labor Employment & Training Administration's Office of Foreign Labor Certification, a Form I-129 approval from the U.S. Citizenship and Immigration Services (a branch of the U.S. Department of Homeland Security), a visa from a consular officer representing the U.S. Department of State, and a Form I-94 issued by U.S. Customs and Border Protection at a port of entry.

=== Job order (ETA Form 790) ===
A job offer (ETA Form 790) must be filed with the State Workforce Agency (SWA) in the area of intended employment between 60 and 75 days before the date of need for workers. Each State Workforce Agency has a mailing address and some have websites, contact email addresses, and phone numbers. The State Workforce Agency is also responsible for handling job orders for the H-2B visa, but the specific contact person or mailing address may differ. The job orders are publicly listed by the State Workforce Agency (including on their website). Additionally, the employer must advertise for the position in local newspapers. Any United States citizen who applies for the job must be given one.

=== H-2A Temporary Labor Certification from the U.S. Department of Labor ===
The employer needs to obtain a Temporary Labor Certification (TLC) from the United States Department of Labor Employment & Training Administration's Office of Foreign Labor Certification. Note that this labor certification should not be confused with PERM labor certification for employment-based permanent immigration, or with the Labor Condition Application for H-1B and similar statuses. It is also separate from a similar process for H-2B temporary labor certification.

The application package must include ETA Form 9142A and an accepted Job Order (ETA Form 790) from the State Workforce Agency. It must be filed with the Chicago National Processing Center or online through the iCert portal, no less than 45 days prior to the employer's date of need.

In order to approve the certification, the Department must verify that:

1. there are not sufficient able, willing, and qualified U.S. workers available to perform the temporary and seasonal agricultural employment for which nonimmigrant foreign workers are being requested; and
2. employment of H-2A workers will not adversely affect the wages and working conditions of similarly employed U.S. workers. The statute and Departmental regulations provide numerous worker protections and employer requirements with respect to wages and working conditions. The Department's Wage and Hour Division (WHD) has responsibility for enforcing provisions of worker contracts.

=== Form I-129 petition submitted to U.S. Citizenship and Immigration Services ===
The employer must submit a Form I-129 (Petition for a Nonimmigrant Worker) on behalf of the prospective worker (beneficiary) with the United States Citizenship and Immigration Services, with the job order (ETA Form 790) and the approved H-2A Temporary Labor Certification as initial evidence. Note that Form I-129 is used for a large number of nonimmigrant worker statuses, not just the H-2A. Those using it for the H-2A status need to fill the main form followed by the H classification supplement, Pages 13–17.

The H-2A status is one of the statuses where it is possible for a single Form I-129 to be used for multiple beneficiaries. Additional beneficiaries may be listed on Attachment 1 (Pages 35–36) of Form I-129. However, all beneficiaries listed in a single petition must have the same requested start and end date, and they are all approved together. In case different start dates are needed for different beneficiaries, or one of them has a more complicated situation (so that beneficiary's petition may be delayed) employers are advised to file separate I-129s for such employees.

The filing fee for Form I-129 is $460. Forms are automatically expedited given the seasonal and time-sensitive nature of agricultural work, but it is also possible to request Premium Processing Service for $1225 to get an initial response within 15 calendar days.

In general, Form I-129 petitions can be submitted six months in advance of the job start date. However, since the petition's initial evidence includes a job order, that must be filed between 60 and 75 days before the start date, the application can effectively be submitted at most 75 days prior to the start date.

==== Eligible Countries List ====
United States Citizenship and Immigration Services is given an Eligible Countries List for H-2 visas (with slight differences between the H-2A and H-2B) and generally approves petitions only if the beneficiary is from a country on the list. Updates to the Eligible Countries List are published in the Federal Register. Effective January 18, 2016 the Eligible Countries List contains 84 countries, and the full list can be found on the USCIS website. The list has expanded since it originally started: 16 new countries having been added as recently as November 2015.

According to official regulations, a national from a country not on the list may only be the beneficiary of an approved H-2A petition if the Secretary of Homeland Security determines that it is in the U.S. interest for him or her to be the beneficiary of such a petition.

A country may be added to the list based on a recommendation from the U.S. Department of State, the country's government, an employer that would like to hire nationals of the country in H-2A status, or any other interested party or parties. When designating countries to include on the list, the Secretary of Homeland Security, with the concurrence of the Secretary of State, will take into account factors including, but not limited to:

1. The country's cooperation with issuing travel documents for citizens, subjects, nationals and residents of that country who are subject to a final order of removal;
2. The number of final and unexecuted (meaning completed but not yet carried out) orders of removal against citizens, subjects, nationals and residents of that country;
3. The number of orders of removal executed against citizens, subjects, nationals and residents of that country; and
4. Other factors as may serve the U.S. interest.

=== Visa application ===
If the beneficiary is already in the United States in a valid status and with no requirement to leave the United States, the beneficiary can simply transition to H-2A status. If the beneficiary is outside the United States, two additional steps are needed:

- The beneficiary must apply for a H-2A visa to a United States consulate in his or her home country with the approved Form I-129 petition, ETA Form 790, approved Temporary Labor Certification, and other necessary documents. The visa decision is made by a consular officer representing the U.S. Department of State.
- Armed with the H-2A visa and other documents, the beneficiary may present himself or herself at a port of entry, where an officer working for U.S. Customs and Border Protection issues the beneficiary a Form I-94 for H-2A status.

== Validity ==
=== Basic rules ===
Below are the basic rules governing the H-2A status:

- Each Form I-129 petition for initial employment or extension of employment can be for a duration of at most one year.
- After the worker has completed three years in H-2A status, the worker must leave the United States for at least three months before being able to return in H-2A status. In fact, the rules count continuous stay across all H statuses for the purpose of counting the three years.

=== Calculation of interrupted stay ===
For workers who leave the United States temporarily, the following rules apply with respect to excluding time outside the United States:

- If the worker was in the United States for 18 months or less, then H-2 time is interrupted if the worker is outside the United States for at least 45 days but less than 3 months. This means that time spent outside the United States will not count toward the 3-year limit, but rather, upon return, the worker's clock will resume from where it left off at the time of departure.
- If the worker has been in the United States for somewhere between 18 months and 3 years, the worker's H-2 time is interrupted if the worker is outside the United States for at least 2 months but less than 3 months.

Note that the time needed outside the United States in order to qualify for an interrupted stay exceeds the maximum time permissible for automatic visa revalidation, which is 30 days.

If the worker is outside the United States for 3 months or more, the worker's clock is completely reset, and whenever the worker next returns on a H-2 visa, the worker's time in the United States starts from zero.

== History ==
=== Introduction in 1986 ===
The Immigration and Nationality Act of 1952 introduced a temporary unskilled worker category, the H-2 category. The Immigration Reform and Control Act of 1986 subdivided this category into two subcategories: the H-2A (an uncapped category for temporary agricultural workers) and H-2B (a capped category for temporary workers in other domains). The particular importance given to temporary agricultural workers was intended to balance the potential decline in the illegal immigrant population due to the increased border security and immigration enforcement provisions of the Act.

=== Introduction of Premium Processing Service in 2001 ===
On June 1, 2001, the Premium Processing Service was introduced at a price of $1000, available for Form I-129 petitions for most statuses, including the H-2A status. In November 2010, the Premium Processing Service fee was hiked from $1000 to $1225 as part of a general change to the fee schedule for USCIS forms.

=== Changes to the Eligible Countries List ===
The Eligible Countries List for the H-2A was created through a rule published by the U.S. Department of Homeland Security on December 18, 2008, and effective January 17, 2009. The list has grown gradually from 28 countries in the beginning to 84 countries as of 2016. Summarized below are the dates of various Federal Register announcements on updates to the list, with the total number of countries, number of new countries added, and the names of the new countries added. The dates listed below are the announcement dates. The date that the list becomes effective may be a little after the announcement date. Generally, updated lists become effective starting around January 17 or January 18 of the year.

Date	Size of Eligible Countries List	Number of new countries	Number of removed countries	Full list	New countries	Removed countries
December 18, 2008	28			Argentina, Australia, Belize, Brazil, Bulgaria, Canada, Chile, Costa Rica, Dominican Republic, El Salvador, Guatemala, Honduras, Indonesia, Israel, Jamaica, Japan, Mexico, Moldova, New Zealand, Peru, Philippines, Poland, Romania, South Africa, South Korea, Turkey, Ukraine, United Kingdom		
January 19, 2010	39	11	0	Argentina, Australia, Belize, Brazil, Bulgaria, Canada, Chile, Costa Rica, Croatia, Dominican Republic, Ecuador, El Salvador, Ethiopia, Guatemala, Honduras, Indonesia, Ireland, Israel, Jamaica, Japan, Lithuania, Mexico, Moldova, Netherlands, Nicaragua, New Zealand, Norway, Peru, Philippines, Poland, Romania, Serbia, Slovakia, South Africa, South Korea, Turkey, Ukraine, United Kingdom, Uruguay	Croatia, Ecuador, Ethiopia, Indonesia, Ireland, Lithuania, Netherlands, Nicaragua, Norway, Serbia, Uruguay	--
January 18, 2011	53	15	1	Argentina, Australia, Barbados, Belize, Brazil, Bulgaria, Canada, Chile, Costa Rica, Croatia, Dominican Republic, Ecuador, El Salvador, Estonia, Ethiopia, Fiji, Guatemala, Honduras, Hungary, Ireland, Israel, Jamaica, Japan, Kiribati, Latvia, Lithuania, Macedonia, Mexico, Moldova, Nauru, Netherlands, Nicaragua, New Zealand, Norway, Papua New Guinea, Peru, Philippines, Poland, Romania, Samoa, Serbia, Slovakia, Slovenia, Solomon Islands, South Africa, South Korea, Tonga, Turkey, Tuvalu, Ukraine, United Kingdom, Uruguay, Vanuatu	Barbados, Estonia, Fiji, Hungary, Kiribati, Latvia, Macedonia, Nauru, Papua New Guinea, Samoa, Slovenia, Solomon Islands, Tonga, Tuvalu, Vanuatu	Indonesia
January 18, 2012	58	5	0	Argentina, Australia, Barbados, Belize, Brazil, Bulgaria, Canada, Chile, Costa Rica, Croatia, Dominican Republic, Ecuador, El Salvador, Estonia, Ethiopia, Fiji, Guatemala, Haiti, Honduras, Hungary, Iceland, Ireland, Israel, Jamaica, Japan, Kiribati, Latvia, Lithuania, Macedonia, Mexico, Moldova, Montenegro, Nauru, Netherlands, Nicaragua, New Zealand, Norway, Papua New Guinea, Peru, Philippines, Poland, Romania, Samoa, Serbia, Slovakia, Slovenia, Solomon Islands, South Africa, South Korea, Spain, Switzerland, Tonga, Turkey, Tuvalu, Ukraine, United Kingdom, Uruguay, Vanuatu	Haiti, Iceland, Montenegro, Spain, Switzerland	--
January 18, 2013	59	1	0	Argentina, Australia, Barbados, Belize, Brazil, Bulgaria, Canada, Chile, Costa Rica, Croatia, Dominican Republic, Ecuador, El Salvador, Estonia, Ethiopia, Fiji, Grenada, Guatemala, Haiti, Honduras, Hungary, Iceland, Ireland, Israel, Jamaica, Japan, Kiribati, Latvia, Lithuania, Macedonia, Mexico, Moldova, Montenegro, Nauru, Netherlands, Nicaragua, New Zealand, Norway, Papua New Guinea, Peru, The Philippines, Poland, Romania, Samoa, Serbia, Slovakia, Slovenia, Solomon Islands, South Africa, South Korea, Spain, Switzerland, Tonga, Turkey, Tuvalu, Ukraine, United Kingdom, Uruguay, Vanuatu	Grenada	--
January 17, 2014	63	4	0	Argentina, Australia, Austria, Barbados, Belize, Brazil, Bulgaria, Canada, Chile, Costa Rica, Croatia, Dominican Republic, Ecuador, El Salvador, Estonia, Ethiopia, Fiji, Grenada, Guatemala, Haiti, Honduras, Hungary, Iceland, Ireland, Israel, Italy, Jamaica, Japan, Kiribati, Latvia, Lithuania, Macedonia, Mexico, Moldova, Montenegro, Nauru, Netherlands, Nicaragua, New Zealand, Norway, Panama, Papua New Guinea, Peru, Philippines, Poland, Romania, Samoa, Serbia, Slovakia, Slovenia, Solomon Islands, South Africa, South Korea, Spain, Switzerland, Thailand, Tonga, Turkey, Tuvalu, Ukraine, United Kingdom, Uruguay, Vanuatu	Austria, Italy, Panama, Thailand	--
December 16, 2014	68	5	0	Argentina, Australia, Austria, Barbados, Belize, Brazil, Bulgaria, Canada, Chile, Costa Rica, Croatia, Czech Republic, Denmark, Dominican Republic, Ecuador, El Salvador, Estonia, Ethiopia, Fiji, Grenada, Guatemala, Haiti, Honduras, Hungary, Iceland, Ireland, Israel, Italy, Jamaica, Japan, Kiribati, Latvia, Lithuania, Macedonia, Madagascar, Mexico, Moldova, Montenegro, Nauru, The Netherlands, Nicaragua, New Zealand, Norway, Panama, Papua New Guinea, Peru, The Philippines, Poland, Portugal, Romania, Samoa, Serbia, Slovakia, Slovenia, Solomon Islands, South Africa, South Korea, Spain, Sweden, Switzerland, Thailand, Tonga, Turkey, Tuvalu, Ukraine, United Kingdom, Uruguay, Vanuatu	Czech Republic, Denmark, Madagascar, Portugal, Sweden	--
November 18, 2015	84	16	0	Andorra, Argentina, Australia, Austria, Barbados, Belgium, Belize, Brazil, Brunei, Bulgaria, Canada, Chile, Colombia, Costa Rica, Croatia, Czech Republic, Denmark, Dominican Republic, Ecuador, El Salvador, Estonia, Ethiopia, Fiji, Finland, France, Germany, Greece, Grenada, Guatemala, Haiti, Honduras, Hungary, Iceland, Ireland, Israel, Italy, Jamaica, Japan, Kiribati, Latvia, Liechtenstein, Lithuania, Luxembourg, Macedonia, Madagascar, Malta, Mexico, Moldova, Monaco, Montenegro, Nauru, The Netherlands, Nicaragua, New Zealand, Norway, Panama, Papua New Guinea, Peru,The Philippines, Poland, Portugal, Romania, Samoa, San Marino, Serbia, Singapore, Slovakia, Slovenia, Solomon Islands, South Africa, South Korea, Spain, Sweden, Switzerland, Taiwan, Thailand, Timor-Leste, Tonga, Turkey, Tuvalu, Ukraine, United Kingdom, Uruguay, Vanuatu	Andorra, Belgium, Brunei, Colombia, Finland, France, Germany, Greece, Liechtenstein, Luxembourg, Malta, Monaco, San Marino, Singapore, Taiwan, Timor-Leste	--
January 18, 2018	83	2	3	Andorra, Argentina, Australia, Austria, Barbados, Belgium, Brazil, Brunei, Bulgaria, Canada, Chile, Colombia, Costa Rica, Croatia, Czech Republic, Denmark, Dominican Republic, Ecuador, El Salvador, Ethiopia, Estonia, Fiji, Finland, France, Germany, Greece, Grenada, Guatemala, Honduras, Hungary, Iceland, Ireland, Israel, Italy, Jamaica, Japan, Kiribati, Latvia, Liechtenstein, Lithuania, Luxembourg, Macedonia, Madagascar, Malta, Mexico, Moldova, Monaco, Mongolia, Montenegro, Nauru, The Netherlands, Nicaragua, New Zealand, Norway, Panama, Papua New Guinea, Peru, The Philippines, Poland, Portugal, Romania, San Marino, Serbia, Singapore, Slovakia, Slovenia, Solomon Islands, South Africa, South Korea, Spain, St. Vincent and the Grenadines, Sweden, Switzerland, Taiwan, Thailand, Timor-Leste, Tonga, Turkey, Tuvalu, Ukraine, United Kingdom, Uruguay, Vanuatu	Mongolia, St. Vincent and the Grenadines	Belize, Haiti, Samoa

== Statistics ==
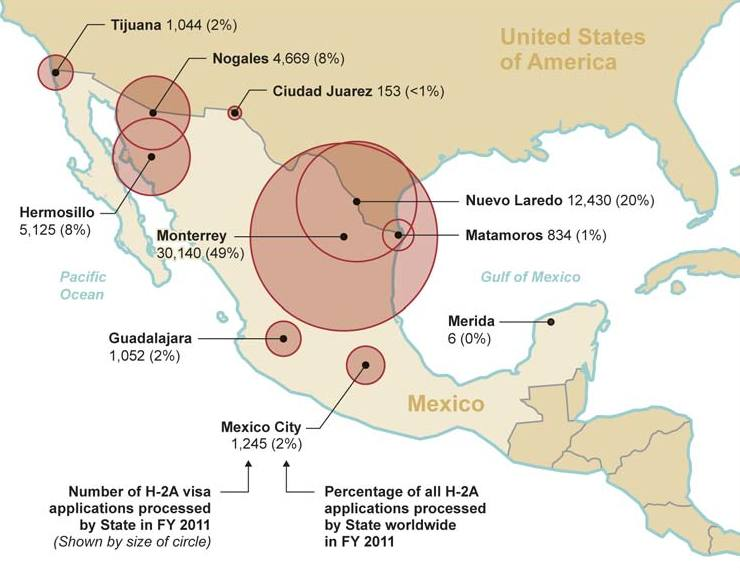
Graphic from the Government Accountability Office showing the number of H-2A visas processed in Mexico according to location in the year 2011

=== Visa approvals by fiscal year and country ===
Note that the count below is of the number of visas issued by a United States consular officer. The years here are Fiscal Years, so for instance the year 2004 refers to the period from October 1, 2003, to September 30, 2004. These should approximately match but may not exactly match with the number of Form I-129 approvals of H-2A status by the United States Citizenship and Immigration Services, or the actual number of workers who arrive in the United States in H-2A status. The countries included in the chart below are selected as the top users in Fiscal Year 2014. In addition to the top users of Fiscal Year 2014, Thailand and Haiti are included because they used to be bigger users of the program in past years. Note that the Eligible Countries List became active starting January 2009, so Haiti and Thailand had a dip in their usage between the time the list became active and the time they were added to the list.

As can be seen from the data below, Mexico has consistently accounted for over 90% of the use of the H-2A visa. Currently, the other source countries for H-2A visa holders are mostly from the Americas, in regions physically close to the United States. The biggest user from the African continent is South Africa (accounting for over 90% of usage from Africa) and the biggest user from Europe is Romania (accounting for about half of the usage from Europe). Also, whereas Mexico and Peru have been consistently strong users of the program since 1997 (when records started being kept), the usage by other countries has started more recently.

Fiscal Year	Total number of H-2A visas	Mexico	South Africa	Guatemala	Peru	Honduras	Nicaragua (became eligible in 2010)	Romania	Thailand (became eligible in 2014)	Haiti (became eligible in 2012 and became ineligible again in 2018)
1997	16,011	15,335	0	0	349	0	2	0	0	0
1998	22,676	21,969	6	0	378	7	0	0	0	0
1999	28,568	27,293	173	5	468	12	11	0	0	0
2000	30,201	28,442	551	93	407	6	21	0	2	0
2001	31,523	29,273	971	4	458	5	27	1	3	4
2002	31,538	29,006	1,209	0	466	1	27	0	3	0
2003	29,882	27,117	1,323	17	480	4	63	1	110	3
2004	31,774	28,683	1,326	39	614	3	114	368	339	3
2005	31,892	28,563	1,247	87	687	15	130	150	374	5
2006	37,149	34,195	1,054	110	841	3	146	87	11	78
2007	50,791	47,399	1,159	179	900	21	166	157	10	110
2008	64,404	59,669	1,375	534	887	21	225	242	32	558
2009	60,112	55,693	1,234	807	910	8	128	166	11	296
2010	55,921	52,317	1,123	660	830	20	194	206	11	0
2011	55,384	51,927	1,018	624	809	20	240	165	9	0
2012	65,345	61,324	1,122	702	993	33	260	185	11	58
2013	74,192	69,787	1,298	982	361	173	276	164	7	14
2014	89,274	83,674	1,591	1,453	790	525	318	195	15	15
2015	108,144	102,174	1,947	1,426	1,019	193	363	190	17	50
2016	134,368	123,231	2,335	1,680	874	400	388	202	25	65
2017	161,583	147,272	2,800	3,451	942	415	445	216	29	64
2018	196,409	180,420	3,562	3,936	946	334	483	249	36	1
2019	204,801	188,758	4,816	2,537	974	306	593	236	32	0
2020	213,394	197,908	5,508	2,123	536	299	693	224	4	0

=== Number of petitions approved by USCIS broken down by quarter and state ===
Since Fiscal Year 2012, the USCIS has released data on the number of H-2A petitions (Forms I-129) received, approved, and denied, broken down by quarter, U.S. state, and employer. Note the following caveats:

- Years and quarters use the United States fiscal year, that starts on October 1 of the previous calendar year and ends on September 30 of the calendar year. For instance, 2012 Q1 starts on October 1, 2011, and ends on December 31, 2011.
- Since a single H-2A petition can be filed for multiple workers, the number of approved petitions is substantially less than the number of workers who were approved.
- The quarter in which a petition is received may not be the same as the quarter in which it is approved. Similarly, the quarter in which a petition is approved may not be the same as the quarter in which a visa based on the petition is issued (however, the process is likely to span at most two adjacent quarters, due to the expedition of processing for H-2A petitions and the fact that a petition cannot be filed more than 75 days before the start date).

Variation based on the quarter and state reflects seasonal and geographical differences in demand for agricultural labor. In FY 2017, more than half of all H-2A positioned were certified to work-sites in just five states: North Carolina, Washington (state), Florida, Georgia (U.S. state), and California.

Data for some quarters is included below.

State	2012Q1	2012Q2	2012Q3	2012Q4	2013Q1	2013Q2	2013Q3	2013Q4
Alabama	7	7	5	3	5	6	2	4
Alaska	0	1	0	0	0	1	0	0
Arizona	3	5	5	3	8	3	9	1
Arkansas	6	74	30	5	16	59	26	8
California	17	11	13	7	12	22	22	17
Colorado	27	77	30	8	29	54	33	11
Connecticut	0	1	4	0	0	0	1	0
Delaware	1	1	1	1	1	1	1	2
District of Columbia	0	1	0	0	0	0	0	0
Florida	59	19	45	22	65	23	47	58
Georgia	14	29	48	30	31	100	56	72
Hawaii	3	1	0	0	1	0	0	1
Idaho	12	388	77	21	8	380	127	24
Illinois	0	10	9	2	0	5	2	2
Indiana	2	2	2	1	0	3	0	0
Iowa	5	9	17	6	15	11	28	52
Kansas	22	57	40	13	17	44	25	7
Kentucky	4	146	591	178	16	194	500	322
Louisiana	110	250	147	70	175	238	84	90
Maine	5	4	27	5	3	2	23	3
Maryland	1	33	11	3	3	24	6	4
Massachusetts	0	2	0	1	0	2	0	0
Michigan	0	8	3	0	0	3	1	1
Minnesota	7	39	31	11	8	38	22	12
Mississippi	4	35	18	9	16	24	16	13
Missouri	2	41	11	2	5	50	9	3
Montana	3	8	6	3	2	13	7	4
Nebraska	5	10	9	1	5	9	9	4
Nevada	1	7	14	8	5	6	5	7
New Hampshire	0	58	168	86	7	75	113	126
New Jersey	0	16	5	0	0	17	3	0
New Mexico	4	10	4	2	2	9	6	0
New York	8	97	86	61	4	91	52	78
North Carolina	103	262	267	81	101	288	227	125
North Dakota	11	85	58	21	13	92	67	31
Ohio	0	17	9	0	0	7	0	1
Oklahoma	17	52	45	22	18	61	42	29
Oregon	0	1	3	2	1	2	1	1
Pennsylvania	0	29	0	4	0	14	9	4
Rhode Island	0	0	0	0	0	0	0	0
South Carolina	1	13	4	1	4	9	5	0
South Dakota	21	34	31	15	14	33	29	19
Tennessee	1	29	81	20	1	28	27	11
Texas	29	145	91	42	42	142	78	58
Utah	211	232	161	157	138	340	130	189
Vermont	1	11	23	17	4	15	24	30
Virginia	1	25	23	17	16	124	60	30
Washington	11	4	21	12	3	7	25	41
West Virginia	0	1	0	0	0	1	0	0
Wisconsin	0	3	0	0	0	1	0	0
Wyoming	107	218	119	82	130	178	110	85
Not reported by state	1	1	17	0	0	2	10	0
Total	847	2619	2435		945	2851	2079	1580

== See also ==
- Bracero Program
- Guest worker program
- H-2B visa
- Operation Blooming Onion
