= Genomic selection =

Genomic Selection (GS) predicts the breeding values of an offspring in a population by associating their traits (e.g. resistance to pests) with their high-density genetic marker scores. GS is a method proposed to address deficiencies of marker-assisted selection (MAS) in breeding programs. However, GS is a form of MAS that differs from it by estimating, at the same time, all genetic markers, haplotypes or marker effects along the entire genome to calculate the values of genomic estimated breeding values (GEBV). The potentiality of GS is to explain the genetic diversity of a breeding program through a high coverage of genome-wide markers and to assess the effects of those markers to predict breeding values.

== MAS limitations ==
In contrast to MAS and its focus on a few significant markers, GS examines together all markers in a population. Since the initial proposal of GS for application in breeding populations, it has been emerging as a solution to the deficiencies of MAS.

The MAS has presented two main limitations in breeding applications. First, the bi-parental mapping populations are used for most QTL analyses, limiting their accuracy. This represents a problem because a single bi-parental population cannot represent allelic diversity and genetic background effects in a breeding population.

Furthermore, polygenic traits (or complex traits) controlled by several small-effects markers have been an incredible hassle for MAS. The statistical methods applied for identifying target markers and implementing MAS for improvement of polygenic traits have been unsuccessful.
