= USCIS immigration forms =

The United States Citizenship and Immigration Services (USCIS) issues a number of forms for people to submit to them relating to immigrant and non-immigrant visa statuses. These forms begin with the letter "I". None of the forms directly grants a United States visa (visas can only be issued by US consulates outside the United States), but approval of these forms may provide authorization for staying or extending one's stay in the United States as well as authorization for work. Some United States visas require an associated approved USCIS immigration form to be submitted as part of the application.

Although the term immigration form is used on this page, and the forms begin with the letter "I", many of the forms pertain to non-immigrant visa classifications.

The USCIS also issues some administrative request forms (AR) for purposes such as address change as well as G forms for other administrative purposes. The AR and G forms are generally filed in conjunction with a USCIS I form. The two most important G forms are the G-28 (notice of entry or appearance of attorney) and the G-1145 (e-notification of application/petition acceptance).

The USCIS also handles forms related to naturalization and citizenship. These forms begin with the letter "N" and are not discussed on this page.

There are two main forms that begin with the letter I and pertain to immigration status but are not managed by USCIS: Form I-20 (issued by educational institutions to students on a F visa status) and Form I-94 (issued by United States Customs and Border Protection when an alien enters the United States).

== Filing details ==
=== Fees ===
All USCIS forms are free to download. The filing fees vary by form, from free to several hundred dollars.

The filing fee for a form may not be the only fee that needs to be paid for the status being sought on the form. There may be additional fees associated with that status. For instance, Form I-129 is used to apply for H-1B status (among many other statuses); there are several additional fees associated with H-1B status.

Two of the forms, Form I-129 and Form I-140, are eligible for the Premium Processing Service, which requires the filing of Form I-907. As of April 2025, this services costs $1,685 for the H-2B and R classifications and $2,805 for all others.

Some applicants are eligible for a fee waiver. To apply for a fee waiver, the applicant must submit Form I-912, Request for a Fee Waiver, along with the application form.

Fees paid for USCIS immigration forms are deposited in the Immigration Examinations Fee Account (IEFA) managed by the United States Treasury; this account funds most of the USCIS budget.

=== Paper filing ===
All USCIS forms can be filed on paper. Payments must be included in the form of a check or money order along with the paper filing of the form.

The rules associated with where forms are to be mailed are complex: the location for mailing a form depends on the form name, the category of application, and the mailing address specified by the applicant (this may differ from the address the applicant sends the application from). The mailing address is either one of the lockbox addresses or one of the Service Center addresses. The lockboxes are in three US cities: Chicago (Illinois), Phoenix (Arizona), and Lewisville (Texas) (this is near Dallas, Texas and is often referred to as the Dallas lockbox). They are managed for the USCIS by a Department of Treasury designated financial agent. The lockbox cashes in on the included payment, sends an e-notification if the applicant filed Form G-1145 with the application, and forwards the rest of the application to the service center.

Any response to a Request For Evidence (RFE) or Notice of Intent to Deny (NOID) must always be sent to the Service Center that sent the request, and never to a lockbox address, regardless of whether or not the original application was filed with a lockbox.

=== Electronic filing ===
Some of the USCIS forms may be filed electronically via e-Filing (for Forms I-131, I-140, I-765, I-821, and I-907) or the USCIS Electronic Immigration System (USCIS ELIS) (for Forms I-526, I-539, I-90, or the Immigrant Fee).

Electronic filing offers the following benefits:

- It reduces the hassle and cost of filing a paper application (but see the caveat below).
- Fees may be paid by debit card or credit card.
- The applicant receives an immediate confirmation of receipt of the application.

However, there are two major caveats:

- Supporting documents must be sent in by mail within 7 days of online filing, to the address specified on the e-Filing Confirmation Receipt. USCIS does not begin processing the application until all supporting documents are received. If they are not received then USCIS may send the applicant a request for evidence (RFE).
- If the applicant is requesting a fee waiver (filing Form I-912) then the application cannot be submitted online and must be filed on paper.

To enhance privacy and security for applicants, USCIS uses the HTTPS protocol for e-filing.

== Forms ==
The two main kinds of forms are:

- Petition forms: Filed by a petitioner requesting a benefit (immigrant or non-immigrant) for a beneficiary, who is usually a different person, though some self-petition options exist. These forms often carry the most uncertainty regarding approval and may be subject to quotas.
- Application forms: Related to entry to or exit from the United States, or work authorization. These benefits are generally governed by clearer rules and involve less uncertainty than petition forms.

In addition, there are affidavits (e.g., Form I-134, Affidavit of Support), verification forms (Form I-9, Employee Eligibility Verification Form), and request forms such as Form I-907, Request for Premium Processing Service.

=== Family-based petition forms ===
Form name	Who needs to file? (relationship between petitioner and beneficiary)	Filing fee	Filed to lockbox or service center?	Electronic filing?	Associated visa or immigration statuses
I-129F, Petition for Alien Fiancé(e)	United States citizen seeking to bring the alien fiancé(e) to the United States	$675	Lockbox	No	K visas
I-130, Petition for Alien Relative	United States citizen or lawful permanent resident seeking to petition an eligible family member who will immigrate to the US	$675 (paper) $625 (online) || Lockbox || Yes || Family-based immigration (includes IR and CR visas); Note: This form is eligible for Direct Consular Filing
I-600, Petition to Classify Orphan as an Immediate Relative (also related: I-600A, Application for Advance Processing of an Orphan Petition)	United States citizen who seeks to classify non-US orphan not residing in a Hague Convention country as immediate relative	$775 per child, unless adoptees are birth siblings	Dallas Lockbox	No	Family-based permanent immigration Note: This form is eligible for Direct Consular Filing
I-730, Refugee/Asylee Relative Petition	Refugee/asylee already in the United States requesting follow-to-join benefits for an immediate relative	No fee	Service Center	No	Family-based immigration
I-800, Petition to Classify Convention Adoptee as an Immediate Relative (filed in conjunction with I-800A), Application for Determination of Suitability to Adopt a Child from a Convention Country	United States citizen prospective adoptive parent who seeks to classify as adoptee a resident of a Hague Convention country	No fee for first petition based on an approved I-800A (which in turn has a $775 fee). Each subsequent petition costs $775, unless the new petition is on behalf of a sibling of a previously petitioned child.	Dallas Lockbox	No	Family-based permanent immigration
I-929, Petition for Qualifying Family Member of a U-1 Nonimmigrant	U visa non-immigrant requesting non-immigrant status for a family member	$230	Vermont Service Center	No	Family-based temporary migration (i.e., non-immigrant status)

=== Other petition forms (employment-based, entrepreneurial, and special) ===
Form name	Who needs to file? (relationship between petitioner and beneficiary)	Filing fee	Filed to lockbox or service center?	Electronic filing?	Associated visa or immigration statuses
I-129, Petition for a Non-immigrant Worker	Employer requesting permission to hire the beneficiary non-immigrant worker	$460	Service center	No	Statuses for initial employment: H-1B, H-1C, H-2A, H-2B, H-3, L-1, O-1, O-2, P-1, P-1S, P-2, P-2S, P-3, P-3S, Q-1 and R-1. Statuses for extension of stay or change of status: All the preceding, plus various treaty and free trade statuses: E-1, E-2, E-3 (for Australia), H-1B1 (for Chile and Singapore) and TN (for Canada and Mexico). Note: This form is eligible for Premium Processing Service
I-140, Immigrant Petition for Alien Worker	United States employer requesting permission to hire the beneficiary immigrant worker	$700	Lockbox for regular processing, Service Center for premium processing	Yes, via e-Filing (for some categories)	Employment-based visas (EB-1, EB-2, EB-3) (with path to Lawful Permanent Resident status). Note: This form is eligible for Premium Processing Service
I-360, Petition for Amerasian, Widow(er), or Special Immigrant	Beneficiary must self-petition	$435 (special instructions)	Lockbox or Service Center, depending on the subcategory	No	Permanent immigration status (depends on subcategory within I-360). Note: This form is eligible for Direct Consular Filing
I-526, Immigrant Petition by Alien Entrepreneur	Beneficiary must self-petition	$3675	Dallas Lockbox	Yes, via ELIS	EB-5 visa (with path to Lawful Permanent Resident status)
I-829, Petition by Entrepreneur to Remove Conditions on Permanent Resident Status	Beneficiary must self-petition	$3750 (+ biometric services fee of $85)	Dallas Lockbox	Yes, via ELIS	EB-5 visa (with path to Lawful Permanent Resident status)
I-918, Petition for U Nonimmigrant Status	Beneficiary must self-petition	No fee (biometric services may be required at no cost to the applicant)	Vermont Service Center	No	U visa

=== Application forms ===
There are many application forms. Only the most important ones are listed below.

Form name	Who needs to file?	Filing fee	Filed to lockbox or service center?	Electronic filing?	Associated visa or immigration statuses
I-131, Application for Travel Document	Applicant for re-entry permit, refugee travel document or advance parole travel document	Depends on type of applicant. Fee values include $105, $135, and $575. For I-485 applicants, online filing is $580 and paper filing is $630.	Lockbox or Service Center, depending on the category	Yes, via e-filing, but only for those applying for advance parole, not for those whose application is based on an approved request for consideration of deferred action for childhood arrivals (Form I-821D).	Humanitarian/refugee statuses and DACA/DAPA-associated statuses.
I-539, Application To Extend/Change Nonimmigrant Status	Applicants seeking to change, extend, or reinstate status. Note that this form need not be filed by those whose Form I-94 says "Duration of Status" and who are extending within the status provided by the form (for instance, somebody on a F visa with Duration of Status can simply extend the end date on the Form I-20 and need not submit Form I-539). It is also not to be submitted by those using Form I-129 to change or extend status.	$370 ($0 for some categories)	Lockbox or Service Center, depending on the category	Yes, via ELIS (for some categories)	Eligible for ELIS: Extend status for B-1, B-2, F-1, M-1 or M-2 visas; change status to B-1, B-2, F-1, F-2, J-1, J-2, M-1 or M-2; reinstate status to F-1 or M-1; Other applications, such as T, U, and V status extensions, need to be made on paper.
I-765, Application for Employment Authorization	Applicant seeking permission to work.	$410; DACA applicants need an additional $85 biometrics fee. For I-485 applicants filed after April 1, 2024, the fee is $260 (both online and paper filing).	Lockbox for most categories, Service Center for some	Yes, via e-filing (for some categories)	A number of statuses, including DACA-associated statuses as well as F visa (student) statuses applying for Optional Practical Training or Curricular Practical Training
I-821, Application for Temporary Protected Status	Applicant seeking Temporary Protected Status	$50 or $0; however, it must be filed along with Form I-765, which has a fee of $410	Complicated	Yes, via e-filing, but only for re-registration, and if so, Form I-765 must be filed online along with it	All applicants for TPS
I-821D, Consideration of Deferred Action for Childhood Arrivals	Applicant seeking deferred action under the Deferred Action for Childhood Arrivals program	Must be filed with Form I-765, which has a filing fee of $410; also an $85 biometrics fee. No separate fee for I-821D	Lockbox	No	All applicants for Deferred Action for Childhood Arrivals

=== Appeal forms ===
These are the forms that need to be filed to appeal a decision by a USCIS officer regarding another form. The appeal form must be filed by the party that filed the original form. In particular, in the case of a petition, the appeal must be filed by the petitioner and cannot be filed by the beneficiary (if distinct from the petitioner). Appeals are handled by the Board of Immigration Appeals within the Executive Office for Immigration Review (part of the Department of Justice) and the Administrative Appeals Office within the USCIS. BIA's main role is for challenges to U.S. Immigration and Customs Enforcement decisions, but it is also used to appeal some USCIS forms.

Form name	Whom is the appeal forwarded to?	What forms can this be filed for?
EOIR-29, Notice of Appeal to the Board of Immigration Appeals from a Decision of an Immigration Officer	Board of Immigration Appeals	Form I-130 and the subtype of Form I-360 that is for widowers.
I-290B, Notice of Appeal or Motion	Administrative Appeals Office	Most employment-based immigrant and nonimmigrant visa petitions (Forms I-129 and I-140); I-526, I-821, I-129F, I-601, I-212, I-360, I-600, I-600A, I-914, I-918, N-470

Of the USCIS immigration forms, decisions on the two forms Form I-130 (family-based immigration, the F and IR categories) and the widower subcategory for Form I-360 (special immigrants, the EB-4 category), must be appealed through the EOIR-29 (Notice of Appeal to the Board of Immigration Appeals from a Decision of an Immigration Officer) to the Board of Immigration Appeals. Also, appeals for denials of Form N-400 (the naturalization petition) must be made using Form N-336. For Special Agricultural Worker (SAW) or legalization applications, the appeal must be filed on Form I-694, Notice of Appeal of Decision under Sections 245A or 210 of the Immigration and Nationality Act.

For all other USCIS petitions where appeal is possible, the petitioner can appeal an adverse USCIS decision on the petition to the AAO using Form I-290B, Notice of Appeal or Motion.

As of December 2016, appeal to AAO is possible for the following petition forms: I-129 (nonimmigrant worker), I-140 (immigrant worker), I-526 (immigrant investor), Form I-821, I-129F, I-601, I-212, I-360, I-600, I-600A, I-914, I-918, N-470. As of December 2016, there are no appeal rights for Form I-485 (Adjustment of Status)

There is no standalone appeals process for Form I-765.

The form is usually applied for in conjunction with another form that grants the underlying authorization, and a denial of the other form can be appealed.

=== Form I-797 ===
Form I-797 is a form used by the USCIS to issue approval of status or notice of receipt for applications. It is not a form that people can fill out.

== Form-filling guidelines ==
The USCIS website includes a number of tips for people filing USCIS forms, including suggestions to download the latest version from the website, use black ink, and start with a clean form in case of errors. All supporting documents must be included in the application, and documents not in English must include a certified English translation.

Law resource NOLO emphasizes the importance of filling in all fields, even if it's filled with "N/A", and being accurate and consistent. NOLO also places emphasis on getting one's name correct.

=== Translated Document Requirements ===
USCIS requires all non-English documents to be accompanied by a certified translation. A certified translation by official USCIS standard is a translation that follows the following guidelines:

1. The translation is done word-for-word and not paraphrasing.
2. The translator signs a written statement declaring that the translation is complete and accurate.
3. The translator signs a written statement that the translator competent to translate from the foreign language into English.
4. The translator may be called to testify to the completion and accuracy of the translation, not just their linguistic capability.

=== Translation Notes ===
If you are planning to have a certified translation done for use by USCIS, it's important for the translator to leave their email and phone number in case of any mistranslations, as USCIS will contact them if the translation is deemed incorrect, incomplete, or insufficient. While anyone fluent in both languages may provide translations, USCIS often scrutinizes self-translations or those from relatives due to potential conflicts of interest, which can lead to delays or a Request for Evidence (RFE). Applicants frequently mitigate this risk by using professional providers such as TransPerfect, TheWordPoint, or Lionbridge.

== See also ==
- Direct Consular Filing
- Premium Processing Service
