= Family visa =

Category of immigration authorization

A family visa is a category of immigration authorization issued by a country's government that allows foreign nationals to join family members who are citizens or legal residents of that country. The primary purpose of these visas is to promote family unity, enabling spouses, partners, children, parents, and other eligible relatives to live together.

== Germany ==
The Familienzusammenführung visa was created to allow family members (primarily children and spouses) of foreigners already living in Germany. to reside together as a family unit. To be eligible for a German Family Reunification Visa, the applicant already living in Germany has to be a legal resident of the country. This can be achieved by obtaining a Blue Card or a Residence permit. To apply for this type of visa, the applicant can report to the German embassy or consulate in their home country. The required documents are Residence Permit Application Form and Declaration of Accuracy of Information.

For spouses applying for the visa, Germany requires the marriage certificate of the couple, proof of basic German language skills, a copy of the spouse's passport (if they are an EU citizen) or residency permit (if they are not an EU citizen).

For minors Germany requires a letter of consent from their parents, their birth certificate, and copies of both parents' passports. Depending on circumstances, applicants may also need proof of adoption, a custody decree (in case of divorced parents), or a parent's death certificate. The child also cannot be married, divorced, or widowed and has to be under 18 years of age.

=== Updates for 2025 ===
As of 2025, Germany has further streamlined its immigration process. Many German missions abroad have transitioned to a more digitized application process, allowing for online submission of documents before the in-person appointment. Additionally, under the new Opportunity Card (Chancenkarte) program, relatives of skilled workers can also apply for family reunification, provided they can secure their livelihood without relying on public funds.

== United States ==
Immediate relatives of US citizens can become legal residents of the United States by getting a green card if they meet the eligibility requirements. The United States defines immediate relatives of an American citizen as their spouse, unmarried children under 21-year of age, and their parents, provided the citizen is at least 21 years old.

The application process starts by filling out Form I-130, Petition for Alien Relative, and after U.S. Citizenship and Immigration Services (USCIS) approves the petition, the foreign family member may apply for a green card. The green card application can be filed through the U.S. embassy or consulate in the applicant's home country. Applicants who are already in the U.S. can fill out an online form available on the U.S. government website to adjust their status without leaving the country.

Family members trying to get this type of visa cannot qualify as a secondary benefit based on the application of their immediate relative, they have to file their application independently.

=== Requirements for this type of visa ===
- The applicant must be petitioned by their US citizen relative
- The relative relationship between the applicant and their US citizen family member has to be documented
- The US citizen has to promise to financially sponsor their relative
- The applying relative must be admissible to the US

The visas for immediate relatives are always available, as there is an unlimited amount of them.

=== Updates for 2025 ===
A significant development affecting applicants in 2025 is the substantial increase in immigration fees implemented by USCIS in 2024. The new fee structure raised the cost for key family-based petitions, including Form I-130, adding a considerable financial component to the application process. Alongside the higher costs, applicants continue to face significant processing backlogs. While USCIS and the National Visa Center (NVC) are implementing measures to reduce wait times, delays remain a critical factor. All petitioners must also sign an Affidavit of Support (Form I-864), guaranteeing they will financially support the intending immigrant.

== Australia ==
The Australian sponsored family stream visa is a type of Australian visitor visa (Subclass 600) designed to facilitate family reunification by enabling Australian citizens and permanent residents to sponsor their family members for a visit to Australia. The person applying for this visa has to be outside Australia at the time of their application and has to wait while the Australian Department of Home Affairs (DOHA) decides on the application. This visa is not for the purpose of business or medical treatment, but it allows the applicant to study there for up to 3 months in total.

Eligible family members who may apply include parents and grandparents, children and grandchildren, partners or spouses, siblings, aunts and uncles, and nieces and nephews. The sponsorship can be extended to family members of the sponsored relatives; for example, the Australian citizen can sponsor the spouse of their brother or sister. Excluded relationships include fiancés or fiancées, In-laws, cousins, friends, and citizens of New Zealand

Each applicant must have a sponsor, who is an Australian citizen or permanent resident over the age of 18 who is either a direct relative of the visa applicant, a relative of someone in the applicant's family, or a relative of a person in the applicant's family, where that person is applying for a visa.

Other criteria for the visa include:

- DOHA may require the sponsor to provide a financial security bond
- The applicant must be outside of Australia when they apply and when the decision is made
- The applicant must meet health requirements set by DOHA
- The applicant must meet the character requirements disclosed in Australian immigration policies
- Applicant's debts to the Australian government must be cleared
- The applicant must have access to enough financial resources to support themselves during their visit
- The visit must be temporary and all stay conditions and periods must be respected

Other notable Australian visa types that allow moving to Australia to live with one's family include Adoption visa (subclass 102), Child visa (subclass 101), Dependent Child visa (subclass 445), Orphan Relative (subclass 117), Parent visa (subclass 103), and Partner visa (subclass 820 801).

=== Updates for 2025 ===
The demand for Parent visas (subclass 103) remains extremely high, with very long processing times. To manage the queue, the government is using a Parent visa ballot for the 2024-2025 program year for certain categories and continues to promote the Sponsored Parent (Temporary) visa (subclass 870) as a faster alternative. The Department of Home Affairs also continues to prioritize Partner visa applications to ensure quicker processing for spouses and partners.

== United Kingdom ==
The UK Family Visa was designed for those who want to establish life with their family members who are already residents or citizens of the United Kingdom.

Eligible family members include:

- A spouse or partner of a UK resident
- A child of a UK resident
- A relative in need for long-time care of a UK resident
- A parent of a UK resident
- A separated partner or spouse
- A widow or widower of a former UK resident

Eligibility requirements differ based on the relationship of the applicant to the UK resident.

It is not possible to obtain a UK Family Visa while already living in the United Kingdom with a UK visitor visa with a validity period of 6 months or less, but this rule does not apply to a UK visitor marriage visa. Being on a temporary student visa or work visa also makes one ineligible for a UK Family Visa.

=== Updates for 2025 ===
Significant policy changes were implemented leading into 2025. The minimum income requirement for sponsoring a partner/spouse was substantially increased to £18,600 to £29,000 as of April 11, 2024, with further phased increases planned. Furthermore, the Immigration Health Surcharge (IHS), a mandatory fee to access the National Health Service (NHS), also increased significantly, adding to the overall cost of application. The application process is detailed, requiring specific evidence to meet these strict criteria, often leading applicants to seek professional legal guidance.

=== Types of the UK Family Visas ===
- Spouse visa
  - Available to those who want to join their partner or spouse who is a UK resident, a refugee, or a settled person.
  - In the case of the death of a person settled in the UK, their partner may be eligible to apply for settlement, which is indefinite leave to remain in the UK. It gives the right to work, study, and live in the country. It is required that the person applying for settlement has been staying in the UK with their partner on the basis of a family visa for spouses.
- Parent visa
  - Applicants must be a parent of a UK citizen or a parent of a person who spent a minimum of 7 continuous years in the UK.
- Child visa
  - The child visa allows a child to stay in the United Kingdom for a specific period of time. It is designed for children who are not UK citizens or residents and who wish to join their parents or legal guardians living in the United Kingdom.
- Adult Dependent Relative Visa
  - It is a visa type designed for adults in need of care by their relative who is a UK citizen, a person settled in the UK, or a refugee. To be eligible for this type of visa, the relative in need of care has to be at least 18 years old, and their relative settled in the UK must have enough money to be in a position to provide care and support for at least 5 years.
- Visa as a separated or divorced dependent partner
  - A type of visa designed for those who were staying in the UK on a family visa as spouses or as a dependant of one's partner visa and got divorced. When that happens, one must inform the Home Office and then apply to stay in the United Kingdom or leave the country.
