= Administrative Appeals Office =

US Citizenship and Immigration Services office

The Administrative Appeals Office, full name USCIS Administrative Appeals Office, and also known as the AAO and USCIS AAO, is an office within United States Citizenship and Immigration Services (USCIS) that can be used by petitioners to appeal adverse USCIS decisions made on their petitions. It is located in Washington, D.C., and all its in-person functions (including listening to oral arguments) happen only in Washington, D.C.

== Appeals process ==
=== Three uses of Form I-290B ===
Most appeals must be filed on Form I-290B (with a fee) within 30 days of the initial denial. The USCIS office that denied the benefit will review the appeal and determine whether to take favorable action and grant the benefit request. If that office does not take favorable action, it will forward the appeal to the AAO for appellate review.

Form I-290B, Notice of Appeal or Motion, can be used for three purposes:

1. To file an appeal with the AAO
2. To file a motion to reconsider a decision
3. To file a motion to reopen a decision

The key difference between appeals and motions is that appeals go to the AAO, i.e., a higher authority than the one that made the decision being appealed. Also, they do not need to include additional evidence, since the underlying claim of the appeal is that the office whose decision is being appealed did not correctly process the existing evidence.

In contrast, motions to reconsider or reopen apply to the same office that made the decision being appealed. In particular, a motion to reconsider or reopen a denial by a service center will be made to that service center. Motions to reconsider/reopen must be accompanied by new evidence showing that the initially filed petition should have been approved.

To complicate matters, it is possible to file a motion to reconsider or reopen AAO's decision in response to a past appeal.

=== Adjudication (or readjudication) that must be completed before an appeal can be made ===
An appeal can be made about a petition only after the USCIS officer adjudicating or re-adjudicating the petition has finished adjudicating, and only if the petition was denied (for initial adjudication) or revoked (for re-adjudication).

There are two steps that the USCIS might take in order to help petitioners voice their concerns during adjudication, to reduce the need for appeals:

- Request For Evidence (RFE): Here, the USCIS requests the petitioner for additional evidence while the form is still being adjudicated. It is intended for use in cases where the adjudicator (the person evaluating the petition) believes that there is not enough evidence to approve the petition, but also believes that the petition may be redeemable, and that there is no clear factual or statutory basis for denial.
- Notice of Intent to Deny (NOID): Here, the USCIS sends the petitioner a notice explaining that a denial is likely, along with reasons for denial. The petitioner has some time to send additional evidence that could help change the decision. The NOID is used for situations where the adjudicator (the person evaluating the petition) believes that the petition should be denied, but that the petitioner may have additional evidence that might lead the petition to be approved.

In some cases, petitions that were initially approved are readjudicated after a consular officer processing a visa based on the approved petition finds a reason that the petition should not have been approved or is no longer approvable. The USCIS may decide, based on the readjudication, to revoke the petition. During this readjudication process, the USCIS may issue a Notice of Intent to Revoke (NOIR) that plays a similar role as the NOID does for initial adjudication.

if a denial or revocation is sent, it includes information on whether an appeal is allowed. If no appeal is allowed, then the only option available for challenge is filing a motion to reconsider or reopen.

=== Submission of appeal ===
The following restrictions apply on using Form I-290B to file appeals:

- The appeal must be filed by the petitioner. The beneficiary cannot appeal a USCIS decision. This is relevant to forms such as Form I-129, Form I-130, and Form I-140, where, in most cases, the beneficiary differs from the petitioner. For instance, with Form I-130, a US citizen wife might file a petition for her non-US-citizen husband. In this case, only the wife can appeal a denial, not the husband.
- The appeal must be filed within a specific time limit after the adverse decision. The limits are:
  - 30 calendar days for denials served in person
  - 33 calendar days for denials served by mail
  - 15 calendar days for revocations served in person
  - 18 calendar days for revocations served by mail

An appeal that is filed late is automatically treated as a motion to reconsider or reopen, if it otherwise meets the criteria for those. Although the motion to reconsider or reopen also has the same time limits, there is a little more flexibility allowed for late filing of motions.

Appeals may be accompanied by briefs in support of the appeal. The briefs can be submitted at the time of initial filing of the appeal or within 30 days.

The appellant can also request an oral argument before the AAO in Washington, D.C. Oral arguments are not always granted. Interpreters are not provided for oral arguments.

Appellants may also request expedited processing of the AAO, but only by providing evidence of one or more of these:

- Severe financial loss to a company or individual;
- Extreme emergent situation;
- Humanitarian situation;
- Nonprofit status of requesting organization in furthering the cultural and social interests of the United States;
- Department of Defense or National Interest Situation (Note: The request must come from an official United States Government entity and must state that a delay will be detrimental to the Government);
- Handling error by USCIS that has created an unreasonable delay that may be corrected by placing the case back in its original order; and
- Compelling interest of USCIS.

=== Initial field review (IFR) ===
If the petitioner files Form I-290B, Notice of Appeal or Motion, the appeal is first sent to the office that adjudicated the original petition. This gives the office the opportunity to review the appeal and readjudicate the petition if necessary. This stage is called initial field review or IFR.

If the office finds no problem with the denial or revocation, then the appeal is forwarded to the AAO, entering the stage called appellate review.

The initial field review should be completed within 45 days.

The defining guidelines for IFR were issued in a November 2015 policy memorandum.

=== Appellate review ===
After initial field review, the appeal is processed by AAO, using the original petition, the decision of the USCIS field office, and any briefs or oral arguments presented as part of the appeal. The AAO will then come to one of three decisions:

- Sustain (approve) the appeal, thus overturning the original denial or revocation.
- Dismiss (deny) the appeal, thus maintaining the original denial or revocation.
- Remand (return) the appeal, thus making the original office review the petition yet again.

The appellate review should be completed within six months (180 days) of receiving the appeal (note that this includes the time spent on initial field review). Like the rest of USCIS, the AAO releases processing time goals for appeals based on form type. Current AAO processing times are not included in USCIS' monthly report of processing times across its field offices and service centers, but rather, the fraction of appeals for each category for which processing time goals were met in the most recent quarter is included on the AAO processing times page.

=== Records ===
It is possible to get a copy of the notice of record for an appeal made to AAO by submitting a Freedom of Information Act request to USCIS. However, this is not part of the appeal timeline, so an appellant cannot use delay in processing of the FOIA to explain delay in submitting any necessary documents. The FOIA can be made by anybody (not necessarily the petitioner or beneficiary); however, key identifying information, including the petitioner's and beneficiary's name, are often redacted.

=== Steps if the appeal is denied ===
If an appeal to AAO is denied, the appellant can file a motion to reconsider or reopen if there is new evidence that would show that the appeal should have been sustained.

Otherwise, the AAO's decision can be appealed within the United States federal judicial system.

== Decision framework and impact on USCIS and judicial review ==
The significance of precedent and non-precedent decisions, as well as the concept of adopted decisions, as detailed below, have been evolving slowly since 2003. The most recent defining memorandum explaining the distinction was issued by the USCIS in November 2013. This is part of a general thrust in the AAO to move toward clearer and more consistent rulemaking to improve decision quality and consistency.

=== Non-precedent decisions ===
Most AAO decisions are non-precedent decisions: they apply existing law and policy to the facts of the case. Non-precedent decisions are binding on the parties involved, but have no effect on agency guidance or practice. AAO has all its non-precedent decisions since 2005 available in an online repository. Decisions before 2005 can be obtained using Freedom of Information Act (FOIA) requests. The name of the petitioner and beneficiary are usually redacted in the non-precedent decisions available online.

=== Adopted decisions ===
Non-precedent decisions by AAO are sometimes adopted by USCIS as binding policy guidance for USCIS personnel. An adopted decision may later get superseded by other USCIS policy changes.

=== Precedent decisions ===
Some AAO decisions acquire the status of precedent decisions. This means they become legally binding on all DHS components that deal with the law. Precedent decisions therefore carry more force than adopted decisions, which in turn carry more force than other non-precedent decisions.

Precedent decisions may be modified or overruled by:

- The Attorney General
- Federal Courts
- Later precedent decisions
- Changes in the law

Although not legally bound by them, federal courts generally give more deference to precedent decisions, and decisions using similar reasoning as precedent decisions, than to non-precedent decisions,

== Data sets ==
The AAO releases data on the number of appeals of each decision type (dismiss, sustain, remand) for each combination of USCIS form category and fiscal year.

== History ==
The Immigration and Naturalization Services (the historical agency that carried out functions currently carried out by USCIS, as well as some of the functions of ICE and CBP) created the Administrative Appeals Unit (AAU) in 1983.

Later, to deal with appeals for the legalization introduced as part of the Immigration Reform and Control Act of 1986, it created the Legalization Appeals Unit (LAU).

In 1994, the two units were combined into the Administrative Appeals Office (AAO). In 2003, the INS was dismantled and AAO was absorbed into the newly created United States Citizenship and Immigration Services (USCIS).

On November 18, 2013, USCIS issued a Policy Memorandum with guidance on the proper use of precedent and non-precedent decisions.

In January 2015, the first edition of the AAO Practice Manual was published and made available online.

On November 4, 2015, the USCIS issued a Policy Memorandum with updated guidance on how Form I-290B appeals would be processed by the USCIS, with a focus on explaining the timeline and process for initial field review.

In April 2016, AAO made its non-precedent decisions since 2005 publicly searchable. In 2024, a third party platform was developed to make it easier for the public to search for AAO cases by form type, service center, nationality, profession of the petitioner and nationality.

== See also ==
- Board of Immigration Appeals
