= Premium Processing Service =

Expedited USCIS service for select immigration forms

Premium Processing Service is an optional premium service offered by the United States Citizenship and Immigration Services to individuals and/or employers filing Form I-129 (Petition for a Nonimmigrant Worker), Form I-140 (Immigrant Petition for Alien Worker), Form I-539 (Application to Extend/Change Nonimmigrant Status- currently available to those applying for F, M or J status only) or Form I-765 petitions (only available to F-1 students applying for Optional Practical Training or STEM OPT extension). To avail of the service, the applicant (either an individual petitioner or an employer) needs to file Form I-907 and include a fee that (as of 2021) is $1,500 for the H-2B and R classifications and $2,500 for all others.

== Procedure and time frame ==
According to the United States Citizenship and Immigration Services website, USCIS guarantees 15 calendar-day processing to I-129 or I-140 petitioners (except National Interest Waiver applicants) who choose to use this service or USCIS will refund the Premium Processing Service fee. For F-1 students applying for initial OPT employment authorization or STEM OPT extension using form I-765, well as for those using form I-539 to change to F, M or J status, the guarantee is for 30 days. However, for I-140 petitioners applying for a National Interest Waiver, the guarantee is for 45 day processing.

If the fee is refunded, the relating case will continue to receive expedited processing. The time begins from the receipt of Form I-907 and the associated fee. Form I-907 may be filed along with Form I-129, I-140 or I-765, or electronically as a standalone form for a previously filed Form I-129 or I-140.

When the USCIS says it will process the application within 15 days (or 30/45 days for F-1 OPT/National Interest Waiver petitioners, respectively), this does not mean that a final decision about the application will be reached within that timeframe. Rather, the USCIS promises one of the following four responses:

1. Approval Notice
2. Request For Evidence (RFE): The USCIS asks the applicant to submit additional evidence or information.
3. Notice of Intent to Deny (NOID)
4. Commencing an investigation for fraud or misrepresentation.

If the USCIS issues a RFE or NOID, the applicant must file a timely response. The USCIS has an additional 15 days to process the application after receiving the applicant's response. Form I-907 need not be filed again, and the premium processing fee need not be paid again.

At present, the Premium Processing Service is available for all visa classes for which Forms I-129 and I-140 can be used, with the exception of Form I-129 filings that request a change or an initial grant of status for beneficiaries within the Commonwealth of Northern Mariana Islands (CNMI).

Applying for the Premium Processing Service does not provide any preferential treatment in the lottery for cap-subject visas such as the H-1B visa, H-2B visa, or H-3 visa.

USCIS' previous system of allowing discretionary expedite requests is no longer available for any task for which the Premium Processing Service is available, with one exception: non-profits (as designated by the Internal Revenue Service) may still make discretionary expedite requests instead of using the Premium Processing Service. Also, for categories for which Premium Processing has been temporarily suspended, discretionary expedite requests may be made and would be subject to the usual Expedite Criteria.

== History ==
=== Background ===
The general idea of the Premium Processing Service started taking shape in 1999 when Congress and private industry started putting pressure on the INS to process applications faster. Congress mandated that INS process L-1 petitions within 30 days.

On December 21, 2000, President Bill Clinton signed an amendment to the Immigration and Nationality Act that added the subsection:

The Attorney General is authorized to establish and collect a premium fee for employment-based petitions and applications. This fee shall be used to provide certain premium-processing services to business customers, and to make infrastructure improvements in the adjudications and customer service process. For approval of the benefit applied for, the petitioner/applicant must meet the legal criteria for such benefit. This fee shall be set at $1,000, shall be paid in addition to any normal petition/application fee that may be applicable, and shall be deposited as offsetting collections in the Immigration Examinations Fee Account. The Attorney General may adjust this fee according to the Consumer Price Index.

=== Introduction ===
The 2000 legislative amendment did not explicitly define “Premium Processing”; therefore, the INS used its authority under Section 103(a) of the Act to establish the details of this new service, such as the processing timeframe (15 calendar days) and the Standard Operating Procedures. INS published an interim rule in the Federal Register, Volume 66, No. 106, on June 1, 2001, establishing Premium Processing for employment–based petitions and applications. Premium Processing Service was activated for the majority of Form I-129 categories on June 1, and for the rest on July 30.

On May 23, 2006, USCIS announced that it would roll out the Premium Processing Service for some Form I-140 visa categories (these still support Premium Processing) as well as to some Form I-539 categories (these no longer support Premium Processing) and Form I-765 (this no longer supports Premium Processing).

The rollout continued through 2006. Premium Processing was suspended for Form I-140 on July 2, 2007, and reinstated on June 29, 2009.

In July 2019, USCIS announced that Form I-539 filed along with a principal Form I-129 for a dependent of the Form I-129 beneficiary would no longer be processed in lockstep with the principal Form I-129. In particular, even if the principal Form I-129 had Premium Processing, the Form I-539 may not be processed within the Premium Processing timeframe. This was due to the new biometrics requirements for Form I-539 that made it difficult for USCIS to guarantee turnaround within the 15 calendar days that Premium Processing requires.

The Emergency Stopgap USCIS Stabilization Act, passed on October 1, 2020 as part of the Continuing Appropriations Act, 2021 and Other Extensions Act allowed for a fee increase to $2,500 for all categories except the H-2B and R categories, and to $1,500 for those two categories. It also directed the USCIS to provide Premium Processing Service for all petitions and applications using Form I-129, Form I-140, Form I-539, and Form I-765.

=== Fee changes ===
Here is the history of fee changes:

Fee (in USD)	Date of announcement	Date the new fee would take effect	Notes
1,000	2001	2001	initial fee set in the legislation that directed INS to create the Premium Processing Service
1,225	November 2010	2011	fee increase based on price increases over the last decade
1,410	August 31, 2018	October 1, 2018	fee increase based on price increases over the last decade, using the Consumer Price Index
1,440	October 30, 2019	December 2, 2019	fee increase based on price increases over the last year, using the Consumer Price Index
1,500 (for H-2B and R), 2,500 (for all others)	October 16, 2020	October 19, 2020	fee increased based on the "Emergency Stopgap USCIS Stabilization Act, which requires USCIS to establish and collect additional premium processing fees, and to use those additional funds for expanded purposes."

== Suspensions ==
=== COVID-19 ===
Due to the COVID-19 pandemic in the United States, the USCIS announced on March 20, 2020 that Premium Processing Service would be suspended for all petitions (for both Form I-129 and I-140) effective immediately, and any requests not already accepted would be returned, along with the payment being returned. Already submitted requests for Premium Processing would be refunded if the USCIS failed to take action on the case within the promised 15-day period. This follows a previous announcement of temporary suspension of Premium Processing for cap-subject H-1B petitions for Fiscal Year 2021, with the earliest possible date of resumption of Premium Processing for that category being June 29, 2020.

On May 29, 2020, USCIS announced a phased resumption of Premium Processing through June 2020 as follows:

- June 1 for all Form I-140 petitions
- June 8 for H-1B petitions, that were both cap-exempt and already pending adjudication, as well as all non-H-1B Form I-129 petitions that are already pending adjudication
- June 15 for H-1B petitions that are cap-exempt for specific reasons (including newly filed ones)
- June 22 for all Form I-129 petitions (the remaining ones include newly filed petitions and cap-subject H-1B petitions)

=== New cap-subject H-1B petitions for Fiscal Year 2019 ===
On March 20, 2018, USCIS announced that it would suspend, until September 10, 2018, Premium Processing for all petitions subject to the Fiscal Year 2019 cap (in particular, this would not include transfer petitions or extensions). Petitions for Fiscal Year 2019 (earliest start date possible: October 1, 2018) would open on April 2, 2018. On August 28, 2018, USCIS announced that it was extending this suspension of the Premium Processing Service to February 19, 2019, and also expanding the scope to all H-1B petitions filed at the Vermont and California Service Centers, with some noted exceptions. Petitioners could still make discretionary expedite requests.

=== H-1B petitions from 2017 ===
On Friday, March 3, 2017, USCIS announced that starting Monday, April 3, 2017, Premium Processing would be suspended for all H-1B petitions, and the suspension could last up to six months. April 3, 2017 is the earliest date that H-1B petitions for Fiscal Year 2018 can be submitted, so none of these petitions would be eligible for Premium Processing. These petitions would be eligible for discretionary expedite requests, subject to the usual restrictions placed for such requests. Commentators discussed the suspension in the context of efforts by the administration of newly elected President Donald Trump to change the regulations and procedures surrounding immigration, as well as legislation under discussion that would alter the working of the H-1B program. On September 18, 2017, USCIS lifted the suspension of Premium Processing.

=== Pre-announced delays for processing cap-subject petitions ===
Starting March 2013, USCIS has generally announced a delayed start date from which to start the 15-day counter for premium processing for cap-subject petitions for the H-1B visa. This has been done in anticipation of a huge load of applications and the need to prioritize data collection about all applications. In other words, applicants who requested the Premium Processing Service should expect a response within 15 days of the delayed start date rather than within 15 days of the USCIS receiving the application.

Note that fiscal years 2018 and 2019 are excluded from the table; see the sections above explaining the suspension of premium processing for these fiscal years.

Year for which the applications are made	Date of announcement	Date of delayed start for the 15-day countdown	Date that the USCIS opened applications	Last date that the USCIS accepted cap-subject petitions
Fiscal Year 2014 (begins October 1, 2013)	March 15, 2013	April 15, 2013	April 1, 2013	April 5, 2013
Fiscal Year 2015 (begins October 1, 2014)	March 25, 2014	April 28, 2014	April 1, 2014	April 7, 2014
Fiscal Year 2016 (begins October 1, 2015)	March 12, 2015	May 11, 2015 (initially announced); Later revised to April 27, 2015	April 1, 2015	April 7, 2015
Fiscal Year 2017 (begins October 1, 2016)	March 16, 2016	May 16, 2016 (initially announced); Later revised to May 12, 2016	April 1, 2016	April 7, 2016
Fiscal Year 2020 (begins October 1, 2019)	March 19, 2019	May 20, 2019 for cap-subject change of status petitions; June 10, 2019 for other cap-subject petitions (precise date announced June 7, 2019)	April 1, 2019	April 5, 2019

=== Others ===
In addition to the annual suspension of the Premium Processing Service for cap-subject petitions as described above, USCIS has also temporarily suspended Premium Processing Service for other types of applications in order to preserve resources for other kinds of increased caseloads. For instance, in anticipation of increased caseloads due to the Employment Authorization for Certain H-4 Spouses final rule, USCIS suspended Premium Processing Service for H-1B extension of stay petitions in cap-subject categories for the period from May 26 to July 27, 2015. Those who had already applied for the Premium Processing Service before May 26 would still receive it.

In other cases, USCIS has suspended Premium Processing of petitions in categories where the rules have been in flux. Most recently, the USCIS suspended processing of all H-2B petitions starting March 5, 2015, following a ruling by the United States District Court for the Northern District of Florida in Perez v. Perez. On March 18, the district court granted a motion by the United States Department of Labor to resume issuance of temporary labor certifications for the H-2B program, so the USCIS resumed processing H-2B petitions, but kept Premium Processing suspended. On April 17, 2015, USCIS announced that it was resuming Premium Processing for H-2B petitions starting April 20, 2015.

== Reception ==
Since applying for Premium Processing does not provide any preferential treatment to applicants, commentators have claimed that the main reason companies are willing to pay these fees is because the faster turnarounds allow them and their prospective employees to plan next steps more effectively. This is particularly important in cases of requests for evidence or notices of intent to deny, because of the further iterations needed in order to get approved.

In June 2001, shortly after the introduction of the Premium Processing Service by the Immigration and Naturalization Service (the predecessor to USCIS), Gary Endelman wrote an article in Immigration Daily critical of the Premium Processing Service. He argued that the very fact that people were willing to pay the fee for 15-day processing times highlighted severe inefficiencies and unfunded mandates on the INS, which should not take much longer to process applications in any case. He suggested that rather than allowing the INS to treat these fees as cash cows, the United States legislature should identify clearer, more limited mandates for the agency along with a plan to fund them.

=== Expansion proposals ===
On his personal blog The Asylumist, lawyer Jason Dzubow has mooted the idea of extending premium processing to asylum applications, so that the influx of funds could help the USCIS spend more resources to clear a huge backlog of cases.

There have also been repeated requests to the USCIS to enable premium processing for Form I-526 applications that are a first step to obtaining an EB-5 visa (investor visa). The USCIS itself came up with proposals in August 2011 that would allow Premium Processing Service requests for EB-5 investor applications (made on Form I-526) for projects that were fully developed and ready to go. However, as of April 2015, the Premium Processing Service is still restricted only to Form I-129 and Form I-140 petitions.

After the Emergency Stopgap USCIS Stabilization Act of October 2020 directed USCIS to offer the Premium Processing Service for Form I-539 and Form I-765 in addition to Forms I-129 and I-140, the American Immigration Council published a letter on March 9, 2021, with many signatories, urging USCIS to expand the use of Premium Processing Service per the legislation.

== See also ==
- USCIS immigration forms
