= Notice of Intent to Revoke =

Type of communication in US immigration

A Notice of Intent to Revoke (NOIR) is a communication sent by the United States Citizenship and Immigration Services to a petitioner about a previously approved petition, telling him or her that the USCIS intends to revoke the petition, along with the reasons for revocation, and giving the petitioner a fixed amount of time to respond. NOIRs may be issued for immigrant visa petitions (such as Form I-130 and Form I-140) and for non-immigrant visa petitions (such as Form I-129 and Form I-129F).

== Response protocol ==
The NOIR is sent to, and the response must be sent by, the petitioner (or an attorney representing the petitioner, if the petitioner is using an attorney) rather than the beneficiary. A copy may be sent to the beneficiary for information.

If the petitioner responds within the specified time, then the petitioner's response is considered when making a final decision on whether to revoke the petition. Otherwise, the petition is revoked once the specified time is over. An extension may be granted at the discretion of USCIS if the petitioner needs additional time to obtain documentation from abroad or for other meritorious reasons; however, the petitioner must respond in a timely manner to the NOIR by the stated deadline, and provide a reason for requesting the extra time.

== Steps ==
The NOIR is generally issued when new evidence is presented to the USCIS suggesting that the petition was approved in error (i.e., it should not have been approved) or there has been a change in circumstances making the petition no longer approvable. The most common impetus for issuing a NOIR is that a consular officer (an employee of the United States Department of State) evaluating the beneficiary's visa application based on an approved petition comes across evidence suggesting that the petition should not have been approved, or is no longer approvable. The consular officer issues a Section 221(g) quasi-refusal to the visa applicant, and returns the petition to USCIS for revocation/revalidation, along with the reasons the consular officer believes the petition should not have been approved or is no longer approvable. Petitions relating to non-immigrant visas (such as Form I-129 and Form I-129F) are returned to the Kentucky Service Center whereas petitions related to immigrant visas (such as Form I-130 and Form I-140) are returned to the National Visa Center.

The returned petition is sent to the Service Center where the original petition was processed and a USCIS officer is assigned with the task of re-adjudicating the petition in light of the reasons for returning it. Information about the petition is updated in the USCIS system so that it is reflected in the Case Status Online as well as available to the National Customer Service Center. The petitioner is also notified of the petition being returned.

After re-adjudicating the petition, the USCIS may either refuse to take any revocation action, issue a NOIR, or issue a Notice of Automatic Revocation. If the USCIS revalidates the petition (either directly, or after receiving additional information from the petitioner in response to the NOID), then the same visa application can be resumed with the new information.

After receiving the response from the petitioner, the USCIS officer decides whether to revalidate the petition or revoke it. If the USCIS revokes the petition, the corresponding visa application is definitively denied. If the USCIS revalidates the petition, the information is sent back to the consular officer who should then continue processing the original visa application.

== Processing timeline and uncertainty ==
In 2007, Prakash Khatri, the USCIS ombudsman, sought comments from petitioners and beneficiaries on how to improve the system surrounding consular returns of petitions. The chief complaint by petitioners and beneficiaries was the lack of transparency about what was going on between the time the consular officer returned the petition to the USCIS and the USCIS issuing a NOIR, and this uncertainty often led to the filing of multiple duplicate petitions, thereby increasing costs for petitioners and creating an unnecessary caseload for the USCIS. The following recommendations were made:

- Issue receipt notices to customers when the petition file is returned and received by USCIS Service Centers: The USCIS agreed to this recommendation, and also promised to update the Case Status Online and the National Customer Service Center to reflect the information.
- Establish a nationwide standard for the re-adjudication of petitions returned by consular offices for revocation or revalidation and amends the Operating Instructions/Adjudicator's Field Manual accordingly; include a "REVOCATION" entry in the processing time reports: The USCIS declined to do this, stating that processing times for returned petitions varied widely because of the possibility of a lengthy fraud investigation.
- Provide additional information about revocation or revalidation processes on the USCIS website: USCIS agreed to do so but did not immediately make changes to the website.

== Relationship with RFE and NOID ==
There are two other kinds of communication that the USCIS uses for petitions: the Request For Evidence (RFE) and the Notice of Intent to Deny (NOID). The RFE and NOID differ from the NOIR in one important respect: the RFE and NOID are used for petitions still being adjudicated (i.e., ones that have not yet been approved) whereas the NOIR is used for petitions that have been approved.

In particular, even after the NOIR is issued, the corresponding petition is still considered approved right until the point when it is revoked.

Another difference between NOIRs and the other two is that there are no standard processing timelines for how much time it should take between receiving a returned petition and issuing a NOIR, but there are guidelines on standard processing times for the "initial review" that should end in approval, denial, RFE, or NOID.
