= I-140 =

I-140 may refer to:

- Interstate 140 (North Carolina), a bypass of Wilmington, North Carolina
- Interstate 140 (Tennessee), a spur route in Knoxville, Tennessee
- Form I-140, Immigrant Petition for Alien Worker, a form that needs to be filed as part of the application process for an employment-based visa for the United States
- Iodine-140 (I-140 or ^{140}I), an isotope of iodine
