= Kazarian v. USCIS =

Case in United States immigration law

Kazarian v. USCIS refers to a case decided by the United States Court of Appeals for the Ninth Circuit on March 4, 2010, pertaining to a decision by United States Citizenship and Immigration Services (USCIS) on a Form I-140 EB-1 application. The decision led the USCIS to issue a policy memo (dated December 22, 2010) to change its adjudication process for EB-1 and EB-2 petitions to a "two-step review" where the first step would focus on counting pieces of evidence and the second step would be a final merits determination. The case has been cited by USCIS as well as by petitioners in hundreds of Form I-140 petitions and appeals since 2010.

== Past policy and precedents ==
The EB-1 category was introduced as part of the Immigration Act of 1990. Since that time, the Immigration and Naturalization Services (INS), and later, United States Citizenship and Immigration Services (USCIS) have worked to clarify the process for EB-1 petitions. Some key developments prior to the Kazarian case are listed below:

- In 1992, James Bailey, director of the Northern Service Center of INS, noted two schools of thought for adjudicating petitions: one focused on counting lines of evidence, and the other focused on determining whether, in addition to the number of lines of evidence, the alien stood out as having high quality. Bailey sided with the latter approach.
- In response, Acting Associate Commissioner of Examinations Lawrence Weinig replied that the specification of lines of evidence made the petitioner's and adjudicator's life easier. However, the lines of evidence did not simply involve counting pieces of paper but also critical examination to determine whether it was satisfied. Weinig's response served as unofficial policy guidance.
- In 1994, in Matter of Price, the USCIS's Administrative Appeals Office (AAO) limited the USCIS' review of submitted documentation to the regulatory text and prohibited moving beyond the regulations.
- In 1994, in Buletini v. INS, the United States District Court for the Eastern District of Michigan held that if the petitioner satisfied the three lines of evidence, then the INS must provide specific and substantiated reasons for denying the petition. The opinion cited Weinig's 1992 letter.
- In 1995, the INS issued a proposed rule adding language to the EB-1 regulations noting that meeting three of the evidentiary standards was not dispositive of extraordinary ability, and the alien still bore the burden of proof. The rule received public comment but was never finalized and promulgated.

== Background and case ==
=== Petitioner's background ===
Poghos Kazarian grew up in Armenia. He received a Ph.D in Theoretical Physics from Yerevan State University in Yerevan, Armenia in 1997. From 1997 to 2000, he remained at YSU as a Research Associate, where he specialized in non-Einsteinian theories of gravitation. From 2000 to 2004, he worked as a Physics/Math/Programming Tutor, an Adjunct Physics and Mathematics Instructor, and a Science Lecture Series speaker at Glendale Community College, California, in the United States. He was also a member of a research group at the California Institute of Technology, located close to Glendale Community College, where he worked with American theoretical physicist Kip Thorne. He also authored the self-published textbook Concepts in Physics: Classical Mechanics. He published in journals such as Astrophysics and worked on cosmogony problems posed by Victor Ambartsumian.

Kazarian's time in the United States was spent on a visitor visa (B visa) that precludes formal employment. His teaching and tutoring work were carried out in a volunteer capacity, though he did earn some income as reported on a Form 1040. Although he was listed as working at YSU till 2000, his immigration documentation shows that he had been in the United States in visitor status since October 1998.

=== EB-1 petition ===
On December 31, 2003, at the age of 34, Kazarian submitted a Form I-140 petition for EB-1 status. Kazarian's petition was filed by the lawyer George Verdin. Verdin had been disbarred from law practice in the state of Hawaii in 1999 and placed on the Executive Office for Immigration Review's List of Currently Disciplined Practitioners in 2000. Verdin's history as a lawyer would be referenced in later discussions of the appropriateness of the petition category and evidence submitted.

The petition included support for the following pieces of evidence that were used to justify eligibility for EB-1 status; at least three pieces of evidence must be matched in order to qualify for the EB-1:

- Evidence of receipt of lesser nationally or internationally recognized prizes or awards for excellence:
  - A medal for high school graduation with honors by the Ministry of Education of Armenia. The petitioner included a caption stating that the medal was awarded for "success in studies, labor and for the exemplary behavior."
  - A letter from the Dean of the Physics Department at YSU stating that the petitioner "was awarded by the Dean's Honor for Excellence in Study During 5 Years (1989 to 1994)."
  - Selection for Marquis Who's Who.
- Documentation of the alien's membership in associations in the field for which classification is sought, which require outstanding achievements of their members, as judged by recognized national or international experts in their disciplines or fields.
  - Solicitation to join the American Chemical Society
  - Solicitation to join the American Association for the Advancement of Science
  - Membership in the New York Academy of Sciences
- Published materials about the alien in professional or major trade publications or other major media, relating to the alien's work in the field for which classification is sought. Such evidence shall include the title, date, and author of the material, and any necessary translation.
  - An article, "The Young Talent from America", that the petitioner said was published in the Armenian magazine Louys, that he contended was the nation's largest weekly publication.
  - An article about the petitioner's immigration troubles, published in an unidentified newspaper.
  - A television interview regarding his professional activities to the Armenian National Network.
- Evidence of the alien's participation, either individually or on a panel, as a judge of the work of others in the same or an allied field of specification for which classification is sought.
  - A letter from Professor Chubarian, the Head of the Department of Theoretical Physics at YSU stating that the petitioner was involved in teaching activities and reviewing diploma works.
- Evidence of the alien's original scientific, scholarly, artistic, athletic, or business-related contributions of major significance in the field.
  - Letters from prominent scientists at the California Institute of Technology, including Kip Thorne, as well as from Paolo Pirjanian of the Jet Propulsion Laboratory.
  - Letters from colleagues at Glendale Community College
  - Letters from people at YSU who knew the petitioner while he was there
- Evidence of the alien's authorship of scholarly articles in the field, in professional or major trade publications or other major media.
  - Published articles by the petitioners in various physics journals, such as Astrophysics
  - A self-published book, Concepts in Physics: Classical Mechanics, with reviews by colleagues at Glendale Community College, who said the college was considering using the book as a text.

Below are the remaining types of evidence that can be considered for an EB-1 application, but that were of less relevance to the petition:

- Evidence of the display of the alien's work in the field at artistic exhibitions or in showcases: The later appeal would claim that the petitioner's self-published book, community college lectures, and conference presentations met this criterion.
- Evidence that the alien has performed in a leading or critical role for organizations: No claims were made for this line of evidence.
- Evidence that the alien has commanded a high salary or other significantly high remuneration for services, in relation to others in the field. The petitioner submitted a Form 1040 tax return for 2004 showing $4,765 in wages, but no claims were made about this being unusually high remuneration.
- Evidence of commercial success in the performing arts, as shown by box office receipts or record, cassette, compact disk, or video sales: The later appeal would claim that the petitioner's self-published book, that would be considered by Glendale Community College as a text, would qualify due to the potential for high sales.

=== Denial of the petition and of the appeal ===
In August 2005, Kazarian's Form I-140 EB-1 petition was denied by the USCIS California Service Center. Kazarian appealed the denial. The USCIS Administrative Appeals Office (AAO) dismissed the appeal on September 28, 2006. The case as decided by the AAO is referred to as Matter of Kazarian, consistent with the USCIS' naming of appeal cases.

The AAO concurred with the reasoning offered by the California Service Center for denial, and provided additional elaboration on some points. The AAO's decision did not admit any of the lines of evidence that the petitioner had used, noting that they either did not apply or fell far short of the level needed for EB-1 status. Below is a summary of AAO's reasons for rejecting the various lines of evidence that were seriously considered:

- Evidence of receipt of lesser nationally or internationally recognized prizes or awards for excellence: AAO argued that the prizes were not tied to the petitioner's professional achievements but achieved at a younger age. It also noted the lack of evidence for these being indicators of significant accomplishment.
- Documentation of the alien's membership in associations in the field for which classification is sought, which require outstanding achievements of their members, as judged by recognized national or international experts in their disciplines or fields: The AAO noted that the petitioner had not submitted evidence of membership in these organizations being exclusive, that many of them had fairly large memberships, and that one of them was not even in the petitioner's profession.
- Published materials about the alien in professional or major trade publications or other major media, relating to the alien's work in the field for which classification is sought. Such evidence shall include the title, date, and author of the material, and any necessary translation: The AAO noted that the copies of articles submitted did not clearly include the name of the publication, and that corroborating information for the claims of circulation were not provided. Further, one of the articles were not even about the petitioner's professional work, and no clear evidence was provided about the television appearance.
- Evidence of the alien's original scientific, scholarly, artistic, athletic, or business-related contributions of major significance in the field: The AAO noted that most of the letters were by colleagues rather than unaffiliated people, and did not offer sufficiently specific examples of the impact that Kazarian's work had had. Even the review by Thorne, it noted, only placed Kazarian at the level of a "young professor at a strong, research-oriented university in the United States" and this was deemed to not meet the standard needed for the EB-1. The AAO also noted that the self-published book had no ISBN and no evidence of adoption so far, did not constitute sufficient evidence as of the time of the petition.
- Evidence of the alien's authorship of scholarly articles in the field, in professional or major trade publications or other major media: The AAO noted that Kazarian's academic output matched that expected of post-doctoral fellows, and that no evidence had been submitted to show that it was substantially above that standard.

=== Court case ===
Having exhausted administrative remedies provided within the immigration bureaucracy, Kazarian filed a complaint with the United States District Court for the Central District of California. The USCIS filed a motion for summary judgment, and the judge Manuel Real granted the motion. Kazarian timely appealed to the United States Court of Appeals for the Ninth Circuit.

The case was argued and submitted on December 9, 2008. An initial opinion and dissent were filed on September 4, 2009. The initial opinion upheld the USCIS and AAO's decision completely. In response, Bernard Wolfsdorf, an immigration lawyer who has served as president of the American Immigration Lawyers Association, sought review of the decision. According to immigration lawyer Cyrus D. Mehta, who informally helped with brainstorming, the purpose of seeking review was not to overturn the decision in its entirety but to discredit some of the AAO's reasoning.

The decision was filed on March 4, 2010. The opinion was delivered by the judge Dorothy Wright Nelson, with concurrence by Harry Pregerson. Although the decision was against the petitioner, the arguments included in the court's opinion were considered a victory by immigration lawyers at the time, accomplishing the purpose sought by the push to seek review.

==== Opinion of the court (by Nelson) ====
The court noted that the AAO had concluded that Kazarian had provided evidence for zero of the ten types of evidence (compared to the minimum requirement of three). However, the court argued that for two of the ten types of evidence, Kazarian had provided enough initial evidence and the AAO's grounds for rejecting the evidence were based on a misinterpretation of the regulations. The two lines of evidence where the court said that AAO had erred were:

- Authorship of scholarly articles in the field of endeavor: The court noted that "Nothing in that provision requires a petitioner to demonstrate the research community's reaction to his published articles before those articles can be considered as evidence, and neither USCIS nor an AAO may impose novel evidentiary requirements beyond those set forth."
- Participation as a judge of the work of others: The court noted that "Nothing in that provision suggests that whether judging university dissertations counts as evidence turns on which university the judge is affiliated with."

In the process of elaborating on its reasoning, the court proposed a two-step process, as follows:

- The first step should focus on counting the number of lines of evidence for which evidence was presented as required by the regulations. If the number of lines of evidence that passed through the first step was less than three, the petition could be rejected directly, without detailed examination.
- The second step, a "final merits determination", was subjecting the evidence to critical scrutiny. If they held up to critical scrutiny, the petition would be accepted. At this stage, additional evidence could be sought from the petitioner.

The court held that the AAO had erred by imposing additional evidentiary requirements. However, since this error was made on only two of the ten lines of evidence, and the petition should have been rejected anyway, the error was "harmless": it did not materially affect the adjudication.

==== Concurrence (by Pregerson) ====
Pregerson, while concurring with Nelson's opinion, noted that Kazarian would have been an excellent candidate for the EB-2 visa (exceptional ability) and that it was a mistake on the part of his lawyer to suggest he apply for the EB-1. This was consistent with the fact that Kazarian's original lawyer, George Verdin, was on the List of Currently Disciplined Practitioners maintained by the Executive Office for Immigration Review.

== Impact ==
=== 2010 Policy Memorandum ===
On August 20, 2010, the USCIS published an interim policy memo for comment (comment period ending September 3, 2010). The memo proposed using the two-step process proposed by the court in its decision on the case. The memo accordingly announced corresponding changes to the Adjudicator's Field Manual (Chapter 22.2, with the update called AFM Update AD11-14), the manual used by USCIS officers (known as Immigration Service Officers, or ISOs) while adjudicating cases.

The USCIS described the two steps as follows:

- Part One: Evaluate Whether the Evidence Provided Meets any of the Regulatory Criteria: The determination here is limited to determining whether the evidence submitted with the petition demonstrates either a one-time achievement or at least three of the ten regulatory criteria, applying a preponderance of evidence standard. Specific guidelines on the standard to apply for each of the ten criteria was included.
- Part Two: Final Merits Determination: The quality of the evidence is considered, to determine whether the criteria were met to an extent that shows the alien to be within the top of his or her profession. This part should also use a preponderance of evidence standard, but applied to the claim of being at the top of the field of endeavor rather than meeting the regulatory criteria.

The official version of the memo was published on December 22, 2010, and the changes to the Adjudicator's Field Manual were finalized.

=== Changes to how petitions were prepared ===
The case and the subsequent USCIS policy changes affected the way subsequent EB-1 petitions were prepared, as well as the way USCIS evaluated these petitions. The impact can be seen from the large number of AAO cases since 2010 where Kazarian v. USCIS has been cited.

One recurrent theme of advice for a successful EB-1 petition after Kazarian has been to focus the petition on the lines of evidence where the strongest case can be made, and make a case using those lines of evidence based on strong, objective evidence meeting USCIS' regulatory guidelines.

=== Amicus briefs and criticism of final merits determination ===
On August 18, 2011, the AAO announced that it was seeking amicus curiae briefs addressing its December 2010 policy memo. A number of briefs were submitted, including one by the American Immigration Lawyers Association (AILA). The AILA's brief was critical of USCIS's current framework for final merits determination, and argued that the two-step approach should look as follows:

- The AILA agreed that the first step should count the number of lines of evidence for which the petitioner meets a preponderance of evidence standard.
- For the second step, however, the AILA argued that the burden of proof should now fall on the USCIS officer to show that the petition should not be approved, and the default trajectory should be for the petition to be approved. This was similar to the opinion offered in Buletini v. INS. The subjective final merits determination was deemed to give the USCIS too much discretionary power.

Opinions similar to the AILA's have been voiced by immigration lawyers discussing Kazarian in subsequent years.

=== DHS Ombudsman recommendations ===
On December 29, 2011, the DHS Ombudsman published the following recommendations:

1. Conduct formal rulemaking to clarify the regulatory standard, and if desired, explicitly incorporate a final merits determination into the regulations: The Administrative Procedure Act (APA) was cited as the reason for this recommendation.
2. In the interim, provide public guidance on the application of a final merits determination.
3. In the interim, provide Immigration Service Officers (those who adjudicate petitions) with additional guidance and training on the proper application of preponderance of the evidence standard when adjudicating EB-1-1, EB-1-2, and EB-2 petitions.

=== Further court cases ===
The reasoning in Kazarian v. USCIS was upheld by courts in later cases, such as Rijal v. USCIS, where the United States District Court for the Western District of Washington rebuked the USCIS for conflating the two steps of its two-step approach in the reasoning it used to reject petitioner Anil Rijal's EB-1 petition. Although this court case was decided after the Kazarian memo was official practice, the USCIS' denial of the petition had happened prior to the memo.
