= Alien of extraordinary ability =

American immigration classification

Alien of extraordinary ability is an alien classification by United States Citizenship and Immigration Services. The United States may grant a priority visa to an alien who is able to demonstrate "extraordinary ability in the sciences, arts, education, business, or athletics" or through some other extraordinary career achievements.

The immigrant version of the classification (EB-1A), which grants permanent residency, additionally requires the alien to demonstrate "sustained national or international acclaim", "achievements recognized by others in the field of expertise", and "a level of expertise indicating that the individual is one of that small percentage who have risen to the very top of the field of endeavor". It has the important advantage that the petitioner can self sponsor rather than relying on an employer sponsor. Depending on country of origin, this category may also allow one to bypass waiting lists of many years.

It is known colloquially as a "genius visa" or "artists' visa" (many of the recipients are artists).

It can be granted on immigrant or non-immigrant basis. The immigrant version is known as EB-1A (officially, E11 or E16 classification), and the non-immigrant version is known as O-1.

== Distinction between EB-1A and O-1 ==
The immigrant version (EB-1A) is known to have a much more stringent standard than the non-immigrant version. In some cases an EB-1A petition may be filed on behalf of an alien who was previously granted the O-1, alien of extraordinary ability non-immigrant classification. Though the prior approval of an O-1 petition on behalf of the alien may be a relevant consideration in adjudicating the EB-1A petition, the adjudicator is not bound by the fact that the alien was previously accorded the O-1 classification if the facts do not support approval of the EB-1A petition; eligibility as an O-1 nonimmigrant does not automatically establish eligibility under the EB-1A criteria for extraordinary ability. Each petition is separate and independent and must be adjudicated on its own merits, under the corresponding statutory and regulatory provisions. Moreover, the O-1 non-immigrant classification includes different standards and criteria for aliens in the arts, athletics, and the motion picture industry. In such cases, there would be nothing inconsistent about finding that an alien in the arts has “distinction” according to the non-immigrant criteria, but not “national or international acclaim” according to the immigrant criteria.

== Immigrant EB-1A visa (E11/E16) ==
=== Description ===
An alien meeting the extraordinary ability criteria may be eligible for an employment-based, first-preference EB-1 immigrant visa. An alien must be able to demonstrate extraordinary ability in the sciences, arts, education, business, or athletics through sustained national or international acclaim. Achievements must be recognized through extensive documentation. No offer of employment is required.

An alien must provide evidence of a one-time achievement (i.e., Pulitzer, Oscar, Olympic Medal), or meet 3 of 10 criteria below and demonstrate that he or she has:

- A level of expertise indicating that the individual is "one of that small percentage who have risen to the very top of the field of endeavor".
- Sustained national or international acclaim and that his or her achievements have been recognized in the field of expertise.

E11 classification and E16 classification are the same except E11 is issued for people currently living outside the United States, whereas E16 is issued to people who currently reside in the United States and would like to adjust their immigration status.

=== Eligibility criteria ===
The alien must prove eligibility by meeting the requirement in a two-step analysis, according to a standard adopted by USCIS since 2010 (see Kazarian v. USCIS).

==== Part One: Initial evidence ====
In Part One, the alien must meet three out of the ten listed criteria below to prove extraordinary ability in the field:

- Evidence of receipt of lesser nationally or internationally recognized prizes or awards for excellence
- Evidence of membership in associations in the field, which demand outstanding achievement of their members
- Evidence of published material about you in professional or major trade publications or other major media
- Evidence of judging the work of others, either individually or on a panel
- Evidence of original scientific, scholarly, artistic, athletic, or business-related contributions of major significance to the field
- Evidence of authorship of scholarly articles in professional or major trade publications or other major media
- Evidence that work has been displayed at artistic exhibitions or showcases
- Evidence of performance of a leading or critical role in distinguished organizations
- Evidence that of high salary or other significantly high remuneration in relation to others in the field
- Evidence of commercial successes in the performing arts

In addition to the above, the regulations add the following flexibility: "If the above standards do not readily apply to the beneficiary's occupation, the petitioner may submit comparable evidence to establish the beneficiary's eligibility."

==== Part two: Final merits determination ====
Meeting the minimum requirement of providing evidence relating to at least three criteria does not, in itself, establish that the alien in fact meets the requirements for classification as an alien of extraordinary ability under section 203(b)(1)(A) of the INA. In making this determination, the court in Kazarian v. USCIS recognized that the quality of the evidence, such as whether the judging responsibilities were internal and whether the scholarly articles (if pertinent to the occupation) are cited, is an appropriate consideration in the final merits determination. In addition, the alien's performance at the so-called major-league level does not automatically establish that he or she meets the extraordinary ability standards. See Matter of Price, 20 I&N, Dec. 3241 citing to 56 FR 60899 (Nov. 29, 1991). Finally, Congress intended that in the absence of a one-time achievement, an alien could qualify for the classification based on a "career of acclaimed work." H.R. Rep. No. 101-723, 59 (Sept. 19, 1990).

In Part Two of the analysis in each case, the adjudicator must consider all of the evidence to make a final merits determination of whether or not the petitioner, by a preponderance of the evidence, has demonstrated that the alien has:

- A level of expertise indicating that the individual is "one of that small percentage who have risen to the very top of the field of endeavor." 8 CFR 204.5(h)(2); and
- Sustained national or international acclaim and that his or her achievements have been recognized in the field of expertise. 8 CFR 204.5(h)(3).

=== Advantages ===
The EB-1A, unlike its non-immigrant counterpart, provides a pathway to citizenship. Unlike most employment based pathways to citizenship, if someone can qualify as an EB-1A alien of extraordinary ability, that person can self sponsor without the need for their employer to sponsor them. A green card can be granted on the basis of an EB-1A (but not an O-1) approval. Once the green card is granted, the standard waiting period of five years--which applies to immigrants in many categories--is generally required before applying for citizenship.

=== Appeals process ===
Although the EB-1A application is an administrative process, a denial can be appealed through the US federal court system. Another ice dancer, Christina Carreira, applied for EB-1A but was denied. She appealed that denial through the US federal court system. Carreira argued in the appeal that the criteria used in her case were unreasonable because they were so restrictive that, were they to be applied generally, they would allow no athletes at all to qualify as aliens of extraordinary ability. After winning her US green card, Carreira competed for the US and won a bronze medal at the 2022 Four Continents Figure Skating Championships.

== Non-immigrant O-1 visa ==
=== Description ===
The O1 nonimmigrant visa is for an alien who possesses extraordinary ability in the sciences, arts, education, business, or athletics, or who has a demonstrated record of extraordinary achievement in the motion picture or television industry and has been recognized nationally or internationally for those achievements.

=== Eligibility criteria ===
Eligibility criteria for O-1A visa should include an evidence that the beneficiary has received a major award, such as a Nobel Prize, or evidence of at least three of the following:

- Receipt of nationally or internationally recognized prizes or awards
- Membership in associations in the field for which classification is sought which require outstanding achievements
- Published material in professional or major trade publications, newspapers or other major media
- Original scientific, scholarly, or business-related contributions of major significance in the field
- Authorship of scholarly articles in professional journals or other major media
- A high salary or other remuneration for services as evidenced by contracts
- Participation on a panel, or individually, as a judge of the work of others
- Employment in a critical or essential capacity for organizations and establishments, that have a distinguished reputation.

== List of notable recipients ==
=== EB-1A (E11/E16) ===
- Bettina May (b. 1979), pin-up model, burlesque dancer and photographer
- Dirk Nowitzki (b. 1978), basketball player
- John Lennon, (1940–1980) English singer-songwriter, co-lead vocalist, rhythm guitarist and founding member of the Beatles.
- Tanith Belbin, Canadian-American ice dancer who used the EB-1A classification to obtain US citizenship in time to win a silver medal for the US at the 2006 Winter Olympics
- Yoko Ono
- Melania Trump, a Slovene–American model and businesswoman who was First Lady of the United States from 2017 to 2021, and as of 2025 is again serving as the First Lady of the United States.
- Nordine Zouareg, Former Mr. Universe, Bestselling Author, International Speaker, Coach
- Hassan Uriostegui, Mexican software engineer, product founder, and AI researcher; co-founder of FlyrTV and founder of WakenAI. He achieved U.S. citizenship through the EB-1A program, recognizing his extraordinary career in computer science. His article on AI copyright and model weights was later cited by the U.S. House Bipartisan Task Force on Artificial Intelligence in its 2024 report.

=== O-1 ===
- Shera Bechard
- Justin Bieber
- Clive Crook
- Gavin Free
- Jolina Magdangal, a Filipina actress, recording artist, and concert performer
- Piers Morgan
- Gary Numan
- John Oliver
- Pelé
- Psy
- Taron Egerton
- Mubarak Muyika, Silicon–valley based Entrepreneur known for founding his first company at 16 and selling it two years later in a six figure deal.
- Julio Torres, whose film Problemista is a loosely autobiographical account of Torres getting his Visa
- Aaron Chen, who has joked about it in his stand up
