= Form I-140 =

I-140, Immigrant Petition for Alien Worker

Form I-140, Immigrant Petition for Alien Worker, 2016

Form I-140, Immigrant Petition for Alien Worker is a form submitted to the United States Citizenship and Immigration Services (USCIS) by a prospective employer to petition an alien to work in the U.S. on a permanent basis. This is done in the case when the worker is deemed extraordinary in some sense or when qualified workers do not exist in the U.S. The employer who files is called the petitioner, and the alien employee is called the beneficiary; these two can coincide in the case of a self-petitioner. The form is 6 pages long with a separate 10-page instructions document as of 2016. It is one of the USCIS immigration forms.

== Reasons for filing Form I-140 ==
Form I-140 is required for EB categories EB-1, EB-2, and EB-3. For EB-4 and EB-5, Forms I-360 and I-526 are used, respectively. These categories were introduced as part of the Immigration Act of 1990.

The following is a list of all of the reasons (also known as petition types) for filing Form I-140.

Petition type	Visa	Labor certification-based?
An alien of extraordinary ability	EB-1	No
An outstanding professor or researcher	EB-1	No
A multinational executive or manager	EB-1	No
A member of the professions holding an advanced degree or bachelor's degree with minimum of 5 years work experience post-bachelor's degree or an alien of exceptional ability (who is not seeking a National Interest Waiver)	EB-2	Yes
A professional (at a minimum, possessing a bachelor's degree or a foreign degree equivalent to a U.S. bachelor's degree)	EB-3	Yes
A skilled worker (requiring at least 2 years of specialized training or experience)	EB-3	Yes
Any other worker (requiring less than 2 years of training or experience)	EB-3	Yes
An alien applying for a National Interest Waiver (who is a member of the professions holding an advanced degree or an alien of exceptional ability)	EB-2	No

== Filing details ==
=== Initial evidence ===
The Form I-140 petition must be accompanied by what is termed "initial evidence". This evidence depends on the type of employee being sponsored, but for instance (in some cases) includes an award given to the employee or publication by the employee that certifies they are someone of extraordinary ability. In many cases (see table above), part of the initial evidence is a Permanent Labor Certification, which establishes, among other things, that there are insufficient workers in the US to fill the position the alien employee plans to take. In cases where a labor certification is required, the petition is said to be labor certification-based.

In labor certification-based petitions, a Permanent Labor Certification must be filed and approved by the US Department of Labor before Form I-140 can be submitted. It is possible to establish a successor-in-interest relationship between the successor employer and predecessor employer, in which case a predecessor's labor certification can be used.

=== General evidence ===
Additional evidence that must be provided includes the employer's financial data, proof of the employee's education and work experience, as well as evidence that the employer can pay the proffered wage to the employee.

In its Policy Manual, USCIS lists four ways an employer can prove that they can pay the wage:

- SEC Form 10-K: Publicly traded companies can submit the annual reports filed with the U.S. Securities and Exchange Commission (SEC) or sent to their shareholders as evidence.
- Federal Tax Returns: All companies can submit the federal returns they annually file with the IRS.
- Audited Financial Statements: USCIS defines financial statements as having been audited when there is proof they have been examined under an acceptable standard by an accountant authorized by the jurisdiction (usually state) in which the company operates to perform the audit.
- Financial Officer Statement: When a petitioning organization has at least 100 employees, the ability to pay the offered wage can be demonstrated through a statement provided by one of its financial officers.

In some situations, the petitioner may choose to provide, or USCIS may ask for, supplementary documentation, including profit and loss statements, bank account records, or personnel files.

The alien can in addition self-petition in the cases of EB1-A Alien of Extraordinary Ability or EB-2 National Interest Waiver.

The form must be signed to be valid.

=== Forms submitted alongside ===
Form I-907, Request for Premium Processing Service, is required if the petitioner is requesting Premium Processing.

Form I-140 may be filed concurrently with Form I-485, Application to Register Permanent Residence or Adjust Status.

=== Filing modalities ===
Form I-140 can be filed by paper or electronically. If the form is filed electronically, it will be sent to an appropriate service center.

=== Addresses ===
The filing address for Form I-140 depends on whether Form I-140 is being filed on its own or concurrently with Form I-485. The filing address can also differ by the state the beneficiary will work in for Premium Processing.

=== Filing fees ===
The fee for filing Form I-140 is $715, and must be payable in US currency to the US Department of Homeland Security. There is also a $2,800 fee for Premium Processing (next section).

However, this fee does not include:

- In the case the beneficiary is already in the United States, the fee for Form I-485 (filed separately by the beneficiary, so not part of the petition), which can range from $750 to $1140 depending on the category, plus an $85 biometrics fee.
- In the case the beneficiary is not in the United States, the immigrant visa application processing fee that, as of May 2015, is $325.
- In the case the beneficiary is not in the United States, the $220 USCIS immigrant fee, which is needed to process the immigrant visa packet and produce and send to the applicant the Green Card.

=== Premium Processing: Form I-907 ===
The USCIS offers a Premium Processing Service at an additional fee of $2,800 for Form I-140 petitions. Premium Processing is only available for this form and for Form I-129 (non-immigrant worker). The Premium Processing Service promises an initial review from the USCIS within 15 calendar days of receipt of the form, after which time it may approve, deny, or issue a Request For Evidence or Notice of Intent to Deny. USCIS will refund the Premium Processing Service fee if processing takes longer than 15 days. If the fee is refunded, the relating case will continue to receive expedited processing. The time begins from the receipt of Form I-907 and the associated fee.

The Premium Processing Service was introduced in 2001 for Form I-129 and extended to Form I-140 in 2006.

Premium Processing does not guarantee a final adjudication; it only provides a time limit for initial review of the petition. In other words, the 15 calendar day guarantee is only for the initial review of the petition, which may result in approval, denial, or the issuing of a Request For Evidence or Notice of Intent to Deny.

For immigrant visa allocation, the Form I-140 petition must be approved and the priority date assigned to that petition must be before the cutoff date (which depends on the country of chargeability and the visa category). Since the cutoff date and the processing time for Form I-140 petitions are independent, the wait time for Form I-140 to be processed is the later of the visa number availability time (the cutoff date) and the Form I-140 processing time. Therefore, Premium Processing can expedite the overall process of obtaining lawful permanent resident status when the Form I-140 processing time is longer than the visa number availability time. In other words, if there is no visa number availability wait time, either because the category is uncapped or the caps are nowhere near being met, then Premium Processing is advantageous. On the other hand, for a visa category with a country of chargeability where the current cutoff date is far in the past (i.e. there is a long queue), Premium Processing would not expedite the overall process because the cutoff date overwhelms even the standard processing time.

It is possible to apply for Premium Processing on an already-submitted application. In this case, the clock for Premium Processing begins when the Premium Processing is requested.

== Benefits of having an approved Form I-140 petition ==
Q 67 and Section 106 of the American Competitiveness in the 21st Century Act (AC21) includes special provisions in case of lengthy adjudications. In particular, it allows extensions by one year at a time of the H-1B status for people with long-pending Form I-140 petitions (pending for at least 365 days). Here, "pending" includes an appeal that is pending. It also allows people with Form I-485 petitions that have been pending for more than 180 days to switch jobs without invalidating the underlying Form I-140 and labor certification. However, there is an ambiguity in cases where an extension is obtained but subsequently the Form I-140 petition is denied.

Under one of the provisions of the LIFE Act, the USCIS would overlook unlawful entry and unlawful presence when considering some Adjustment of Status applications for people whose Form I-140 had been filed by April 30, 2001 (with a number of additional caveats).

== Statistics ==
=== Rate of approvals ===
The approval rate for aliens of extraordinary ability has ranged from 47% to 62% during the years 2005–2010. For outstanding professors or researchers, this has ranged from 90% to 95% during the same years.

=== Processing times ===
USCIS processes Form I-140 on a first-come, first-served basis, so at any given time, the date received for the forms that have just finished processing provides a good estimate of processing time. USCIS breaks down Form I-140 into eight categories and reports processing times separately for each:

- Extraordinary Ability (EB-1)
- Outstanding Professor or Researcher (EB-1)
- Multinational Manager or Executive (EB-1)
- Advanced Degree Professional (EB-2)
- Skilled or Professional Worker (EB-3)
- Unskilled Worker (EB-3)
- Advanced degree or exceptional ability requesting a National Interest Waiver (EB-2)
- Schedule A Nurses (EB-2 or EB-3)

The processing time is on average about four months.

There are separate processing times reported for the appeals processing. As of February 1, 2016, the processing times for administrative appeals for all categories of Form I-140 is 6 months or less.

== Adverse decisions ==
=== Initial response ===
The initial response from the USCIS to a Form I-140 is one of these four:

- Approval
- Denial
- Request for Evidence (RFE): Generally, evidence is requested about the relationship between the petitioner and beneficiary. For instance, for marriage-based petitions (where one spouse is petitioning for another) evidence that the marriage actually occurred, and that there was no marriage fraud, is sought.
- Notice of Intent to Deny (NOID): This is an advance notice that the petition is likely to be denied, along with reasons for the proposed denial. The petitioner is given a limited amount of time to respond.

In the case of a RFE or NOID, the petitioner's response will be taken into account by the USCIS when deciding whether to approve or deny the petition.

=== Standalone filing: revocation of petition and Notice of Intent to Revoke ===
Based on new evidence suggesting that the original petition was fraudulent, the USCIS may issue a revocation of petition (i.e., revoke the petition entirely) or send the petitioner a Notice of Intent to Revoke, to which the petitioner may respond with additional evidence or challenge the reasons. The typical impetus for the USCIS to reconsider an approved petition is when a United States consular officer evaluating the beneficiary's visa application based on the petition encounters evidence suggesting that the petition was fraudulent. If the consular office finds such evidence, he or she returns the petition to USCIS along with the reasons the petition appears fraudulent, and issues a Section 221(g) quasi-refusal to the applicant (note that this is relevant to cases 2 and 3, and not to case 1 where the beneficiary is already in the United States). The following are worth noting:

- A consular officer may reject the beneficiary's visa application without returning the petition to the USCIS. This is because the consular officer has many potential grounds for rejecting the application without calling the legitimacy of the petition in question.
- After the consular officer returns the petition to the USCIS, the USCIS may decide that the petition is valid and tell the consular officer that. if the USCIS revalidates the petition, then the consular officer must use this information and proceed with the same visa application (i.e., the beneficiary need not re-apply for a visa).

=== Re-application and appeals process ===
It is possible to reapply for a Form I-140 petition if the original petition results in denial or revocation. When reapplying, all previously submitted evidence must be resubmitted, and filing fee must be paid again. In addition, the receipt number from the previous I-140 petition must be given.

If there is additional evidence available to the petitioner that could lead to the original petition being approvable, it is possible to file a motion to reopen or reconsider the petition. For this, Form I-290B, Notice of Appeal or Motion, must be filed within 30 days of the denial (15 days in case of revocation).

Third, it is possible to appeal the decision, in which case Form I-290B, Notice of Appeal or Motion, must be filed within 30 days of the denial (15 days in case of revocation) for processing by the USCIS Administrative Appeals Office (AAO). Note that although the form submitted is the same for appeals or motions, the way the form is filled makes clear whether the form is being used for an appeal or motion. In case of an appeal it is not necessary to submit new evidence, since the claim is that the original denial or revocation was incorrect in light of the evidence available at the time. The AAO has a processing time goal of 6 months or less for appeals, but current processing times are not reported. Appeals have historically taken up to 35 months to be adjudicated; for this reason law resources often recommend reapplying.

Finally, if the AAO returns an adverse decision, it is also possible to file a motion to reconsider with the AAO itself.

The AAO is the final point of appeal within USCIS. Beyond this, the decision can be appealed within the federal judicial system. An example of an appeal was the case of Kazarian v. USCIS (2010).

== Relation with overall immigrant visa process ==
The filing of Form I-140 is one step of the overall process to become a lawful permanent resident. The entire process typically takes several years.

1. Labor certification (also called the PERM process). If the petition is labor certification-based, the employer must legally prove that it has a need to hire an alien for a specific position and that there is no minimally qualified U.S. citizen or LPR available to fill that position, hence the reason for hiring the alien. This is currently done through an electronic system known as PERM. This step is processed by the United States Department of Labor (DOL). The labor certification is valid for 6 months from the time it is approved.
2. Immigrant petition. The employer applies on the alien's behalf to obtain a visa number. The application is Form I-140, the topic of this page. Currently, this process takes up to 6 months.
3. Immigrant visa availability. When the immigrant petition is approved by the USCIS, the petition is forwarded to the NVC for visa allocation. Currently this step centers around the priority date concept.
4. Immigrant visa adjudication. When the National Visa Center (NVC) determines that an immigrant visa is available, the case can be adjudicated. If the alien is already in the US, that alien has a choice to finalize the green card process via adjustment of status in the US, or via consular processing abroad. If the alien beneficiary is outside of the US, they can only apply for an immigrant visa at the US consulate. The USCIS does not allow an alien to pursue consular processing and adjustment of status (AOS) simultaneously. Prior to filing the form I-485 (Adjustment of Status) it is required that the applicant have a medical examination performed by a USCIS-approved civil surgeon. The examination includes a blood test and specific immunizations, unless the applicant provides proof that the required immunizations were already done elsewhere. The civil surgeon hands the applicant a sealed envelope containing a completed form I-693, which must be included unopened with the I-485 application. (The cited reference also states that the February 25, 2010 edition of the Form I-693 reflects that an individual should no longer be tested for HIV infection.)
  - Adjustment of status (AOS). After the alien has a labor certification and has been provisionally allocated a visa number, the final step is to change his or her status to permanent residency. Adjustment of status is submitted to USCIS via form I-485, Application to Register Permanent Residence or Adjust Status. If an immigrant visa number is available, the USCIS will allow "concurrent filing": it will accept forms I-140 and I-485 submitted in the same package or will accept form I-485 even before the approval of the I-140.
  - Consular processing. This is an alternative to AOS, but still requires the immigrant visa petition to be completed. The Form I-485 is not used. In the past (pre-2005), this process was somewhat faster than applying for AOS, so was sometimes used to circumvent long backlogs (of over two years in some cases). However, due to recent efficiency improvements by the USCIS, it is not clear whether applying via consular processing is faster than the regular AOS process. Consular processing is also thought to be riskier since there is no or very little recourse for appeal if the officer denies the application.

== Related forms ==
Of the USCIS immigration forms, the following are most closely related to Form I-140:

- Form I-129, Petition for a Nonimmigrant Worker, is used for nonimmigrant workers.
- Form I-130, Petition for Alien Relative, is the other main form that is the first step to immigrant status. It is used for the immigration of relatives of United States citizens and lawful permanent residents.
- Form I-360 and Form I-526 are the forms used for the EB-4 (religious worker and special immigrant) and EB-5 (investor/entrepreneur) categories.
- Form I-765 is the form used to apply for an Employment Authorization Document. Unlike the forms above, it is not a petition but an application made directly by the person seeking the EAD. Form I-765 cannot be used to immigrate to the United States or change one's non-immigrant status but rather is used by those in the United States on various statuses (such as students on F visas or eligible DACA applicants) to be able to work. The EAD classification is not tied to any particular employer and gives the worker the flexibility to choose any employer, possibly subject to constraints about the nature of work or the number of hours worked. For instance, F visa holding students receive an EAD for post-completion Optional Practical Training. The key difference between Forms I-129 and I-765 is that the former is filed by the employer and is associated with a specific job whereas the latter is filed by the employee and is not tied to a particular job.
