= Bettina May =

Canadian-American pin-up model and burlesque dancer (born 1979)

Bettina May (born February 28, 1979) is a Canadian born pin-up model, burlesque dancer and photographer currently living in Brooklyn, New York.

== Career ==
May started her pin-up modeling career in 2003 as one of the first Western Canadian models for Los Angeles–based modern pin-up website SuicideGirls.com and started burlesque dancing that same year. She appeared in Episode 31 of HBO's RealSex TV show on the Rebirth of Modern Pinup and was also a dancer in the Probot music video "Shake Your Blood" featuring Dave Grohl and Lemmy Kilmister. She made US immigration history in August 2012 by earning a green card with the "Alien Of Extraordinary Ability" classification based on her work in burlesque and pin-up modeling. She has toured the US and Europe extensively, and has appeared in a number of newspapers and magazines, including The New York Times, New York Post, Shimmy Magazine, and Dynamite Magazine in Germany.

She designs her own line of vintage-inspired vegan accessories, which has been worn by celebrities like Dita Von Teese and Bernie Dexter, called Coquette Faux Furriers.

She also teaches classes on vintage pin-up styling and posing, which she photographs as well. The class was turned into instructional videos / DVDs How to be a Pinup Model: Release your inner bombshell! and Bombshell Basics: Pinup Modeling Secrets Revealed and has been featured on NBC News and The New York Times.
