= O visa =

Non-immigratory temporary working visa for the United States

An O visa is a classification of non-immigrant temporary worker visa granted by the United States to an alien "who possesses extraordinary ability in the sciences, arts, education, business, or athletics, or who has a demonstrated record of extraordinary achievement in the motion picture or television industry and has been recognized nationally or internationally for those achievements", and to certain assistants and immediate family members of such aliens.

According to United States Citizenship and Immigration Services, there are three types of O visas:

- O-1A: individuals with an extraordinary ability in the sciences, education, business, or athletics (not including the arts, motion pictures or television industry)
- O-1B: individuals with an extraordinary ability in the arts or extraordinary achievement in motion picture or television industry.
- O-2: individuals who will accompany an O-1, artist or athlete, to assist in a specific event or performance. "For an O-1A, the O-2's assistance must be an 'integral part' of the O-1A's activity. For an O-1B, the O-2's assistance must be 'essential' to the completion of the O-1B's production. The O-2 worker has critical skills and experience with the O-1 that cannot be readily performed by a U.S. worker and which are essential to the successful performance of the O-1."
- O-3: individuals who are the spouse or children of O-1s and O-2s.

An O-1 visa is initially granted for up to three years. Subsequently, it can be extended for one year at a time. There is no limit to the number of extensions that may be granted. The term "O-1" refers to 8 U.S.C. § 1101(O)(i), added by section 207(a) of the Immigration Act of 1990, which provides for the admission of "aliens of extraordinary ability" in the stated fields. Spouses and dependent children of O-1 visa holders do not receive the status, but instead qualify for O-3 visas.

The O-1 visa legislation was drafted in 1990 by Representative Bruce Morrison of Connecticut.

== Requirements ==
The O-1 visa application must be submitted along with a petition submitted by a US Petitioner. This includes information regarding the petitioner and evidence documenting the alien's extraordinary ability, details of the proposed work in the U.S. in the form of an itinerary, supporting contracts that collate with the itinerary, and evidence of past work that confirms alien's extraordinary status is true and valid. It also must include an advisory letter from a US established person in the alien's appropriate industry field. This person is generally required to possess more than ten years in said field and is well known and respected among peers. The petition is to be approved for the duration of the event in which the alien will participate, for a maximum of three years. One-year extensions are permitted thereafter with no maximum cumulative duration.

Generally, to qualify for O-1A classification, aliens of extraordinary ability in the sciences, education, business, or athletics must demonstrate sustained national or international acclaim and recognition for achievements in the field of expertise by providing evidence of:

Receipt of a major, internationally recognized award, such as the Nobel Prize; or at least three of the following forms of documentation:

1. Documentation of the individual's receipt of nationally or internationally recognized prizes or awards for excellence in the field of endeavor;
2. Documentation of the individual's membership in associations in the field for which classification is sought, which require outstanding achievements of their members, as judged by recognized national or international experts in their disciplines or fields;
3. Published material in professional or major trade publications or major media about the individual, relating to the individual's work in the field for which classification is sought, which shall include the title, date, and author of such published material, and any necessary translation;
4. Evidence of the individual's participation on a panel, or individually, as a judge of the work of others in the same or in an allied field of specialization to that for which classification is sought;
5. Evidence of the individual's original scientific, scholarly, or business-related contributions of major significance in the field;
6. Evidence of the individual's authorship of scholarly articles in the field, in professional journals, or other major media;
7. Evidence that the individual has been employed in a critical or essential capacity for organizations and establishments that have a distinguished reputation;
8. Evidence that the individual has either commanded a high salary or will command a high salary or other remuneration for services, evidenced by contracts or other reliable evidence.

To qualify for an O-1A visa, an applicant must provide documents proving extraordinary ability. Examples of proof of extraordinary ability include nationally or internationally recognized prizes or awards for excellence, membership in associations requiring outstanding achievements, and articles written by or about the applicant. To supplement these materials, employer may submit letters signed by experts in the applicant's field attesting to the applicant's extraordinary ability in that field.

To qualify for O-1B classification, the applicant will need to supply documents showing that he or she has been nominated for or have received significant national or international awards or prizes in the particular field, such as an Emmy, Grammy, Oscar, or Tony Award. Alternately, the employer filing the petition can submit at least three of the following forms of documentation:

1. Has performed services as a lead or starring participant in productions or events with distinguished reputations as shown by critical reviews, ads, publicity releases, publications, contract or endorsements;
2. National or international recognition for achievements through critical reviews, other published materials by or about the beneficiary in major trade papers, trade journals, magazines, and so forth;
3. Has performed in a lead, starring or critical role for organizations and establishments that have a distinguished reputation evidenced by media articles, testimonials, and similar write-ups;
4. Has a record of major commercial or critically acclaimed success;
5. Has achieved significant recognition from organizations, critics, government agencies and recognized experts;
6. Has commanded or will command a high salary or other remuneration in comparison to others in the field.

For extraordinary ability in motion picture or television, the definition of "extraordinary" is different. For these individuals, "extraordinary achievement" is defined as "a very high level of accomplishment in the motion picture or television industry evidenced by a degree of skill and recognition substantially above that ordinarily encountered to the extent that the person is recognized as outstanding, leading, or well-known in the motion picture or television field."

Before an O-1 visa can be granted, the applicant must go through a special consultation process. The applicant must get an "advisory opinion" from a peer group, a group of professionals in the alien's occupation or profession, or from a union, labor, or management organization. An "advisory opinion" is a letter from an organization stating that the position the alien applicant will hold requires extraordinary ability.

The peer group must provide a written opinion to the USCIS. If the application does not include a peer group opinion, the USCIS will attempt to contact a peer group directly. If no peer group exists, the USCIS will make a decision without a peer group consultation.

The USCIS will not require a new consultation if the alien beneficiary is reentering the U.S. in the O-1 category within two years of a previous peer group consultation. Unlike the EB1-Extraordinary Ability category, the O-1 category requires employment and sponsorship by the employer.

Consultation with an appropriate peer group, labor and/or management organization regarding the nature of the proposed work and the beneficiary's qualifications is mandatory before an O-1 petition can be approved. This requirement may be especially important in the arts, entertainment fields, or athletics.

An O-1 artist can be sponsored by a U.S. employer, U.S. agent, or a foreign employer through a U.S. agent. Although the artist cannot petition for him/herself for O-1 status, the regulations recognize that O-1 cases can involve workers who are traditionally self-employed.

== Statistics ==
=== Number of visas issued by year ===
In the table below, the years are Fiscal Years, so for instance the year 2009 refers to the period from October 1, 2008, to September 30, 2009. Note that this only counts O visas issued at embassies and consulates outside the United States, and not transitions to O status within the United States via Form I-129. Also, since a single person may need to renew his or her O visa, it is not an estimate of the number of people currently in the status.

Year	Number of O-1 visas issued	Number of O-2 visas issued	Number of O-3 visas issued	Total
1997	3345	1848	748	5941
1998	4257	1778	1056	7091
1999	5009	2185	1480	8674
2000	6466	1894	2101	10461
2001	6666	1918	2287	10871
2002	6026	1972	1760	9758
2003	6126	2472	1552	10150
2004	6437	2611	1679	10727
2005	6712	3387	1861	11960
2006	6961	3726	1912	12599
2007	7653	4218	2238	14109
2008	9014	5054	2642	16710
2009	9368	4702	2396	16466
2010	8589	4435	1929	14953
2011	8828	4863	2052	15743
2012	10590	5357	2396	18343
2013	12359	6623	3098	22080
2014	12706	6251	3473	22430
2015	13865	5792	4023	23680
2016	15918	7417	4836	28171
2017	17011	8053	4974	30038
2018	16904	8432	4923	30259
2019	17751	8743	5337	31831
2020	8838	3919	2658	15415
2021	7294	2870	2838	13002
2022	19102	11586	6234	36922
2023	18994	13335	6453	38782
2024	19457	13922	6035	39414

=== Number by region ===
Year	Africa	Asia	Europe	North America	Oceania	South America	Total (Note: The number includes individuals who have no nationality; typically, there are no more than a half dozen of them.)	Ref
2000	222	2273	5888	641	456	980	10461	
2005	253	2342	6295	1377	544	1146	11960	
2010	246	2924	7944	1390	764	1684	14953	
2015	379	4061	13245	1804	1292	2898	23680	
2020	310	3312	7803	1154	742	2088	15415	
2024	1105	10029	15726	5337	1383	5834	39414	

== Notable recipients ==
- Alfio, Australian-Italian tenor and songwriter
- Iggy Azalea, Australian rapper, songwriter, model and businesswoman
- Justin Bieber, Canadian singer-songwriter
- Arkadi Duchin, Israeli singer-songwriter
- Caro Emerald, Dutch pop and jazz singer
- Boy George, British singer-songwriter
- Terry George, Irish screenwriter and director
- Eyal Golan, Israeli singer
- Gabriela Isler, Venezuelan fashion model and winner of Miss Venezuela 2012 and Miss Universe 2013
- Reona Ito, Japanese orchestral conductor
- Ana Ivanovic, Serbian tennis player
- Amrit Kaur, Canadian actress
- Jamal Khashoggi, Saudi dissident journalist
- Katerina Ksenyeva, Russian actress, singer, composer and journalist
- Julia Lang, German-Tanzanian creative director, image consultant and entrepreneur
- Katherine Langford, Australian actress
- Yasmin Le Bon, British supermodel
- Andrew Lloyd Webber, English musical theatre composer
- Alicia Malone, Australian author and television host for Turner Classic Movies
- Jay Malone, Canadian comedian
- Damian McGinty, Irish singer and actor
- Tony Michaelides, British music industry executive
- Mubarak Muyika, Kenyan-American founder of tech ventures Hype Century and Zagace Inc.
- Ximena Navarrete, Mexican actress and model who won Miss Universe 2010
- Kazuha Oda, Japanese singer-songwriter
- Liam Payne, English singer-songwriter
- Pelé, Brazilian professional footballer
- Jonathan Sacks, former Chief Rabbi of the United Kingdom
- Robert Sher-Machherndl, Dutch choreographer and ballet dancer
- Subliminal, Israeli hip-hop artist
- Arevik Tserunyan, Armenian artist
- Milo Yiannopoulos, British far-right political commentator
- Darshan Magdum (Boy Throb), Indian singer and social media influencer

=== Notable unsuccessful applicants ===
- Dorismar, Argentine model, actress, television hostess, and singer
- Lady Saw, Jamaican singer-songwriter
