= Bernard Wolfsdorf =

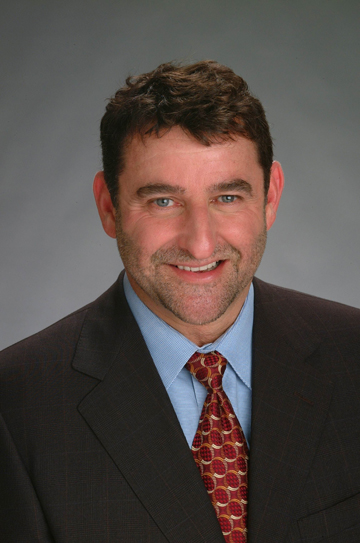
Bernard P. Wolfsdorf

Bernard P. Wolfsdorf is an American immigration lawyer, and former President of the American Immigration Lawyers Association (AILA). He is a co-founder and the Managing Partner of Wolfsdorf Rosenthal LLP, with 10 offices worldwide, including those located in Boston, Denver, Los Angeles, New York, Oakland, San Diego, San Francisco, Santa Monica, and Shanghai.

Born in South Africa, he immigrated to the United States in the early 1980s, and focuses on immigration law. He has published many professional articles on U.S. immigration and has lectured at national and international conferences in the field. He is an avid surfer.

== Kazarian Decision ==
In 2009, Wolfsdorf successfully petitioned the U.S. Court of Appeals in the 9th Circuit in the matter of Kazarian v. USCIS, a landmark in the struggle for immigration reform for extraordinary scientists and outstanding researchers. The 9th Circuit Court of Appeals decided that USCIS may not “unilaterally impose novel substantive or evidentiary requirements beyond those set forth [in the law].”

== Awards ==
The International Who’s Who of Business Lawyers has recognized Wolfsdorf as the "Global Corporate Immigration Lawyer of the Year" in the Who's Who Legal Awards on three separate occasions, in 2010, 2011, and 2012. Who's Who Legal Awards are given to only the leading lawyers in each field, and are based exclusively on the results of an independent research process that encompasses feedback from private practitioners, clients, and other experts in the sector.

Wolfsdorf has been selected as one of California's Top 100 Lawyers by the professional association Super Lawyers each year from 2006-2012. Super Lawyers is a rating service of outstanding lawyers from more than 70 practice areas who have attained a high degree of peer recognition and professional achievement. The selection process is multi-phased and includes independent research, peer nominations, and peer evaluation.

The peer-reviewed legal guidebook Chambers and Partners has listed Wolfsdorf Immigration Law Group as a "top-tier law firm" in the immigration sector in both 2011 and 2012. Additionally, in 2012, Chambers named Wolfsdorf a "star individual," a designation given to individuals with exceptional recommendations in their field. Established in 1990, Chambers assembles its rankings through extensive interviews with highly regarded professionals and commercial users of legal services in each respective field.

In 2011 the American Immigration Lawyers Association (AILA) presented Wolfsdorf with its Service Excellence Award. He has been recognized as one of the nation's Top 10 Immigration Lawyers by Human Resource Executive magazine. Wolfsdorf Rosenthal LLP also earned a "First-Tier Ranking" in the U.S. News - Best Lawyers "Best Law Firms" 2011-2012 edition.
