= Form I-130 =

American immigration document

Form I-130, Petition for Alien Relative, 2015

Form I-130, Petition for Alien Relative is a form submitted to the United States Citizenship and Immigration Services (or, in the rare case of Direct Consular Filing, to a US consulate or embassy abroad) by a United States citizen or Lawful Permanent Resident petitioning for an immediate or close relative (who is not currently a United States citizen or lawful permanent resident) intending to immigrate to the United States. It is one of numerous USCIS immigration forms. As with all USCIS petitions, the person who submits the petition is called the petitioner and the relative on whose behalf the petition is made is called the beneficiary. The USCIS officer who evaluates the petition is called the adjudicator.

Approval of the petition can be used by the beneficiary to obtain a United States visa in the Immediate Relative (IR) or Family-Based Preference (F) category at a US consulate or embassy abroad, and, once the relative has immigrated to the United States, to obtain a Green Card (i.e., become a Lawful Permanent Resident). For relatives already present in the United States it can be used for Adjustment of Status to that of Lawful Permanent Resident.

For petitions filed by United States citizens, each I-130 petition can be on behalf of only one beneficiary, so a petitioner seeking to petition for multiple relatives (for instance, a spouse and children) must file separate I-130s for each of them. For lawful permanent residents, an exception is made in the case for the beneficiary's unmarried children.

== Types of relationship between petitioner and beneficiary ==
Form I-130 can be used for the following categories of relatives:

- Immediate Relative (IR): This category is not numerically limited, and includes the following subcategories:
  - IR-1: Spouse of a US citizen. Need to be married for at least two years.
  - IR-2: Unmarried child under 21 of a U.S. citizen, provided the marriage to the biological parent occurred before the child was 18, and at least two years prior to obtaining the visa.
  - IR-5: Parent of a U.S. citizen who is at least 21 years old.
- Family Preference (F) (not to be confused with F visa, the student visa in the US):
  - F1 (First Preference): Unmarried sons and daughters of U.S. citizens (F1-1).
  - F2 (Second Preference): Spouses (F2-1), minor children (F2-2), and unmarried sons and daughters (age 21 and over) of Lawful Permanent Residents (F2-4).
  - F3 (Third Preference): Married sons and daughters of U.S. citizens (F3-1).
  - F4 (Fourth Preference): Brothers and sisters of U.S. citizens (F4-1).
- Conditional Resident (CR):
  - CR-1: Spouse, married for less than two years. Path to temporary residence that can be converted to permanent residence within two years of moving.
  - CR-2: Unmarried child under 21 of a U.S. citizen, provided the marriage to the biological parent occurred before the child was 18, and less than two years prior to obtaining the visa.

There are two subcategories of the IR category for which Form I-130 is not the appropriate form: IR-3 (orphan adopted abroad by a U.S. citizen) and IR-4 (orphan to be adopted in the U.S. by a U.S. citizen). For these categories, the appropriate forms are I-600 and I-600A (if the orphan is from a non-Hague Convention country) and I-800 and I-800A (if the orphan is from a Hague Convention country).

There are some subcategories of the F category that cannot be specified on Form I-130: these include the minor children of those in the F1-1 category, and the spouses and minor children of those in the F3-1 and F4-1 categories.

Note that Form I-130 cannot be used to obtain approval for K visas for fiancé(e)s. The appropriate form for that purpose is Form I-129F, Petition for Alien Fiancé(e).

== Relation with the overall immigrant visa process ==
While there is only one Form I-130, there are three different ways the form could be used:

1. The case that both the petitioner (a United States citizen or lawful permanent resident) and beneficiary are both legally present in the United States, with the beneficiary in a long-term non-immigrant status (such as a student or temporary worker status; in particular, this method does not usually apply if the beneficiary is temporarily in the United States on a B visa): In this case, the filing of Form I-130 can be combined with other steps in either of two ways:
  - Two-step filing (allowed for all categories): The petitioner files Form I-130, and after it is approved, the beneficiary's name is added to a queue of people awaiting immigrant visas. After a wait time (that depends on the category), the beneficiary's adjustment of status application is ready to be processed and the beneficiary files Form I-485 to adjust status to that of a Permanent Resident.
  - One-step filing (this can always be used for the IR category, for which there are no numerical limits, but it can also be used for the F category if the priority date for the beneficiary's country of chargeability is current, i.e., there are no wait times for visa numbers): Form I-130 is filed by the petitioner and Form I-485 is filed by the beneficiary concurrently. The USCIS handles both petitions together, with the Form I-130 and Form I-485 processed at a Service Center and the final determination for the Form I-485 being done at a field office (where the petitioner and beneficiary are called for an interview). Note that the final adjustment of status can be done only after a visa number becomes available for the beneficiary.
2. The case that the beneficiary relative is outside the United States: In this case, Form I-130 (also called the standalone Form I-130 to distinguish it from the previous case) is the first of a three-step process. The remaining two steps are:
  - The National Visa Center adds the beneficiary's name to a queue of people awaiting immigrant visas. After a wait time (that varies based on the category), the beneficiary is granted a visa number. Note that IR visas are not subject to numerical limits, whereas F visas are, but both go through the NVC.
  - The beneficiary can use the visa number to apply for a visa at the United States embassy or consulate abroad.
3. The case that the petitioner is a United States citizen who has been living abroad continuously for at least six months, along with the beneficiary: In this case, the petitioner may be able to opt for Direct Consular Filing.

Note that for the F category, that has numerical limits, the numerical limits that apply depend both on the category and country of chargeability. Moreover, the order of priority of applications is determined by the date the original Form I-130 petition was received by the USCIS, known as the Priority Date. The Visa Bulletin, published by the Visa Reporting and Control Division of the U.S. Department of State, provides cut-off dates for each category. If the Priority Date is earlier than the cut-off date, then the beneficiary can get an immigrant visa or apply for Adjustment of Status.

=== Legal Immigration Family Equity Act provisions related to Form I-130 ===
The Legal Immigration Family Equity Act has provisions targeting beneficiaries of pending or approved Form I-130 petitions. One provision specifically addresses overlooking of unlawful entry or presence for people who otherwise qualify for Adjustment of Status based on a Form I-130 petition filed on or before April 30, 2001. The other two main provisions address the issue of visas and change of non-immigrant status for people who have filed Form I-130 petitions but have still not been able to get visas or adjust status to that of Lawful Permanent Resident.

== Filing details ==
=== Forms submitted alongside ===
The following forms may be submitted alongside Form I-130:

- Form I-130A (required when petitioning for spouse), by the beneficiary spouse, providing their biographical information (no additional cost).
- Form G-1145, requesting e-notification of acceptance (optional, free).

=== Addresses ===
All (non-DCF) applications from outside the United States, as well as all applications with a concurrent Form I-485 (adjustment of status) must be filed with the Chicago lockbox facility. Standalone Form I-130s need to be filed at either the Chicago or the Phoenix lockbox facility, where the choice of facility is determined by the home address of the petitioner used on the form. DCF applications need to be filed at the appropriate U.S. embassy or consulate abroad.

=== Filing fees ===
As of 2024, the filing fee for Form I-130 is $675 by mail or $625 by their website. There are no filing fees for the accompanying forms that need to be filed along with this form (I-130A and G-1145). However, this fee does not include:

- In the case the beneficiary is already in the United States, the fee for Form I-485 (filed separately by the beneficiary, so not part of the petition), which can range from $750 to $1140 depending on the category, plus an $85 biometrics fee.
- In the case the beneficiary is not in the United States, the immigrant visa application processing fee that, as of May 2015, is $325.
- In the case the beneficiary is not in the United States, the $220 USCIS immigrant fee, which is needed to process the immigrant visa packet and produce and send to the applicant the Green Card.

== Statistics ==
=== Rate of petitions, approvals, and denials ===
The USCIS releases statistics on a quarterly basis giving information on the number of applications received, approved, denied, and pending in that quarter. Here is the approximate data in most quarters:

Category	Number of petitions received	Number of petitions approved	Number of petitions denied	Number of petitions pending
Immediate Relative	125,000–150,000	125,000–150,000	5,000–10,000	250,000–300,000
Other categories (F, CR)	50,000–65,000	65,000–75,000	5,000–15,000	450,000–550,000
Total	175,000–215,000	190,000–225,000	10,000–25,000	700,000–850,000

The USCIS data on the number of petitions received, accepted, denied, and pending is broken down by service center and field office location.

=== Processing times ===
USCIS processes Form I-130 on a first-come, first-served basis, so at any given time, the date received for the forms that have just finished processing provides a good estimate of processing time. USCIS makes this information available by a combination of form type and service center/field office on its website, and updates the information in the middle of every month, with a lag of 45 days for data quality auditing and control (so for instance the information posted on January 15 will provide processing times and dates as of approximately November 30). USCIS' target processing time for Form I-130 is 5 months, and if the date of the most recently processed form is 5 months or less it simply reports "5 months" otherwise it reports the date (to get the actual processing time, you need to see how far back that date is relative to the date for which the processing times and dates are reported). USCIS breaks down Form I-130 into six categories and reports processing times separately for each:

- Permanent resident filling for a spouse or child under 21
- U.S. citizen filing for a spouse, parent, or child under 21
- U.S. citizen filing for an unmarried son or daughter over 21
- Permanent resident filling for an unmarried son or daughter over 21
- U.S. citizen filing for a married son or daughter over 21
- U.S. citizen filing for a brother or sister

Processing times have in the past gone as low as 9 months according to the USCIS' own estimates, and to as high as 15 months according to the New York Times, with the temporary increase attributed to the increased workload on the USCIS arising from the introduction of the Deferred Action for Childhood Arrivals program announced in June 2012.

Note that these processing times do not include wait times for visa numbers in the case of Form I-130 petitions in the numerically limited F category, which can be quite long in some cases. Also, they do not include the additional time spent processing the Form I-485 at the Field Office (in case the beneficiary is in the United States and applying for Adjustment of Status) or the additional time taken to obtain an immigrant visa after an immigrant visa number is obtained (in the case the beneficiary is not currently in the United States).

For petitions filed with USCIS international offices using Direct Consular Filing, the relevant processing time is that of the international office rather than of a US service center.

== Constraints on beneficiary ==
While the Form I-130 is pending or after it has been approved and the beneficiary is waiting for an immigrant visa number, the beneficiary is not forbidden from traveling to and from the United States.

However, if the beneficiary is currently outside the United States and does not have a visa to enter the United States, it may be difficult to obtain a non-immigrant visa because the pending Form I-130 is an indicator of future immigrant intent. The beneficiary may still be able to obtain a B visa by convincing the consular officer that the current visit is temporary. Moreover, those who enter on a temporary business/tourist visa are generally not allowed to transition to a permanent resident status, and trying to file Form I-485 while on a temporary tourist status can risk inadmissibility bars.

== Adverse decisions ==
=== Initial response ===
The initial response from the USCIS to a Form I-130 is one of these four:

- Approval
- Denial
- Request For Evidence (RFE): Generally, evidence is requested about the relationship between the petitioner and beneficiary. For instance, for marriage-based petitions (where one spouse is petitioning for another) evidence that the marriage actually occurred, and that there was no marriage fraud, is sought.
- Notice of Intent to Deny (NOID): This is an advance notice that the petition is likely to be denied, along with reasons for the proposed denial. The petitioner is given a limited amount of time to respond. One reason for issuing a NOID is that it is believed that the petitioner or beneficiary has committed marriage fraud in the past.

In the case of a RFE or NOID, the petitioner's response will be taken into account by the USCIS when deciding whether to approve or deny the petition.

=== Concurrent filing: Stokes interview case ===
In case 1, where the beneficiary is already in the United States and the Form I-130 is filed concurrently with the Form I-485, the petitioner and beneficiary are initially interviewed jointly by a USCIS officer. If, based on the joint interview or other reasons, the USCIS officer is suspicious about the petition, he or she may require a Stokes interview, where the petitioner and beneficiary are interviewed separately about their relationship and the responses of both are compared. The Stokes interview is generally used for marriage petitions (IR-1 and F2-1).

=== Standalone filing: revocation of petition and Notice of Intent to Revoke ===
Based on new evidence suggesting that the original petition was fraudulent, the USCIS may issue a revocation of petition (i.e., revoke the petition entirely) or send the petitioner a Notice of Intent to Revoke, to which the petitioner may respond with additional evidence or challenge the reasons. The typical impetus for the USCIS to reconsider an approved petition is when a United States consular officer evaluating the beneficiary's visa application based on the petition encounters evidence suggesting that the petition was fraudulent. If the consular office finds such evidence, he or she returns the petition to USCIS along with the reasons the petition appears fraudulent, and issues a Section 221(g) quasi-refusal to the applicant (note that this is relevant to cases 2 and 3, and not to case 1 where the beneficiary is already in the United States). The following are worth noting:

- A consular officer may reject the beneficiary's visa application without returning the petition to the USCIS. This is because the consular officer has many potential grounds for rejecting the application without calling the legitimacy of the petition in question. For instance, the consular officer may reject the application using Section 214(b), failure to establish non-immigrant intent. The officer may also, as in the case of Kerry v. Din (2015), reject the beneficiary's visa application on claims of connections to terrorism, without the legitimacy of the Form I-130 approval being called in question.
- After the consular officer returns the petition to the USCIS, the USCIS may decide that the petition is valid and tell the consular officer that. if the USCIS revalidates the petition, then the consular officer must use this information and proceed with the same visa application (i.e., the beneficiary need not re-apply for a visa).

=== Appeals process ===
Appeals for Form I-130 (both denial and revocation) are handled by the Board of Immigration Appeals (BIA). BIA is part of the Executive Office for Immigration Review, which is under the United States Department of Justice, a separate federal government agency from USCIS' parent, the U.S. Department of Homeland Security. A petitioner who believes that his or her petition was incorrectly denied or revoked can file Form EOIR-29 with the USCIS to have an appeal heard by the BIA.

This is in contrast with the appeals process for the vast majority of USCIS immigration forms is handled by the USCIS's Administrative Appeals Office, with which the petitioner is required to file Form I-290B.

In case of an unfavorable BIA decision, the petitioner can appeal the decision in the United States judicial system. This is supported by the 1946 Administrative Procedure Act, that states that United States citizens and residents adversely affected by government agencies can appeal the decisions in the judicial system.

The USCIS does not handle appeals for denials and revocations of visa applications based on approved USCIS petitions. Due to the doctrine of consular nonreviewability, visa denials and revocations can generally not be appealed in the United States judicial system, though there are some exceptions.

== Related forms ==
- Form I-129F, Petition for Alien Fiancé(e), is similar, but does not grant permanent resident status. Rather, it is used to obtain nonimmigrant K visas (that differ from most nonimmigrant visas in that they can be obtained despite immigrant intent).
- Forms I-360 and I-600 are the two other forms that are eligible for Direct Consular Filing in some cases.
- Form I-140 is the other main form that grants immigrant status, and that has a similar process going via the National Visa Center.
