= Request for Evidence =

A Request for Evidence (RFE) is a request issued by the United States Citizenship and Immigration Services to petitioners for residency, citizenship, family visas, and employment visas. Examples of petitions for which a RFE may be issued are Form I-129 (alien worker authorization), Form I-140 (immigrant worker authorization), and Form I-130 (family visas).

The RFE is intended for use in cases where the adjudicator (the person evaluating the petition) believes that there is not enough evidence to approve the petition, but also believes that the petition may be redeemable, and that there is no clear factual or statutory basis for denial.

The RFE, when used, should be as clear as possible about what types of additional evidence are needed to fill in the gap, and what inconsistencies or problems have been found in the evidence submitted so far. It is not intended for use for the adjudicator's reassurance in cases where there is enough evidence to approve the petition. It is sent to, and the response must be sent by, the petitioner (or the attorney representing the petitioner, in cases where the petition is filed through an attorney) rather than the beneficiary.

== Related communications ==
=== Differences with NOID ===
The following are some key differences between the RFE and the Notice of Intent to Deny (NOID):

- Likelihood of denial: The RFE is issued when there is significant uncertainty about whether the petition will be approved, whereas the NOID is generally used when a denial is quite likely.
- Accompanying information: A RFE comes with a list of additional types of evidence needed. A NOID comes equipped with a list of reasons for denial. While the two lists are somewhat related (insofar as a reason for denial translates to a piece of evidence that could overturn the denial) they have different framings.
- Time given to respond: The time given to respond to a RFE is generally greater than that for a NOID.

=== Request for clarification ===
In cases where the USCIS simply needs answers to a few specific questions (such as a complete translation), it simply issues a Request for Clarification instead of a RFE.

== Types of evidence requested ==
RFEs typically request one or more of the following types of evidence:

- ability of employer to pay
- periods of current or prior stay in the United States
- prior work experience
- educational details or evaluation
- documents supporting claims of exceptional ability or outstanding research

== Response protocol ==
The time within which the response to a RFE must be sent is indicated on the RFE. It generally varies between 30 and 90 days. If no response is received within the time indicated on the RFE, the USCIS will process the application without considering the additional evidence, which in most cases means a denial (because petitions where there was enough evidence to accept should not have RFEs in the first place).

The petitioner has only one chance to respond to a RFE,

- The petitioner can submit all the requested evidence.
- The petitioner can "partially respond" by submitting some of the requested evidence. The USCIS will use the partial submission along with the earlier submission to evaluate the petition.
- The petitioner can choose not to respond, so a final decision will be based on the original petition. This usually means a denial.
- The petitioner can withdraw the petition.

When responding to a RFE, the petitioner may attach additional pieces of evidence over and above those explicitly requested in the RFE.

== Relation with processing timeline ==
The expected processing time for petitions is generally defined as the time till an approval, denial, RFE, or NOID is issued. Therefore, the time taken while waiting for a response from the petitioner is not counted as part of the processing time. After the petitioner responds, the expected additional processing time is comparable with the processing time for a complete first application.

For petitions that request the Premium Processing Service, the expected processing time to a first response (approval, denial, RFE, or NOID) is 15 days, and the time after receiving a response to the RFE is another 15 days.

== See also ==
- Notice of Intent to Deny
- Notice of Intent to Revoke
