= Notice of Intent to Deny =

A Notice of Intent to Deny (NOID) is a notice issued by the United States Citizenship and Immigration Services to petitioners for residency, citizenship, family visas, and employment visas. Examples of petitions for which a NOID may be issued are Form I-129 (alien worker authorization), Form I-140 (immigrant worker authorization), and Form I-130 (family visas).

== Situations where it is used ==
The NOID is used for situations where the adjudicator (the person evaluating the petition) believes that the petition should be denied, but that the petitioner may have additional evidence that might lead the petition to be approved. Its main use is to save the petitioner and the USCIS time and effort involved in dealing with denials (through re-petitioning or appeal).

== Response protocol ==
The NOID is sent to, and the response must be sent by, the petitioner (or the attorney representing the petitioner, in cases where the petition is filed through an attorney) rather than the beneficiary.

The NOID is accompanied by stated reasons for issuing the NOID (which, if not addressed, will be the reasons for denial) and a time within which the petitioner must respond. If the petitioner submits no response, the petition is denied. If the petitioner responds, the additional evidence is considered prior to a final decision.

== Related communications ==
=== Differences with RFE ===
The following are some key differences between the Request For Evidence (RFE) and NOID:

- Likelihood of denial: The RFE is issued when there is significant uncertainty about whether the petition will be approved, whereas the NOID is generally used when a denial is quite likely.
- Accompanying information: A RFE comes with a list of additional types of evidence needed. A NOID comes equipped with a list of reasons for denial. While the two lists are somewhat related (insofar as a reason for denial translates to a piece of evidence that could overturn the denial) they have different framings.
- Time given to respond: The time given to respond to a RFE is generally greater than that for a NOID.

=== Differences with Notice of Intent to Revoke ===
Another communication similar to NOID is the Notice of Intent to Revoke, used in cases where the USCIS has received additional evidence after approving a petition and is reconsidering it for revocation. This is often prompted by a consular officer returning the petition to the USCIS. Consular officers return petitions to the USCIS if, in the course of deciding a visa application by the beneficiary based on the petition, they come across reason to believe that the petition was based on fraud or misrepresentation.
