= Form I-129 =

US immigration form

Form I-129, Petition for a Nonimmigrant Worker is a form submitted to the United States Citizenship and Immigration Services used by employers or prospective employers to obtain or amend the details of a worker on a nonimmigrant visa status. Form I-129 is used to either file for a new status or a change of status, such as new, continuing or changed employer or title; or an amendment to the original application. Approval of the form makes the worker eligible to start or continue working at the job (on or after the indicated start date) if already in the United States. If the worker is not already in the United States, an approved Form I-129 may be used to submit a visa application associated with that status. The form is 36 pages long (8 pages for the main form, and the remaining pages for various supplements not all of which may be applicable to every petition) and the instructions for the form are 29 pages long. It is one of the many USCIS immigration forms.

== Visa statuses for which the form is required or may be used ==
=== Visa statuses that require the form for initial employment as well as extension or change of status ===
For the following statuses, a Form I-129 must always be filed for initial employment as well as for extension of status or change to employment details:

Visa	Quick description	Supplements needed on Form I-129	Initial evidence needed (not an exhaustive list)	Multiple beneficiaries allowed on the single petition?
H-1B visa	Temporary workers for specialty occupations that require a bachelor's degree or equivalent	part of the H classification supplement (pages 13–14, 19–21)	Labor Condition Application approved by the U.S. Department of Labor Employment & Training Administration Office of Foreign Labor Certification	No
H-1B2 visa	Exceptional services relating to a cooperative research and development project administrated by the U.S. Department of Defense	part of the H classification supplement		No
H-1B3 visa	Fashion model of prominence	part of the H classification supplement	Labor Condition Application approved by the U.S. Department of Labor Employment & Training Administration Office of Foreign Labor Certification	No
H-2A visa	Temporary agricultural workers	part of the H classification supplement (pages 13–17)	H-2A Temporary Labor Certification (TLC) obtained from the U.S. Department of Labor Employment & Training Administration Office of Foreign Labor Certification	Yes
H-2B visa	Temporary non-agricultural workers for non-specialty occupations	part of the H classification supplement (pages 13–17)	H-2B Temporary Labor Certification (TLC) obtained from the U.S. Department of Labor Employment & Training Administration Office of Foreign Labor Certification	Yes
H-3 visa	Temporary visa for trainees or special education workers who intend to perform their eventual job outside the United States	part of the H classification supplement (page 13, first line of page 14, page 18)		Yes
L-1 visa	Temporary visa for employees at companies with both US and foreign offices	L classification supplement (pages 22–25)		No
O visas (O-1, O-2)	O-1: Temporary visa for an employee who possesses extraordinary ability in the sciences, arts, education, business, or athletics, or who has a demonstrated record of extraordinary achievement in the motion picture or television industry. O-2: Temporary visa for somebody who assists an O-1 athlete or artist	O and P classification supplement (pages 26–28)	Consultation opinion	Only for O-2
P visas (P-1, P-1S, P-2, P-2S, P-3, P-3S)	Temporary visa for individual or team athletes (P-1), or artists or entertainers who are part of a reciprocal exchange (P-2) or culturally unique (P-3) program. Visas for people providing support to these are called P-1S, P-2S, and P-3S respectively	O and P classification supplement (pages 26–28)	Consultation opinions	Yes
Q-1 visa	International cultural exchange alien	Q classification supplement (page 29)		Yes
R-1 visa	Alien in a religious occupation	R classification supplement (pages 30–34)		No

=== Visa statuses that require the form only for change of status ===
For visa statuses associated with free trade agreements, a Form I-129 is needed only if the worker is transitioning status while within the United States. Workers who are outside the United States can directly apply for a visa based on their job offer and other supporting documents. The statuses include:

Visa	Countries it applies to	Corresponding free trade agreement	Type of workers
E-1 visa	All treaty countries		Trader
E-2 visa	All treaty countries		Investor
E-3 visa	Australia	Australia-United States Free Trade Agreement	Worker, similar to the H-1B visa, but with much more flexibility with respect to switching jobs.
H-1B1 visa	Chile, Singapore	Chile-United States Free Trade Agreement, Singapore-United States Free Trade Agreement	Specialty occupations allowed for H-1B (that requires an undergraduate education or equivalent) plus some additional explicitly listed occupations
TN visa	Canada, Mexico	North American Free Trade Agreement	A narrow list of specialty occupations (more narrow than for the H-1B).

== Relation with visa process ==
For the visa classifications that require Form I-129, a person outside the United States needs to apply for the corresponding visa. The visa application must include an approved Form I-129 as well as other supporting documents necessary for the visa status.

For each of the classifications for which Form I-129 can be filed, there are associated visa classes for dependents (spouses and minor children), such as the H-4 visa for H visa holders and the O-3 visa for O visa holders. Those already present in the United States who want to transition to dependent status can file Form I-539 for change of status.

Whether an individual holds a single-entry or multiple-entry visa, the applicant may need to apply for visas multiple times if traveling outside the United States repeatedly. Each of these visa applications will rely on the same approved Form I-129 that is used as the basis for the worker's current work authorization; those who have already started employment may also need to submit additional proof showing that they have been working for the employer their status is associated with since the start date.

== Relation with other forms ==
- Form I-140 is a similar form filed by an employer or prospective employer for a worker for an employment-based visa (EB-1 visa, EB-2 visa or EB-3 visa). These employment-based visas are immigrant visas, and lead to Green Cards. The key difference between Forms I-140 and I-129 is that they are for immigrant and non-immigrant visas respectively.
- Form I-765 is the application form for non-immigrant workers to receive an Employment Authorization Document (EAD). Unlike the forms above, it is not a petition but an application made directly by the person seeking the EAD. Form I-765 cannot be used to immigrate to the United States or change one's non-immigrant status but rather is used by those in the United States on various statuses (such as students on F visas or eligible DACA applicants) to be able to work. The EAD classification is not tied to any particular employer and gives the worker the flexibility to choose any employer, possibly subject to constraints about the nature of work or the number of hours worked. For instance, F visa holding students receive an EAD for post-completion Optional Practical Training. The key difference between Forms I-129 and I-765 is that the former is filed by the employer and is associated with a specific job whereas the latter is filed by the employee and is not tied to a particular job.

Form I-129 is unrelated to Form I-129F, a form used by the fiancé(e)s of citizens and permanent residents to acquire fiancé(e) non-immigrant status, usually with the intention to file for Adjustment of Status after arriving in the United States.
