= DCF =

DCF may refer to:

== Medical ==
- Data clarification form in clinical trials
- Dénomination Commune Française, a formal French generic name for a drug

== Organizations ==
- Child protective services, called Department of Children and Families in some U.S. states
  - Connecticut Department of Children and Families
  - Florida Department of Children and Families
  - Vermont Department for Children and Families
  - Wisconsin Department of Children and Families
- DCF Advertising, an American advertising agency
- Delaware Community Foundation, a charitable organization
- Dominion Car and Foundry, a former Canadian railcar maker
- Donors Capital Fund, a Virginia-based donor advised charity

== Science ==
- Dichlorofluorescein, a fluorescent dye
- Differentially closed fields
- L-dopachrome isomerase, also called dopachrome conversion factor

== Technology ==
- DCF77, time signal radio station in Germany.
- Design rule for Camera File system, file system specification for digital cameras
- Device Configuration File, an element of the CANopen communication protocol
- Distributed coordination function, WLAN technique
- Double-clad fiber
- Document Composition Facility, IBM software
- Dyneema Composite Fabric, a high-performance non-woven composite material used in high-strength, low-weight applications

== Other uses ==
- Canefield Airport, Roseau, Dominica (IATA airport code)
- Dallas Christmas Festival
- Discounted cash flow, in financial analysis
- Direct Consular Filing, process related to immigration, US
- Dorothy Canfield Fisher Children's Book Award, Vermont, US
- Supervised injection site, also called drug consumption facility
