= D-dopachrome decarboxylase =

Identifiers
- EC no.: 4.1.1.84
- CAS no.: 184111-06-6

Databases
- BRENDA: enzyme data
- ExPASy: NiceZyme view
- KEGG: enzyme entry
- MetaCyc: metabolic pathway
- Rhea: reactions
- PDB structures: RCSB PDB PDBe PDBsum
Search
- PMC: articles
- PubMed: articles
- NCBI: proteins

The enzyme D-dopachrome decarboxylase (EC 4.1.1.84), characterised from mammalian cells, catalyzes the decarboxylation of D-dopachrome to 5,6-dihydroxyindole:

D-dopachrome
CO_{2}
5,6-dihydroxyindole

The enzyme is specific for the D-enantiomer of the starting material; in these cells the L-enantiomer is used in a biosynthesis of melanin. it is a macrophage migration inhibitory factor and regulator of innate immunity. and its structure has been determined by X-ray crystallography.

This enzyme belongs to the family of lyases, specifically the carboxy-lyases, which cleave carbon-carbon bonds. The systematic name of this enzyme class is D-dopachrome carboxy-lyase (5,6-dihydroxyindole-forming). Other names in common use include phenylpyruvate tautomerase II, D-tautomerase, D-dopachrome tautomerase, and D-dopachrome carboxy-lyase.
