= Macrophage migration inhibitory factor domain =

MIF
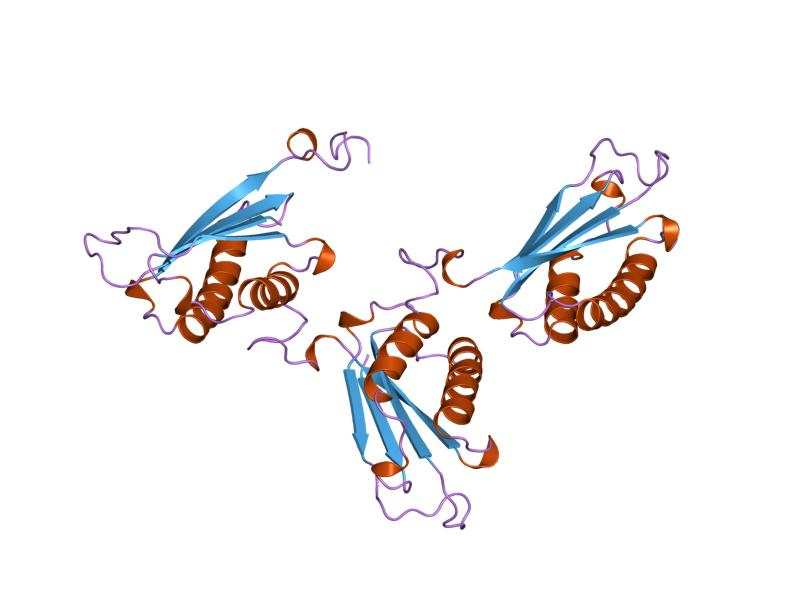
- d-dopachrome tautomerase

Identifiers
- Symbol: MIF
- Pfam: PF01187
- Pfam clan: CL0082
- InterPro: IPR001398
- SMART: MIF4G
- PROSITE: PDOC00892
- SCOP2: 1mif / SCOPe / SUPFAM
Available protein structures:
- Pfam: structures / ECOD
- PDB: RCSB PDB; PDBe; PDBj
- PDBsum: structure summary

Macrophage migration inhibitory factor domain is an evolutionary conserved protein domain.

Macrophage migration inhibitory factor (MIF) is a key regulatory cytokine within innate and adaptive immune responses, capable of promoting and modulating the magnitude of the response. MIF is released from T-cells and macrophages, and acts within the neuroendocrine system. MIF is capable of tautomerase activity, although its biological function has not been fully characterised. It is induced by glucocorticoid and is capable of overriding the anti-inflammatory actions of glucocorticoid. MIF regulates cytokine secretion and the expression of receptors involved in the immune response. It can be taken up into target cells in order to interact with intracellular signalling molecules, inhibiting p53 function, and/or activating components of the mitogen-activated protein kinase and Jun-activation domain-binding protein-1 (Jab-1). MIF has been linked to various inflammatory diseases, such as rheumatoid arthritis and atherosclerosis.

The MIF homologue D-dopachrome tautomerase (EC 4.1.1.84) is involved in detoxification through the conversion of dopaminechrome (and possibly norepinephrinechrome), the toxic quinine product of the neurotransmitter dopamine (and norepinephrine), to an indole derivative that can serve as a precursor to neuromelanin.

== Examples ==
Human genes encoding proteins that contain this domain include DDT and MIF.
