= C9H7NO4 =

The molecular formula C_{9}H_{7}NO_{4} (molar mass: 193.16 g/mol, exact mass: 193.0375 u) may refer to:

- DHICA
- Dopachrome
