= DDT (gene) =

Protein-coding gene in the species Homo sapiens

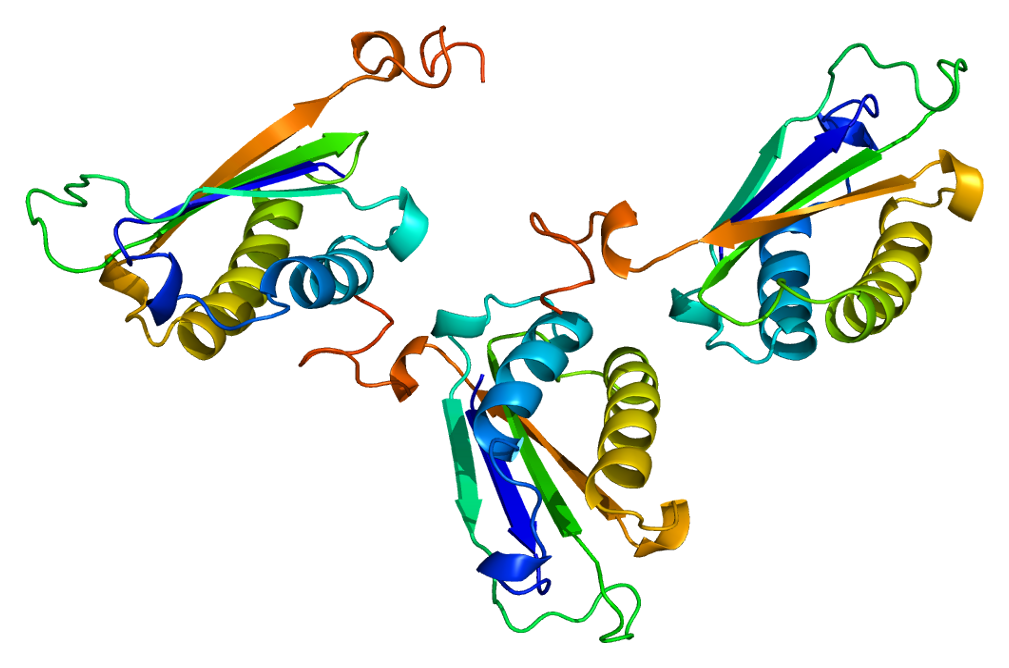

Identifiers
- Aliases: DDT, DDCT, D-dopachrome tautomerase, MIF-2, MIF2, D-DT
- External IDs: OMIM: 602750; MGI: 1298381; GeneCards: DDT
Available structures
| PDB | Ortholog search: PDBe RCSB |
| PDB | List of PDB id codes 4Q3F, 3KAN, 1DPT |
Enzyme activity
| EC # | BRENDA | ExPASy | KEGG | MetaCyc |
|---|---|---|---|---|
| 4.1.1.84 | ↗ | ↗ | ↗ | ↗ |

Gene location (Human)
| Chr. | Chromosome 22 (human) |
| Band | 22q11.23 | Start | 23,971,365 bp |
| Band | 22q11.23 | End | 23,979,828 bp |

Gene location (Mouse)
| Chr. | Chromosome 10 (mouse) |
| Band | 10 C1|10 38.58 cM | Start | 75,607,064 bp |
| Band | 10 C1|10 38.58 cM | End | 75,609,248 bp |
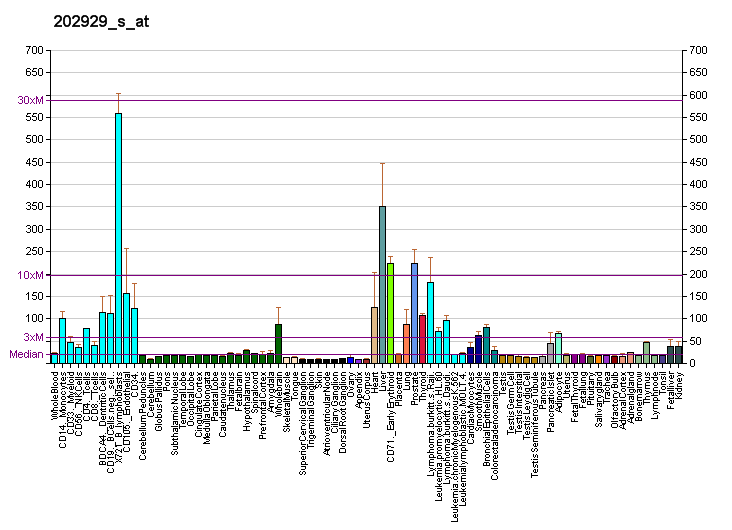
RNA expression pattern
| Bgee | Human / Mouse (ortholog); Top expressed in: right lobe of liver; mucosa of transverse colon; body of pancreas; human kidney; apex of heart; body of stomach; left ventricle; fundus; olfactory zone of nasal mucosa; right adrenal gland / Top expressed in: right kidney; proximal tubule; spermatocyte; yolk sac; human kidney; embryo; testicle; white adipose tissue; epiblast; liver; More reference expression data |
| BioGPS | More reference expression data |
Gene ontology
| Molecular function | dopachrome isomerase activity; D-dopachrome decarboxylase activity; lyase activity; cytokine receptor binding; phenylpyruvate tautomerase activity |
| Cellular component | cytoplasm; extracellular exosome; extracellular space |
| Biological process | melanin biosynthetic process; negative regulation of macrophage chemotaxis; positive regulation of tumor necrosis factor production; positive regulation of inflammatory response; positive regulation of ERK1 and ERK2 cascade |
Sources:Amigo / QuickGO
Orthologs
| Databases | NCBI: entry; OMA: entry |
| Species | Human | Mouse |
| Entrez | 1652 | 13202 |
| Ensembl | ENSG00000099977; ENSG00000275003 | ENSMUSG00000001666 |
| UniProt | P30046 | O35215 |
| RefSeq (mRNA) | NM_001084392; NM_001355; NM_001381852; NM_001397485 | NM_010027 |
| RefSeq (protein) | NP_001077861; NP_001346; NP_001368781 | NP_034157 |
| Location (UCSC) | Chr 22: 23.97 – 23.98 Mb | Chr 10: 75.61 – 75.61 Mb |
| PubMed search |
- Wikidata
| View/Edit Human | View/Edit Mouse |

D-dopachrome decarboxylase is an enzyme that in humans is encoded by the DDT gene.

D-dopachrome tautomerase converts D-dopachrome into 5,6-dihydroxyindole. The DDT gene is related to the macrophage migration inhibitory factor (MIF) in terms of sequence, enzyme activity, and gene structure. DDT and MIF are closely linked on chromosome 22.

== See also ==
- Macrophage migration inhibitory factor domain
