= Tryptophan—phenylpyruvate transaminase =

Tryptophan-phenylpyruvate transaminase

Identifiers
- EC no.: 2.6.1.28
- CAS no.: 37277-87-5

Databases
- IntEnz: IntEnz view
- BRENDA: BRENDA entry
- ExPASy: NiceZyme view
- KEGG: KEGG entry
- MetaCyc: metabolic pathway
- PRIAM: profile
- PDB structures: RCSB PDB PDBe PDBsum
- Gene Ontology: AmiGO / QuickGO
Search
- PMC: articles
- PubMed: articles
- NCBI: proteins

Tryptophan-phenylpyruvate transaminase (EC 2.6.1.28) is an enzyme originally characterised from Agrobacterium tumefaciens that catalyzes a reversible chemical reactions that interconverts L-tryptophan and phenylpyruvic acid with indole-3-pyruvic acid and L-phenylalanine. The enzyme has also been found in the genus Pseudomonas.

tryptophan
+
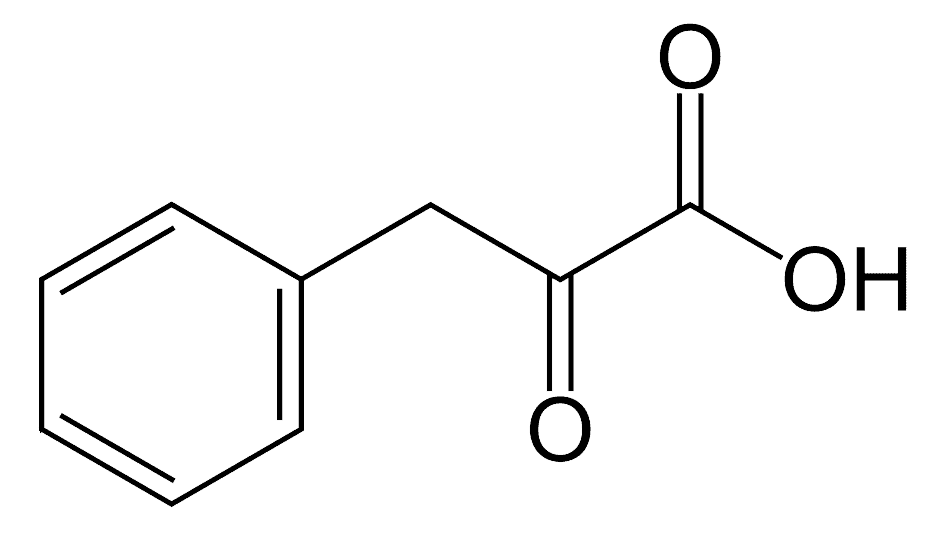
phenylpyruvic acid
indole-3-pyruvic acid
+
phenylalanine

This enzyme is a transferase, specifically a transaminase, which transfer nitrogenous groups. The systematic name of this enzyme class is L-tryptophan:phenylpyruvate aminotransferase. This enzyme is also called L-tryptophan-alpha-ketoisocaproate aminotransferase.
