= Veltuzumab =

Monoclonal antibody

Monoclonal antibody
- Type: Whole antibody
- Source: Humanized (from mouse)
- Target: CD20

Clinical data
- ATC code: none

Identifiers
- CAS Number: 728917-18-8
- ChemSpider: none
- UNII: BPD4DGQ314

Chemical and physical data
- Formula: C_{6458}H_{9918}N_{1706}O_{2026}S_{46}
- Molar mass: 145349.06 g·mol^{−1}

Veltuzumab is a monoclonal antibody (targeted at CD20) which is being investigated for the treatment of non-Hodgkin's lymphoma. As of December 2011, it is undergoing Phase I/II clinical trials. When used with milatuzumab it showed activity.

This drug was developed by Immunomedics, Inc. and was originally known as IMMU-106.

In August 2015 the US FDA granted it orphan drug status for immune thrombocytopenia (ITP). A phase II trial is planned to run for 5 years.

== See also ==
- CD20 antagonist
