= L-dopachrome isomerase =

dopachrome isomerase

Identifiers
- EC no.: 5.3.3.12
- CAS no.: 130122-81-5

Databases
- IntEnz: IntEnz view
- BRENDA: BRENDA entry
- ExPASy: NiceZyme view
- KEGG: KEGG entry
- MetaCyc: metabolic pathway
- PRIAM: profile
- PDB structures: RCSB PDB PDBe PDBsum
- Gene Ontology: AmiGO / QuickGO
Search
- PMC: articles
- PubMed: articles
- NCBI: proteins

In enzymology, a L-dopachrome isomerase (EC 5.3.3.12) is an enzyme that catalyzes the chemical reaction

L-dopachrome $\rightleftharpoons$ 5,6-dihydroxyindole-2-carboxylate

Hence, this enzyme has one substrate, L-dopachrome, and one product, 5,6-dihydroxyindole-2-carboxylate.

This enzyme belongs to the family of isomerases, specifically those intramolecular oxidoreductases transposing C=C bonds. The systematic name of this enzyme class is L-dopachrome keto-enol isomerase. Other names in common use include dopachrome tautomerase, tyrosinase-related protein 2, TRP-1, TRP2, TRP-2, tyrosinase-related protein-2, dopachrome Delta7,Delta2-isomerase, dopachrome Delta-isomerase, dopachrome conversion factor, dopachrome isomerase, dopachrome oxidoreductase, dopachrome-rearranging enzyme, DCF, DCT, dopachrome keto-enol isomerase, and L-dopachrome-methyl ester tautomerase. This enzyme participates in tyrosine metabolism and melanogenesis.
