= Phenylalanine(histidine) transaminase =

Identifiers
- EC no.: 2.6.1.58
- CAS no.: 72560-98-6

Databases
- IntEnz: IntEnz view
- BRENDA: BRENDA entry
- ExPASy: NiceZyme view
- KEGG: KEGG entry
- MetaCyc: metabolic pathway
- PRIAM: profile
- PDB structures: RCSB PDB PDBe PDBsum
- Gene Ontology: AmiGO / QuickGO
Search
- PMC: articles
- PubMed: articles
- NCBI: proteins

Phenylalanine(histidine) transaminase (EC 2.6.1.58) is an enzyme that catalyzes the chemical reaction

phenylalanine
+
pyruvic acid
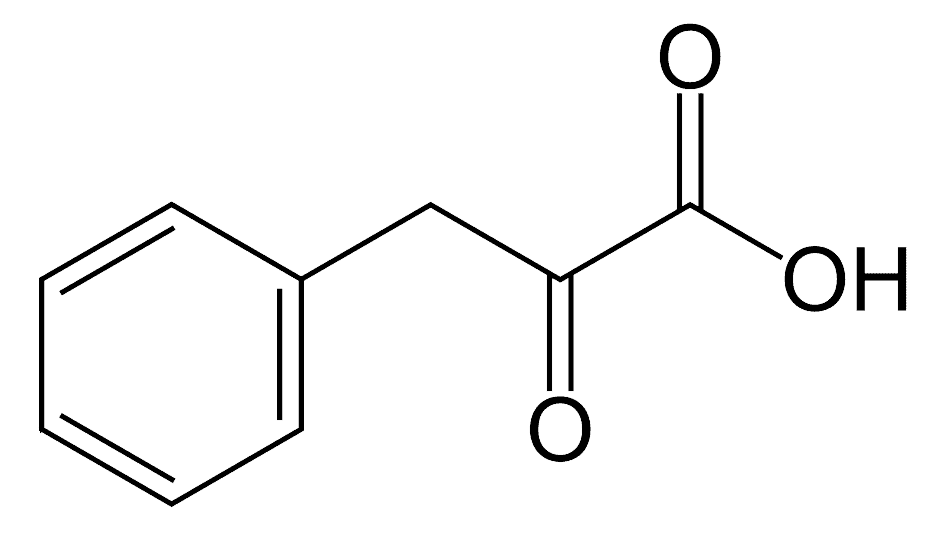
phenylpyruvic acid
+
alanine

The two substrates of this enzyme are L-phenylalanine and pyruvic acid. Its products are phenylpyruvic acid and L-alanine. The enzyme can also use L-histidine and L-tyrosine as substrates.

This enzyme is a transferase, specifically a transaminase, which transfer nitrogenous groups. The systematic name of this enzyme class is L-phenylalanine:pyruvate aminotransferase. Other names in common use include phenylalanine (histidine) aminotransferase, phenylalanine(histidine):pyruvate aminotransferase, histidine:pyruvate aminotransferase, and L-phenylalanine(L-histidine):pyruvate aminotransferase.
