= Aromatic-amino-acid—glyoxylate transaminase =

Class of enzymes

Aromatic-amino-acid-glyoxylate transaminase

Identifiers
- EC no.: 2.6.1.60
- CAS no.: 67185-76-6

Databases
- IntEnz: IntEnz view
- BRENDA: BRENDA entry
- ExPASy: NiceZyme view
- KEGG: KEGG entry
- MetaCyc: metabolic pathway
- PRIAM: profile
- PDB structures: RCSB PDB PDBe PDBsum
- Gene Ontology: AmiGO / QuickGO
Search
- PMC: articles
- PubMed: articles
- NCBI: proteins

An aromatic-amino-acid-glyoxylate transaminase (EC 2.6.1.60) is an enzyme that catalyzes the chemical reaction

an aromatic amino acid + glyoxylic acid $\rightleftharpoons$ an aromatic oxo acid + glycine

Thus, the two substrates of this enzyme are aromatic amino acid and glyoxylic acid. Its products are the corresponding α-keto acid and glycine.

For example, the enzyme characterised from liver interconverts phenylalanine and phenylpyruvic acid:

phenylalanine
+
glyoxylic acid
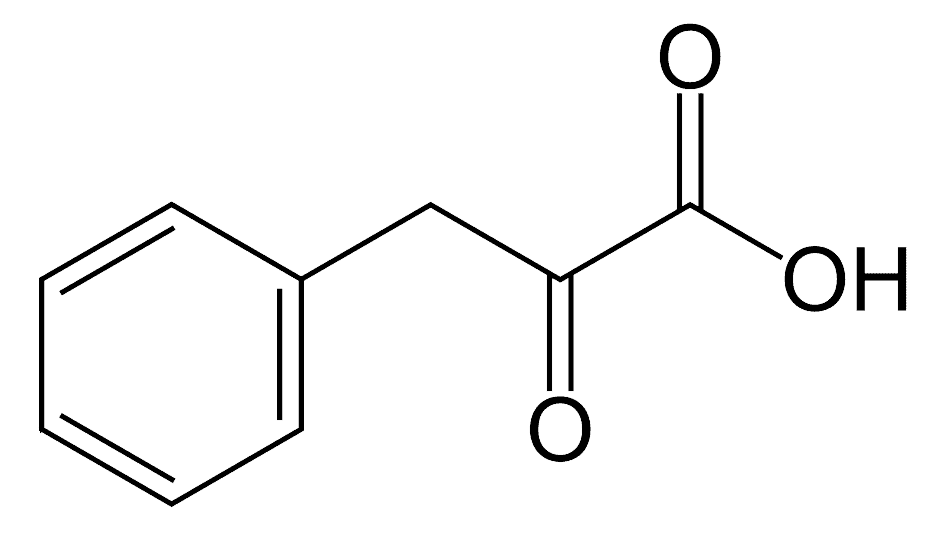
phenylpyruvic acid
+
glycine

This enzyme is a transferase, specifically a transaminase, which transfer nitrogenous groups. The systematic name of this enzyme class is aromatic-amino-acid:glyoxylate aminotransferase.
