= Aspartate—phenylpyruvate transaminase =

Aspartate-phenylpyruvate transaminase

Identifiers
- EC no.: 2.6.1.70
- CAS no.: 99533-45-6

Databases
- IntEnz: IntEnz view
- BRENDA: BRENDA entry
- ExPASy: NiceZyme view
- KEGG: KEGG entry
- MetaCyc: metabolic pathway
- PRIAM: profile
- PDB structures: RCSB PDB PDBe PDBsum
- Gene Ontology: AmiGO / QuickGO
Search
- PMC: articles
- PubMed: articles
- NCBI: proteins

Aspartate-phenylpyruvate transaminase (EC 2.6.1.70) is an enzyme that catalyzes the chemical reaction

aspartic acid
+
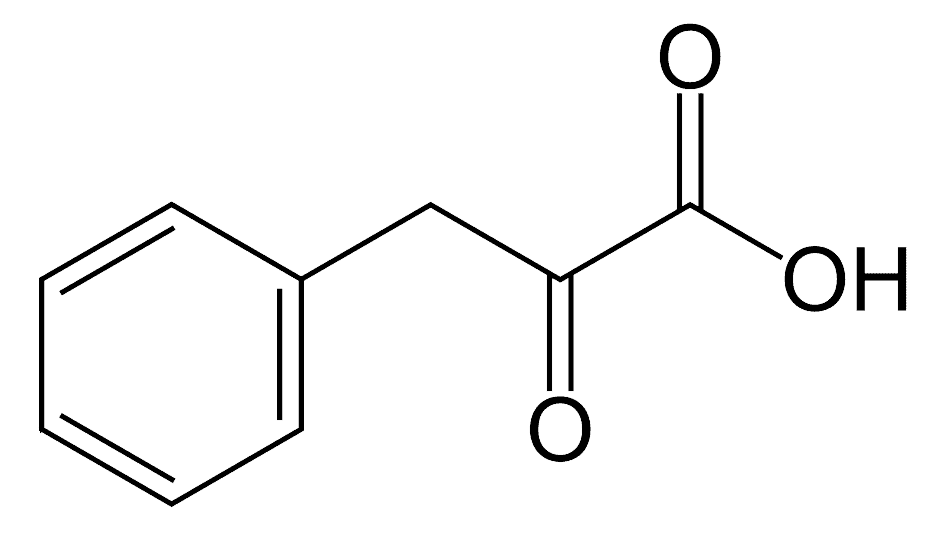
phenylpyruvic acid
oxaloacetic acid
+
phenylalanine

The two substrates of this enzyme characterised from Pseudomonas putida are L-aspartic acid and phenylpyruvic acid. Its products are oxaloacetic acid and L-phenylalanine.

This enzyme is a transferase, specifically a transaminase, which transfer nitrogenous groups. The systematic name of this enzyme class is L-aspartate:phenylpyruvate aminotransferase. It is also called aspartate-phenylpyruvate aminotransferase.
