= Immunomedics =

Former pharmaceutical company

- Type: Public
- Traded as: Nasdaq: IMMU
- Industry: Biotechnology
- Founded: July 1982; 44 years ago
- Founder: David M. Goldenberg
- Defunct: October 23, 2020; 5 years ago
- Headquarters: Morris Plains, New Jersey
- Parent: Gilead Sciences
- Website: www.immunomedics.com

Immunomedics was a biotechnology company focused on the development of antibody-drug conjugates for the treatment of cancer. In 2020, the company was acquired by Gilead Sciences for $21 billion.

== History ==
Immunomedics was founded in July 1982 by David M. Goldenberg.

Michael Pehl was named CEO in December 2017 but left for personal reasons in February 2019. At that time, Dr. Behzad Aghazadeh was named Executive Chairman.

In October 2020, Gilead Sciences acquired the company. In March 2022, Gilead announced the closing of the former Immunomedics facility in Morris Plains.

== Products ==
- Epratuzumab is a humanized anti-CD22 monoclonal antibody in phase III trials for pediatric leukemia.
- Sacituzumab govitecan (IMMU-132 / Trodelvy) is an anti-Trop-2-SN-38 antibody-drug conjugate for breast cancer and solid tumors. It was approved in April 2020 by the FDA for the treatment of adult patients with metastatic triple-negative breast cancer (mTNBC) who have received at least two prior therapies for patients with relapsed or refractory metastatic disease. In 2017, the company scrapped a licensing deal for the drug with Seagen that led to the resignation of founder David M. Goldenberg.
- Labetuzumab (IMMU-130) is an anti-CEACAM5-SN-38 antibody-drug conjugate in clinical trials for colorectal cancer.
- Veltuzumab is an anti-CD20 monoclonal antibody for treatment of cancer.
- Milatuzumab (IMMU-110) is an anti-CD74 monoclonal antibody for autoimmune diseases.
- IMMU-114 is an anti-HLA-DR for hematological cancers.
