= Pyomelanin =

Biologically active pigment made by bacteria and fungi

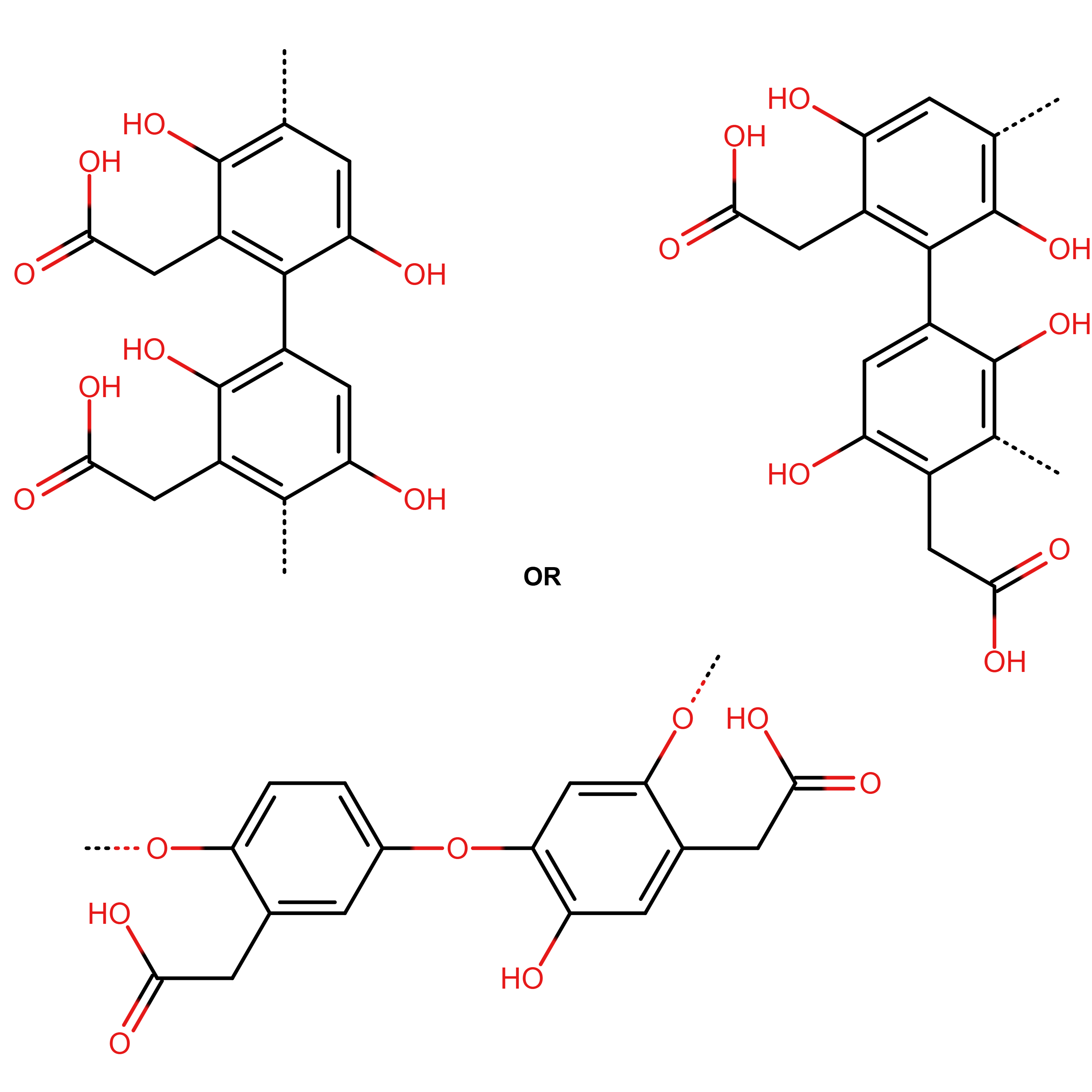
Differents forms of possible polymerization of HGA into pyomelanin

Pyomelanin is one of the five basic types of melanin. It is a polymer resulting from the oxidation and polymerization of homogentisic acid (HGA).

This brownish pigment can be produced by microorganisms such as bacteria and fungi. It has several properties such as metal bonding, redox and electron shuttle, and protective roles such as anti-microbial activity or anti-oxidative stress. These properties are mainly used in cosmetics and pharmacology.

== Historical context ==
Pyomelanin was first discovered in 1897 by a French cavalryman. This molecule was reported as a “pyocyanic bacillus” by Maxime Radais at the Faculty of Pharmacy in Paris. To cure a rare disease, the alkaptonuria (ALK) that appeared in 1902, researches led to rediscover the “pyocyanic bacillus”, that was then reevaluated and validated as pyomelanin.

== Synthesis ==
=== Natural synthesis ===
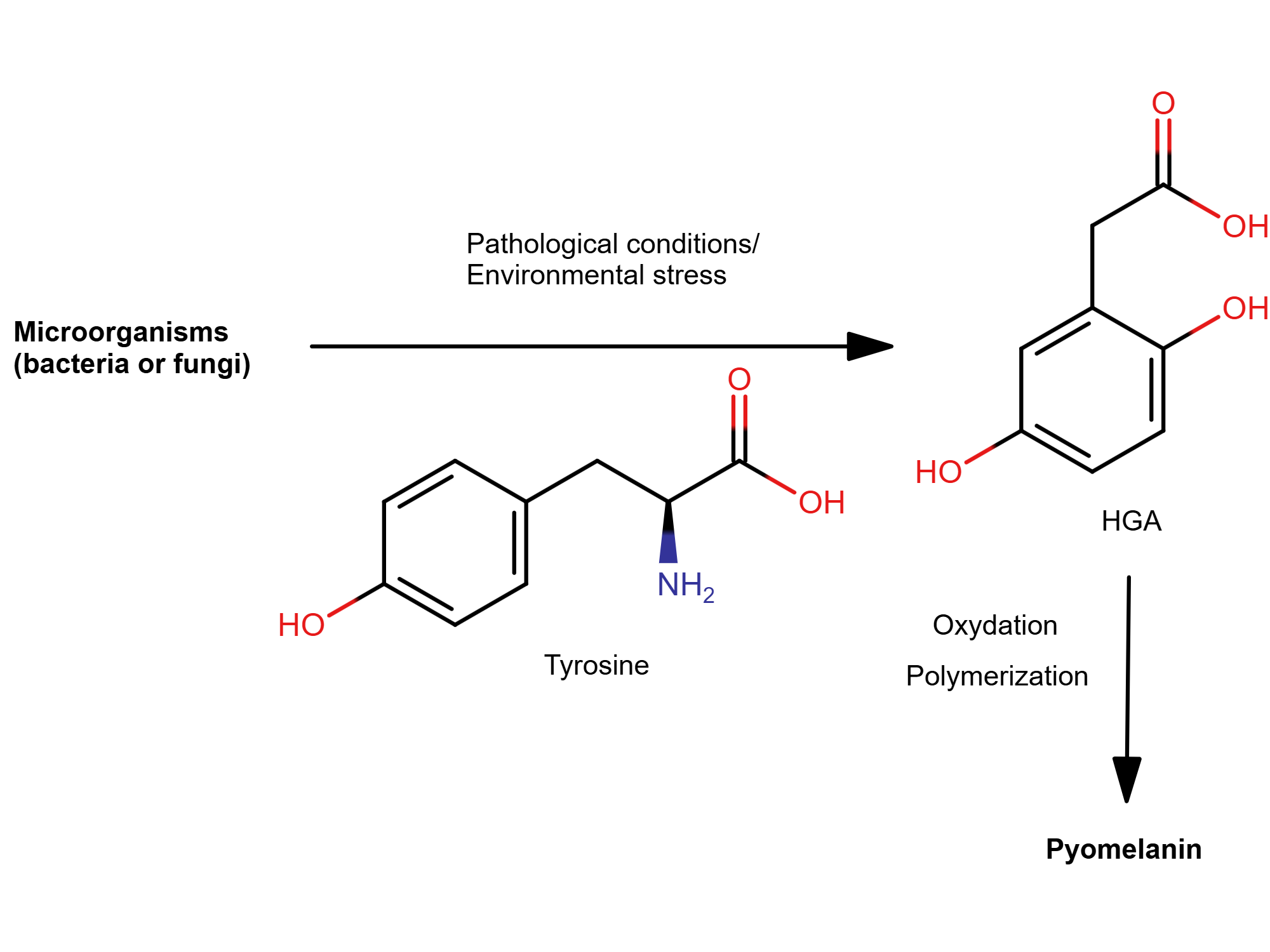
Natural synthesis of pyomelanin

In opposition to other types of melanin, pyomelanin is a molecule synthesized in the human body in specific cases, by microorganisms such as bacteria and fungi. This molecule can be produced in certain pathological conditions, or in response to environmental stress.

Its production is encouraged by a tyrosine-enriched environment. The latter results from an enzyme deficiency that leads to an accumulation of homogentisic acid (HGA), produced by 26 genes, which can cause the genetic disease alkaptonuria. In this case, the excessive production of pyomelanin can lead to ochronosis, dark coloration of the urine, unusual pigmentation of the skin and degradation of the skin cartilage (arthritis).

In a healthy body, the production of pyomelanin is blocked by the enzyme homogentisate 1,2-dioxygenase which prevents the accumulation of HGA.

=== Artificial synthesis ===
Pyomelanin can be reproduced artificially by mimicking the natural way. Starting by transforming L-tyrosine to 2,5-depot medroxyprogesterone acetate (2,5-DMPA) then to HGA. Two synthesis methods exist.

==== Chemical method ====
HGA can be oxidzed using manganese(II) hydroxide into benzoquinone acetic acid (BQA) then polymerized.

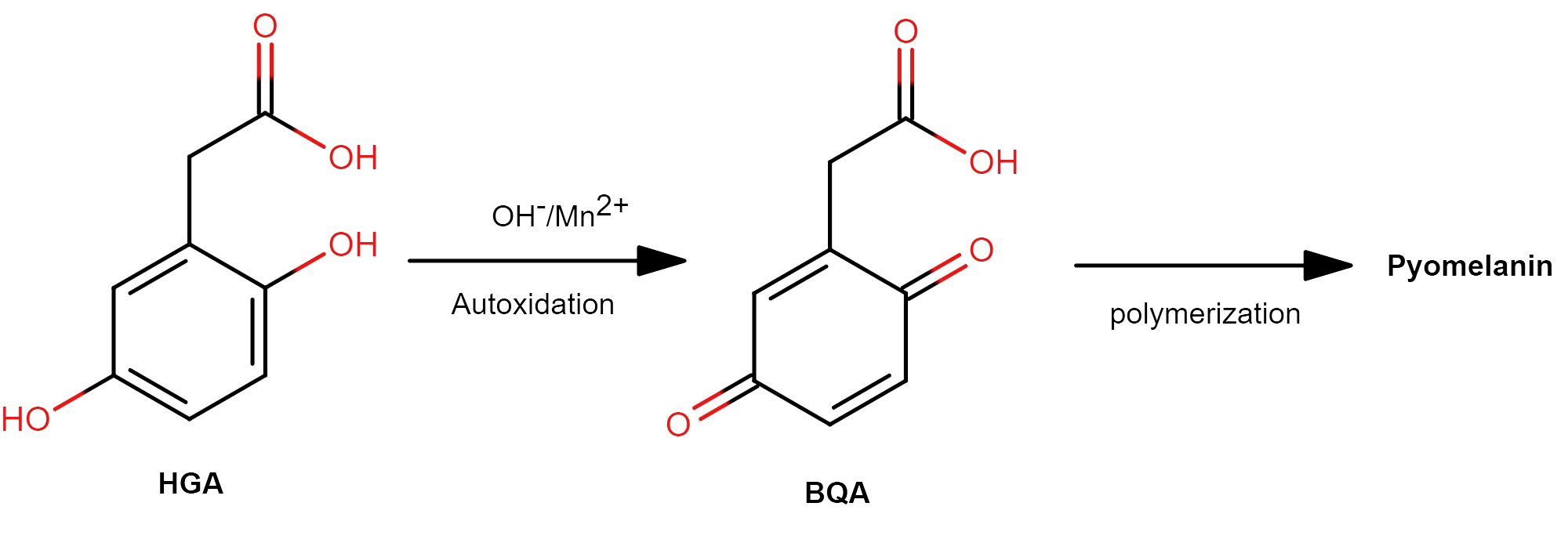
Artificial synthesis of pyomelanin by oxidation

==== Enzymatic method ====
HGA can be accumulated by inhibiting the enzyme homogentisate 1,2-dioxygenase in different bacterial or fungus cultures. It can either oxidize and become BQA or go the long way by decarboxylation and becomes gentisyl alcohol quinone. Those can oxidize and polymerize and become pyomelanin.

This procedure is the most convenient one due to its three-step successive process, others procedures exist but are not used as much (due to the cost of reactants and complexity of the reactions).

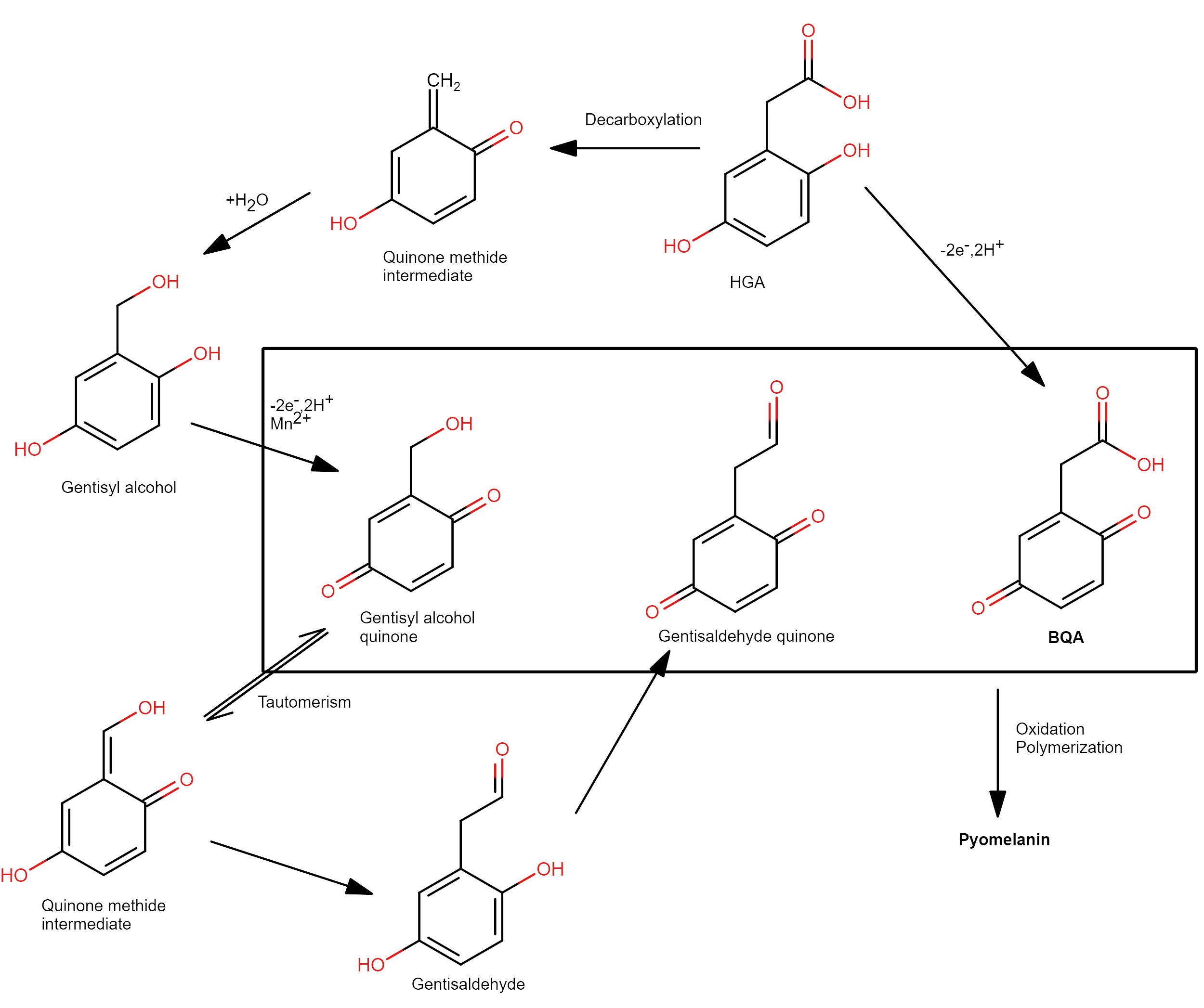
Artificial synthesis of pyomelanin with enzymes

== Properties ==
=== Antioxidant activity ===
Pyomelanin possesses antioxidant activities, as evidenced by its interaction with 2,2-diphenyl-1-picrylhydrazyl (DPPH). Pyomelanin reduces the stable DPPH radical to its non-radical form, leading to a decrease in absorbance, which indicates a strong free radical scavenging activity. Research has shown that a hppD gene (4-hydroxyphenylpyruvate dioxygenase), and a low expression of the hppA gene (homogentisa dioxygenase), results in high production of homogentisic acid (HGA) which then oxidizes to form pyomelanin in microorganizations. Inactivation of the hppA gene reduces bacterial tolerance to oxidative stress caused by environmental aggressions. Pyomelanin play a role in protecting biological systems against oxidative stress.

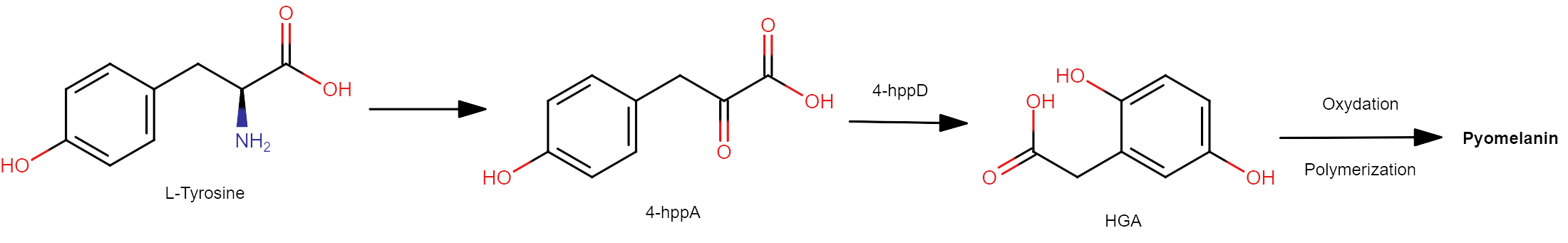
Natural synthesis of pyomelanin with hppD and hppA

=== Electron transfer ===
Due to its redox properties, pyomelanin plays a role in electron transfer and Fe^{3+} reduction to Fe^{2+}. It can act as a terminal electron acceptor, an electron shuttle, or a conduit facilitating electron transport. This property enhances the current response of biofilms, particularly in microbial fuel cells, thereby promoting electricity production. Additionally, pyomelanin contributes to the mobilization and storage of cations in the environment. In its reduced form, it can anaerobically reduce Fe^{3+} to Fe^{2+}, a crucial process for maintaining cellular homeostasis, especially in organisms lacking transporters or siderophores. In Legionella pneumophila, both homogentisic acid (HGA) and pyomelanin facilitate Fe^{3+} reduction, making Fe^{2+} available for bacterial uptake. Furthermore, under low dissolved oxygen levels, the HGA pigment accelerates solid-phase metal reduction, aiding in the survival of bacteria such as Shewanella oneidensis MR-1.

=== Moderate anti-inflammatory activity ===
The effect of pyomelanin on inflammation is primarily based on its ability to reduce reactive oxygen species (ROS), which play a role in inflammatory processes. A study isolated pyomelanin in the form of ultra-small pyomelanin nanogranules (PNG) and evaluated its anti-inflammatory activity. Tests on activated macrophages showed a moderate reduction in ∙NO radical production. Analysis of the cell lysate from this strain revealed significant inhibition of several inflammatory enzymes, including cyclooxygenase, lipoxygenase, and myeloperoxidase. These findings suggest that pyomelanin could be used in therapeutic applications to modulate inflammation.

=== Antimicrobial activity ===
Many micro - organisms are capable of producing pyomelanin in their strains, and for some, the production of increasing quantities of pyomelanin makes some of their strains aggressive, and this overproduction of pyomelanin disrupts homogentisate oxidase (HGO). This hyperproduction promotes better adaptation to chronic infections.

=== UV free radicals ===
Pyomelanin protects micro-organisms against ultraviolet radiation, reducing the formation of free radicals and increasing their resistance to light. Studies have been carried out on this property of pyomelanin, in particular against ultraviolet A (UVA) radiation, known to induce reactive oxygen species (ROS), which generate free radicals that can lead to collagen cross-linking and degradation.
