= CD74 =

Mammalian protein found in humans

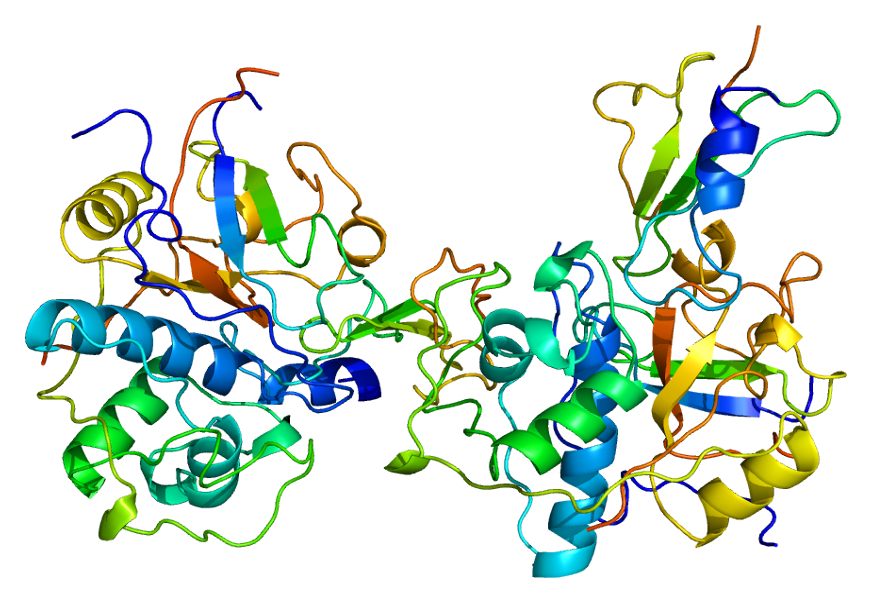

Identifiers
- Aliases: CD74, DHLAG, HLADG, II, Ia-GAMMA, CD74 molecule, p33, CLIP
- External IDs: OMIM: 142790; MGI: 96534; GeneCards: CD74
Available structures
PDB	Ortholog search: PDBe RCSB
PDB	List of PDB id codes 1A6A, 1ICF, 1IIE, 1L3H, 1MUJ, 3PDO, 3PGC, 3PGD, 3QXA, 3QXD, 4AEN, 4X5W

Gene location (Human)
Chr.	Chromosome 5 (human)
Band	5q33.1	Start	150,401,637 bp
Band	5q33.1	End	150,412,969 bp

Gene location (Mouse)
Chr.	Chromosome 18 (mouse)
Band	18 E1|18 34.41 cM	Start	60,936,920 bp
Band	18 E1|18 34.41 cM	End	60,945,724 bp
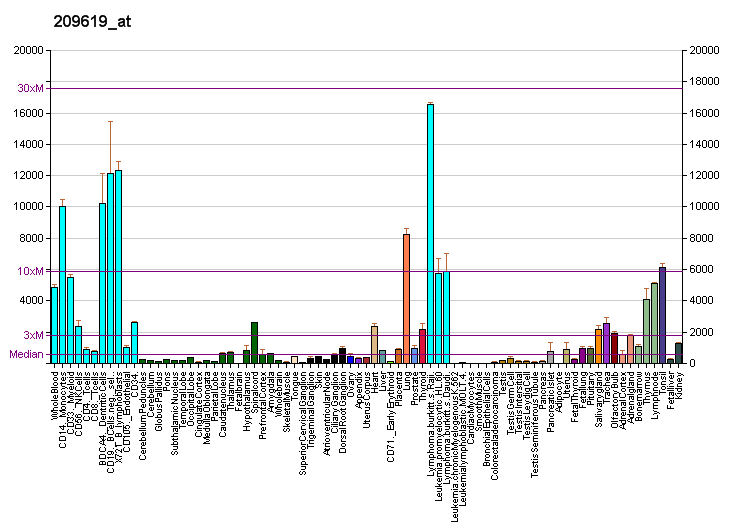
RNA expression pattern
Bgee	Human / Mouse (ortholog); Top expressed in: monocyte; appendix; granulocyte; spleen; lymph node; right lung; gallbladder; upper lobe of left lung; lower lobe of lung; mucosa of ileum / Top expressed in: spleen; jejunum; thymus; ileum; zone of skin; colon; lip; uterus; adrenal gland; white adipose tissue; More reference expression data
BioGPS	More reference expression data
Gene ontology
Molecular function	nitric-oxide synthase binding; identical protein binding; MHC class II protein binding, via antigen binding groove; cytokine receptor activity; macrophage migration inhibitory factor binding; protein folding chaperone activity; MHC class II protein complex binding; amyloid-beta binding; protein binding; MHC class II protein binding; cytokine binding; CD4 receptor binding
Cellular component	lysosomal lumen; extracellular exosome; MHC class II protein complex; lysosomal membrane; late endosome; endocytic vesicle membrane; transport vesicle membrane; integral component of membrane; ER to Golgi transport vesicle membrane; multivesicular body; Golgi apparatus; Golgi membrane; trans-Golgi network membrane; macrophage migration inhibitory factor receptor complex; membrane; cell surface; intracellular anatomical structure; integral component of lumenal side of endoplasmic reticulum membrane; endoplasmic reticulum; endoplasmic reticulum membrane; plasma membrane; lysosome; vacuole; endosome; clathrin-coated endocytic vesicle membrane; NOS2-CD74 complex; external side of plasma membrane
Biological process	immune response; positive regulation of T cell differentiation; negative regulation of apoptotic process; signal transduction; positive thymic T cell selection; chaperone cofactor-dependent protein refolding; T cell selection; positive regulation of type 2 immune response; positive regulation of dendritic cell antigen processing and presentation; antigen processing and presentation of exogenous peptide antigen via MHC class II; adaptive immune response; antigen processing and presentation; positive regulation of peptidyl-tyrosine phosphorylation; negative regulation of mature B cell apoptotic process; regulation of macrophage activation; negative regulation of DNA damage response, signal transduction by p53 class mediator; immunoglobulin mediated immune response; leukocyte migration; positive regulation of neutrophil chemotaxis; positive regulation of chemokine (C-X-C motif) ligand 2 production; macrophage migration inhibitory factor signaling pathway; prostaglandin biosynthetic process; cell population proliferation; antigen processing and presentation of endogenous antigen; immune system process; defense response; negative regulation of peptide secretion; negative regulation of T cell differentiation; positive regulation of macrophage cytokine production; positive regulation of B cell proliferation; negative thymic T cell selection; positive regulation of fibroblast proliferation; intracellular protein transport; positive regulation of ERK1 and ERK2 cascade; negative regulation of intrinsic apoptotic signaling pathway in response to DNA damage by p53 class mediator; positive regulation of cytokine-mediated signaling pathway; positive regulation of protein phosphorylation; positive regulation of kinase activity; positive regulation of I-kappaB kinase/NF-kappaB signaling; positive regulation of MAPK cascade; positive regulation of monocyte differentiation; positive regulation of transcription, DNA-templated; positive regulation of viral entry into host cell; protein heterotetramerization; protein trimerization; protein-containing complex assembly
Sources:Amigo / QuickGO
Orthologs
Databases	NCBI: entry; OMA: entry
Species	Human	Mouse
Entrez	972	16149
Ensembl	ENSG00000019582	ENSMUSG00000024610
UniProt	P04233	P04441
RefSeq (mRNA)	NM_004355; NM_001025158; NM_001025159; NM_001364083; NM_001364084	NM_001042605; NM_010545
RefSeq (protein)	NP_001020329; NP_001020330; NP_004346; NP_001351012; NP_001351013	NP_001036070; NP_034675
Location (UCSC)	Chr 5: 150.4 – 150.41 Mb	Chr 18: 60.94 – 60.95 Mb
PubMed search
- Wikidata
View/Edit Human	View/Edit Mouse

HLA class II histocompatibility antigen gamma chain also known as HLA-DR antigens-associated invariant chain or CD74 (Cluster of Differentiation 74), is a protein that in humans is encoded by the CD74 gene. The invariant chain (Abbreviated Ii) is a polypeptide which plays a critical role in antigen presentation. It is involved in the formation and transport of MHC class II peptide complexes for the generation of CD4+ T cell responses. The cell surface form of the invariant chain is known as CD74. CD74 is a cell surface receptor for the cytokine macrophage migration inhibitory factor (MIF).

== Structure ==
The nascent MHC class II protein in the rough endoplasmic reticulum (RER) binds a segment of the invariant chain (Ii; a trimer), which shapes the peptide-binding groove and prevents the formation of a closed conformation. CD74 exists in several isoforms, most commonly p33, p35, p41, and p43, generated by alternative splicing and translation initiation sites. Isoforms p33/35 and p41/43 differ in the length of their luminal domains, with p41 and p43 containing an additional thyroglobulin-like region that influences proteolytic processing and MHC class II antigen presentation. Isoforms p35 and p43 also contain N-terminal extensions that enhance endoplasmic reticulum retention relative to p33 and p41.

== Function ==
The invariant chain facilitates the export of MHC class II molecules from the RER in transport vesicles. The signal for endosomal targeting resides in the cytoplasmic tail of the invariant chain, directing the complex to late endosomes containing endocytosed antigens from the exogenous pathway. Binding of the invariant chain prevents peptides from the endogenous pathway, which are destined for MHC class I molecules, from occupying the peptide-binding groove of MHC class II molecules.

The invariant chain is subsequently cleaved by cathepsin S (cathepsin L in cortical thymic epithelial cells), leaving only the CLIP fragment bound within the peptide-binding groove of MHC class II molecules, while the remainder of the invariant chain is degraded. CLIP prevents premature peptide binding until HLA-DM catalyzes its release, allowing antigenic peptides to bind. In some cases, CLIP dissociates spontaneously, whereas in others its interaction with MHC class II is sufficiently stable to require HLA-DM-mediated peptide exchange.

The resulting stable MHC class II–antigen complex is then presented on the cell surface for recognition by CD4^{+} T cells. In the absence of CLIP, MHC class II molecules aggregate, dissociate, or denature within endosomes, impairing efficient antigen presentation.

== Clinical significance ==
=== Vaccine adjuvant ===
The Ii molecule—fused with a viral vector to a conserved region of the Hepatitis C virus (HCV) genome—has been tested as an adjuvant for a HCV vaccine in a cohort of 17 healthy human volunteers. This experimental vaccine was well-tolerated, and those who received the adjuvanted vaccine had stronger anti-HCV immune responses (enhanced magnitude, breadth and proliferative capacity of anti-HCV-specific T-cells) compared with volunteers who received the vaccine that lacked the Ii adjuvant.

The Ii molecule might also prove to be useful as an adjuvant for a future vaccine for the SARS-CoV-2 virus, if this enhancing effect can be demonstrated to apply to the appropriate antigen(s).

=== Cancer ===
Found on a number of cancer cell types. Possible cancer therapy target. See milatuzumab.

=== Axial spondyloarthritis ===
Autoantibodies against CD74 have been identified as promising biomarkers in the early diagnosis of the autoimmune disease called axial spondyloarthritis (non-radiographic axial spondyloarthritis and radiographic axial spondyloarthritis / Ankylosing spondylitis).

== Interactions ==
CD74 receptor interacts with the cytokine Macrophage migration inhibitory factor (MIF) to mediate some of its functions.

== Recovery functions ==
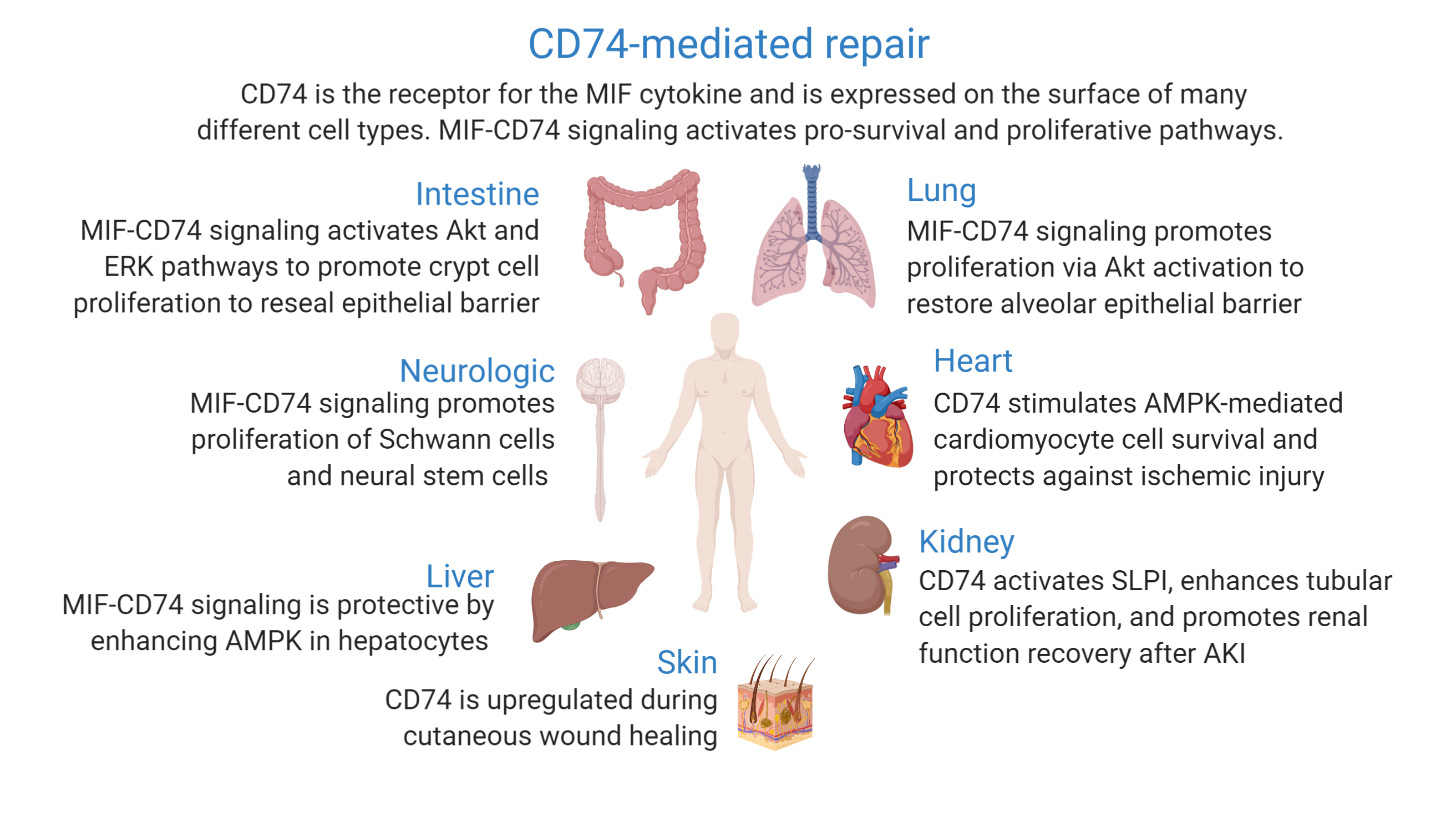
Role of CD74 receptor in tissue injury and wound repair

CD74 receptor is expressed on the surface of different cell types. Interaction between MIF cytokine and its cell membrane receptor CD74 activates pro-survival and proliferative pathways that protect against injury and promote healing in different parts of the body.

== History ==
The invariant chain was first described by Patricia P. Jones, Donal B. Murphy, Derek Hewgill, and Hugh McDevitt at Stanford. The nomenclature "Ii" comes from an Ix-based naming system (I for Immune) that predates the naming of the Major Histocompatibility Complex.

== See also ==
- Cluster of differentiation
- Milatuzumab the first Mab to target CD74
