= Phenylpyruvate tautomerase =

Identifiers
- EC no.: 5.3.2.1
- CAS no.: 9023-54-5

Databases
- IntEnz: IntEnz view
- BRENDA: BRENDA entry
- ExPASy: NiceZyme view
- KEGG: KEGG entry
- MetaCyc: metabolic pathway
- PRIAM: profile
- PDB structures: RCSB PDB PDBe PDBsum
- Gene Ontology: AmiGO / QuickGO
Search
- PMC: articles
- PubMed: articles
- NCBI: proteins

In enzymology, phenylpyruvate tautomerase or Macrophage migration inhibitory factor (EC 5.3.2.1) is an enzyme that catalyzes the chemical reaction keto-phenylpyruvate $\rightleftharpoons$ enol-phenylpyruvate

Phenylpyruvate tautomerase has also been found to exhibit the same keto-enol tautomerism for 4-Hydroxyphenylpyruvic acid, which is structurally similar to phenylpyruvate but contains an additional hydroxyl moiety in the para position of the aromatic ring.

This enzyme belongs to the family of isomerases, specifically those intramolecular oxidoreductases interconverting keto- and enol-groups. The systematic name of this enzyme class is phenylpyruvate keto---enol-isomerase. This enzyme is also called phenylpyruvic keto-enol isomerase. This enzyme participates in tyrosine metabolism and phenylalanine metabolism.

== Structural studies ==
As of late 2007, 7 structures have been solved for this class of enzymes, with PDB accession codes 1GYJ, 1GYX, 1GYY, 2GDG, 2OOH, 2OOW, and 2OOZ.
