= Melanin =

Group of natural pigments found in most organisms

- One possible structure of eumelanin
- Material type: Heterogeneous biopolymer

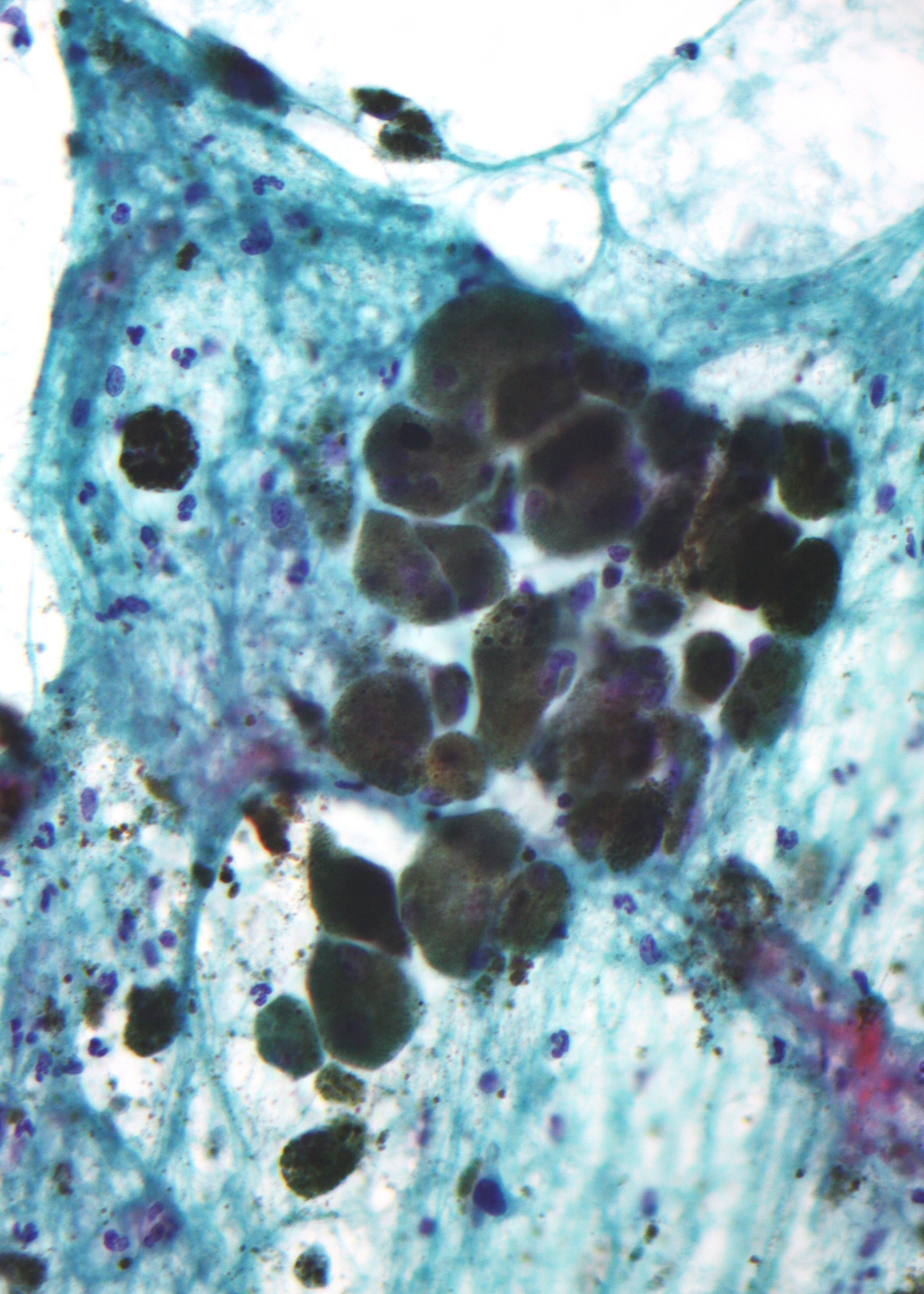
Micrograph of melanin pigment (light refracting granular material—center of image) in a pigmented melanoma

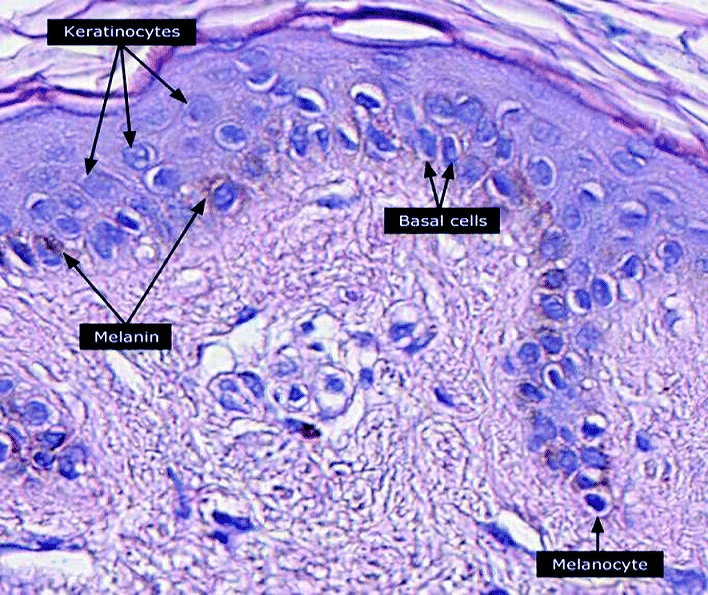
Micrograph of the epidermis, with melanin labeled at left

Melanin (/ˈmɛlənɪn/; from Ancient Greek μέλας (mélas) 'black, dark') is a family of biomolecules organized as oligomers or polymers, which among other functions provide the pigments of many organisms. Melanin pigments are produced in a specialized group of cells known as melanocytes.

There are five basic types of melanin: eumelanin, pheomelanin, neuromelanin, allomelanin and pyomelanin. Melanin is produced through a multistage chemical process known as melanogenesis, where the oxidation of the amino acid tyrosine is followed by polymerization. Pheomelanin is a cysteinated form containing polybenzothiazine portions that are largely responsible for the red or yellow tint given to some skin or hair colors. Neuromelanin is found in the brain. Research has been undertaken to investigate its efficacy in treating neurodegenerative disorders such as Parkinson's. Allomelanin and pyomelanin are two types of nitrogen-free melanin.

The phenotypic color variation observed in the epidermis and hair of mammals is primarily determined by the levels of eumelanin and pheomelanin in the examined tissue. In an average human individual, eumelanin is more abundant in tissues requiring photoprotection, such as the epidermis and the retinal pigment epithelium. In healthy subjects, epidermal melanin is correlated with UV exposure, while retinal melanin has been found to correlate with age, with levels diminishing 2.5-fold between the first and ninth decades of life, which has been attributed to oxidative degradation mediated by reactive oxygen species generated via lipofuscin-dependent pathways. In the absence of albinism or hyperpigmentation, the human epidermis contains approximately 74% eumelanin and 26% pheomelanin, largely irrespective of skin tone, with eumelanin content ranging between 71.8–78.9%, and pheomelanin varying between 21.1–28.2%. Total melanin content in the epidermis ranges from around 0 μg/mg in albino epidermal tissue to >10 μg/mg in darker tissue.

In the human skin, melanogenesis is initiated by exposure to UV radiation, causing the skin to darken. Eumelanin is an effective absorbent of light; the pigment is able to dissipate over 99.9% of absorbed UV radiation. Because of this property, eumelanin is thought to protect skin cells from UVA and UVB radiation damage, reducing the risk of folate depletion and dermal degradation. Exposure to UV radiation is associated with increased risk of melanoma, a cancer of melanocytes (melanin cells). Studies have shown a lower incidence for skin cancer in individuals with more concentrated melanin, i.e. darker skin tone.

== Melanin types ==
=== Eumelanin ===
Part of the structural formula of eumelanin. "(COOH)" can be COOH or H, or (more rarely) other substituents. The arrow denotes where the polymer continues.

Eumelanin (lit. 'true melanin') has two forms linked to 5,6-dihydroxyindole (DHI) and 5,6-dihydroxyindole-2-carboxylic acid (DHICA). DHI-derived eumelanin is dark brown or black and insoluble, and DHICA -derived eumelanin is lighter and soluble in alkali. Both eumelanins arise from the oxidation of tyrosine in specialized organelles called melanosomes. This reaction is catalyzed by the enzyme tyrosinase. The initial product, dopaquinone can transform into either 5,6-dihydroxyindole (DHI) or 5,6-dihydroxyindole-2-carboxylic acid (DHICA). DHI and DHICA are oxidized and then polymerize to form the two eumelanins.

In natural conditions, DHI and DHICA often co-polymerize, resulting in a range of eumelanin polymers. These polymers contribute to the variety of melanin components in human skin and hair, ranging from light yellow/red pheomelanin to light brown DHICA-enriched eumelanin and dark brown or black DHI-enriched eumelanin. These final polymers differ in solubility and color.

Analysis of highly pigmented (Fitzpatrick type V and VI) skin finds that DHI-eumelanin comprises the largest portion, approximately 60–70%, followed by DHICA-eumelanin at 25–35%, and pheomelanin only 2–8%. Notably, while an enrichment of DHI-eumelanin occurs in during sun tanning, it is accompanied by a decrease in DHICA-eumelanin and pheomelanin. A small amount of black eumelanin in the absence of other pigments causes grey hair. A small amount of eumelanin in the absence of other pigments causes blond hair. Eumelanin is present in the skin and hair, etc.

=== Pheomelanin ===
Part of the structural formula of pheomelanin. "(COOH)" can be COOH or H, or (more rarely) other substituents. The arrows denote where the polymer continues.

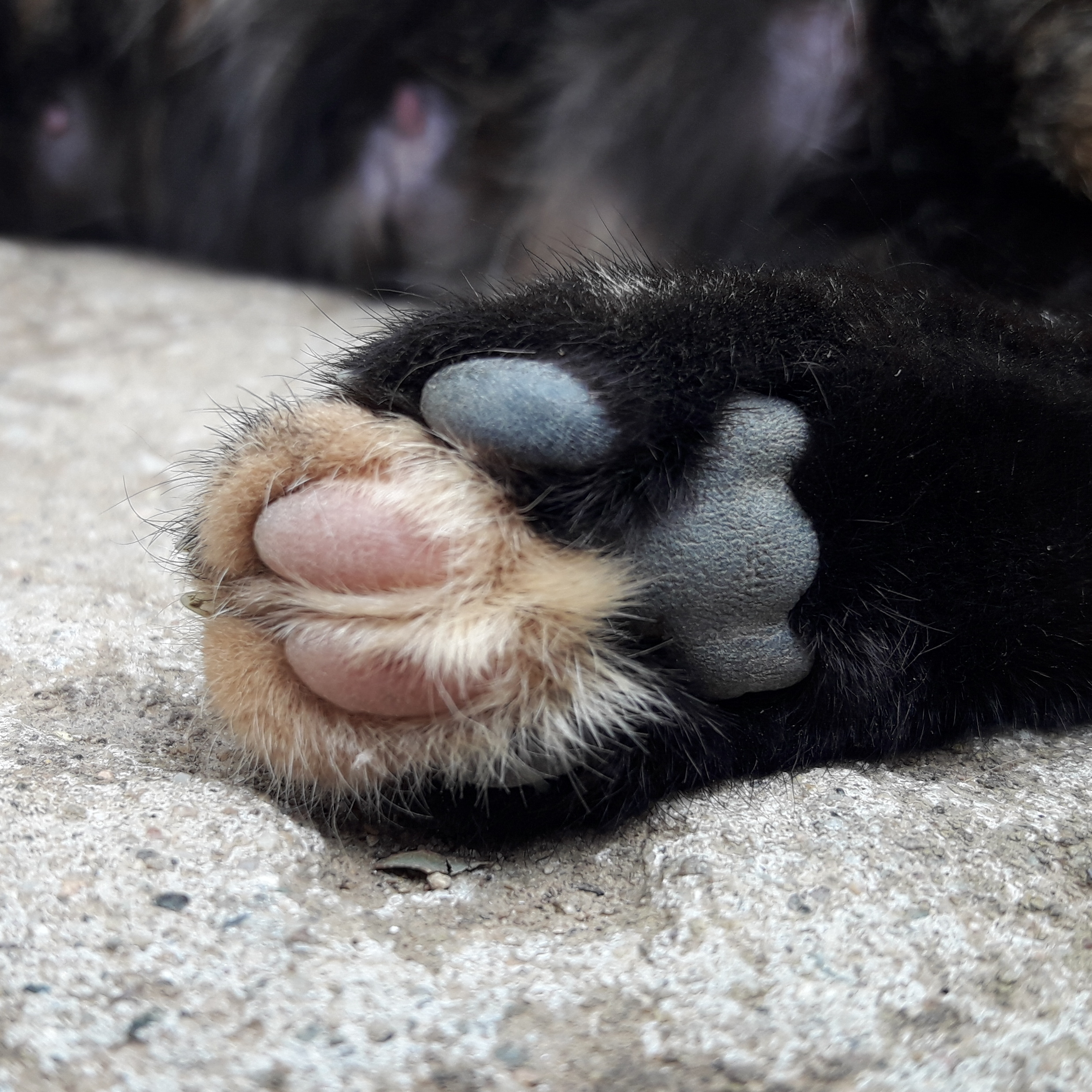
Display of the presentation of the red pheomelanin pigment alongside the black eumelanin pigment in the hairs and skin of the paw pad of a tortoiseshell cat.

Pheomelanins (US English) or phaeomelanins (UK English) (from Greek φαιός phaios 'grey') impart a range of yellowish to reddish colors. Pheomelanins are particularly concentrated in the lips, nipples, glans of the penis, and vagina. When a small amount of eumelanin in hair (which would otherwise cause blond hair) is mixed with pheomelanin, the result is orange hair, which is typically called "red" or "ginger" hair. Pheomelanin is also present in the skin, and redheads consequently often have a more pinkish hue to their skin as well. Exposure of the skin to ultraviolet light increases pheomelanin content, as it does for eumelanin; but rather than absorbing light, pheomelanin within the hair and skin reflect yellow to red light, which may increase damage from UV radiation exposure.

Pheomelanin production is highly dependent on cysteine availability, which is transported into the melanosome, reacting with dopaquinone to form cys-dopa. Cys-dopa then undergoes several transformations before forming pheomelanin. In chemical terms, pheomelanins differ from eumelanins in that the oligomer structure incorporates benzothiazine and benzothiazole units that are produced, instead of DHI and DHICA, when the amino acid L-cysteine is present.

Pheomelanins, unlike eumelanins, are rare in lower organisms with claims they are an "evolutionary innovation in the tetrapod lineage" but recent research finds them also in some fish.

=== Neuromelanin ===
Neuromelanin (NM) is an insoluble polymer pigment produced in specific populations of catecholaminergic neurons in the brain. Humans have the largest amount of NM, which is present in lesser amounts in other primates, and totally absent in many other species. The biological function remains unknown, although human NM has been shown to efficiently bind transition metals such as iron, as well as other potentially toxic molecules. Therefore, it may play crucial roles in apoptosis and the related Parkinson's disease.

=== Other forms of melanins ===
Up until the 1960s, melanin was classified into eumelanin and pheomelanin. However, in 1955, a melanin associated with nerve cells was discovered, neuromelanin. In 1972 a water-soluble form, pyomelanin, was discovered, derived from the oxidation of homogentisic acid. In 1976, allomelanin, the fifth form of the melanins, was found in nature. It is derived from the oxidation of compounds such as 1,8-dihydroxynaphthalene, 1,4,6,7,9,12-hexahydroxyperylene-3,10-quinone, and catechol.

==== Peptidomelanin ====
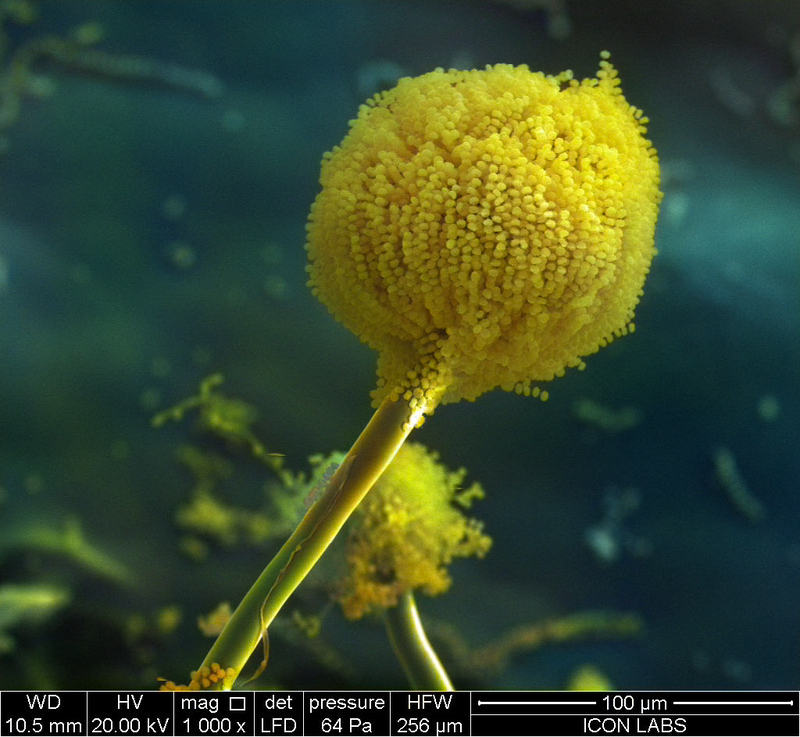
SEM micrograph of Aspergillus niger (strain: melanoliber) conodiophore possessing a large number of small conidospores (colorized). These spores release peptidomelanin into the surrounding medium during germination.

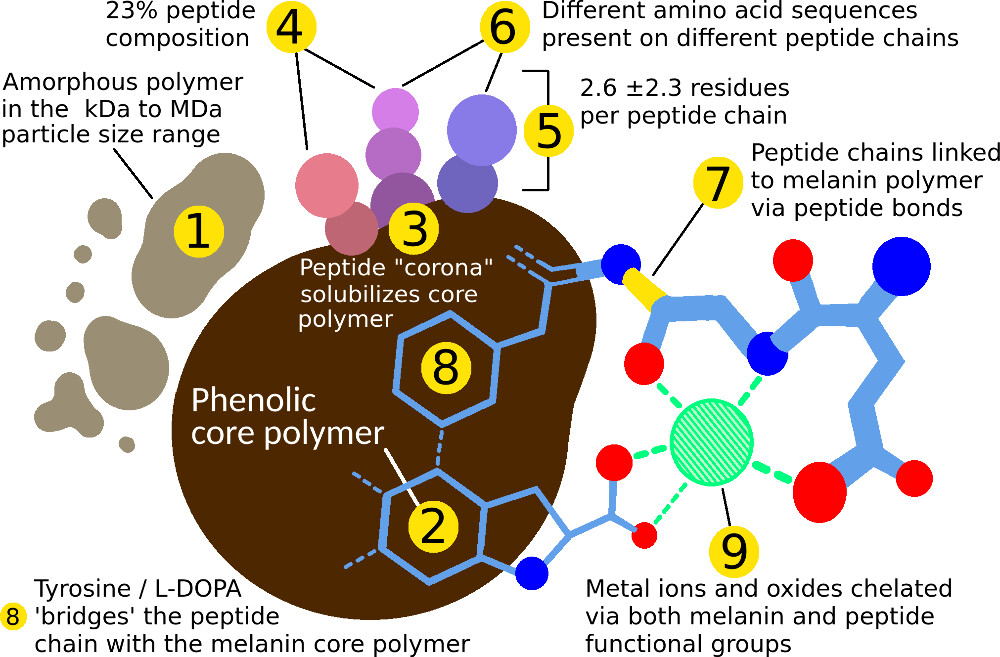
The biochemical composition of peptidomelanin

Peptidomelanin is another water-soluble form of melanin. It was found to be secreted into the surrounding medium by germinating Aspergillus niger (strain: melanoliber) spores. Peptidomelanin release is triggered after exposure to extracellular peptides in the environment. Peptidomelanin is formed as a copolymer between L-DOPA eumelanin and short peptides that form a 'corona', that are responsible for the substance's solubility. The peptide chains are linked to the L-DOPA core polymer via peptide bonds. This led to a proposed biosynthetic process involving the hydroxylation of tyrosinylated or cysteinylated peptides formed via proteases during sporogenesis, which are then incorporated autoxidatively into a growing L-DOPA core polymer.

Peptidomelanin is synthesized using a broad-spectrum copper oxidase. This enzyme possesses a type-3 di-copper catalytic centre housed in a large-solvent accessible cavity. This enzyme has been shown to oxidize the thiol groups of cysteinylated peptides, allowing them to copolymerize with an L-DOPA-derived core polymer. Peptidomelanin may also be synthesized using chemical processes.

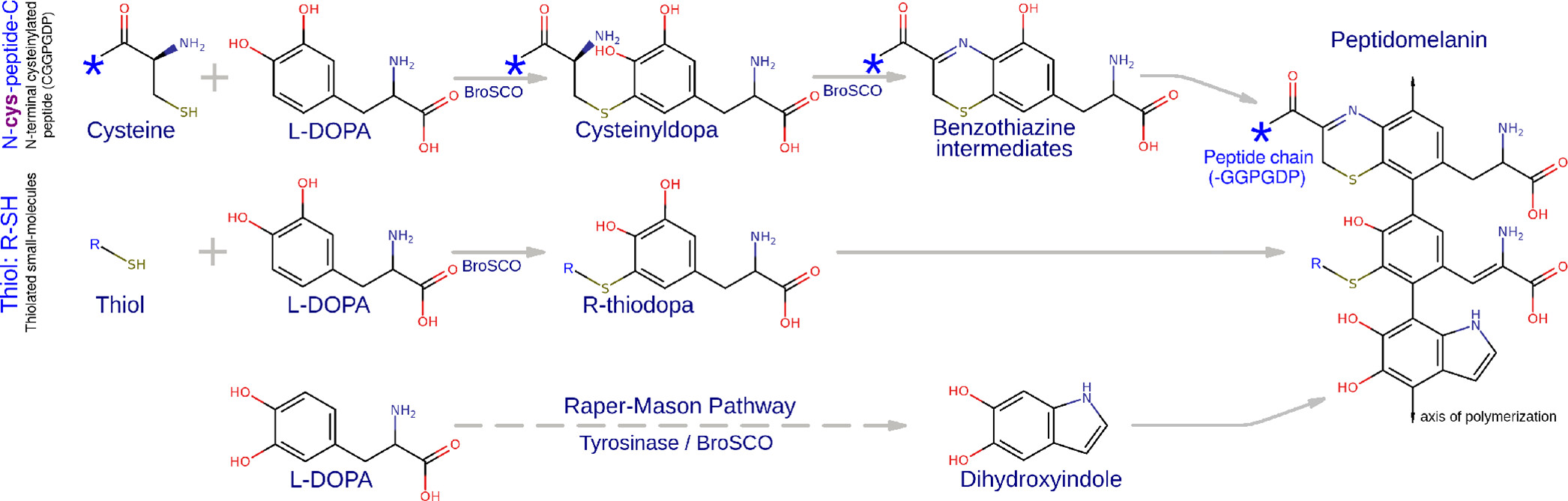
The Srivatsan pathway for peptidomelanin biosynthesis.

==== Selenomelanin ====
It is possible to enrich melanin with selenium instead of sulphur. This selenium analogue of pheomelanin has been successfully synthesized through chemical and biosynthetic routes using selenocystine as a feedstock. Due to selenium's higher atomic number, the obtained selenomelanin can be expected to provide better protection against ionising radiation as compared to the other known forms of melanin. This protection has been demonstrated with radiation experiments on human cells and bacteria, opening up the possibility of applications in space travel.

==== Trichochromes ====
Trichochromes (formerly called trichosiderins) are pigments produced from the same metabolic pathway as the eumelanins and pheomelanins, but unlike those molecules they have low molecular weight. They occur in some red human hair.

== Humans ==
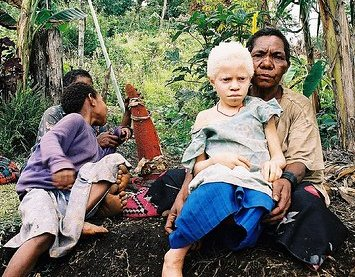
Albinism occurs when melanocytes produce little melanin. In the foreground of this photo, taken in Papua New Guinea, is a child who has albinism.

In humans, melanin is the primary determinant of skin color. It is also found in hair, the pigmented tissue underlying the iris of the eye, and the stria vascularis of the inner ear. In the brain, tissues with melanin include the medulla and pigment-bearing neurons within areas of the brainstem, such as the locus coeruleus. It also occurs in the zona reticularis of the adrenal gland.

The melanin in the skin is produced by melanocytes, which are found in the basal layer of the epidermis. Although, in general, human beings possess a similar concentration of melanocytes in their skin, the melanocytes in some individuals and ethnic groups produce variable amounts of melanin. The ratio of eumelanin (76%) and pheomelanin (24%) in the epidermis is constant regardless of the degree of pigmentation. Some humans have very little or no melanin synthesis in their bodies, a condition known as albinism.

Because melanin is an aggregate of smaller component molecules, there are many different types of melanin with different proportions and bonding patterns of these component molecules. Both pheomelanin and eumelanin are found in human skin and hair, but eumelanin is the most abundant melanin in humans, as well as the form most likely to be deficient in albinism.

== Other organisms ==
Melanins have very diverse roles and functions in various organisms. A form of melanin makes up the ink used by many cephalopods (see cephalopod ink) as a defense mechanism against predators. Melanins also protect microorganisms, such as bacteria and fungi, against stresses that involve cell damage such as UV radiation from the sun and reactive oxygen species. Melanin also protects against damage from high temperatures, chemical stresses (such as heavy metals and oxidizing agents), and biochemical threats (such as host defenses against invading microbes). Therefore, in many pathogenic microbes (for example, in Cryptococcus neoformans, a fungus) melanins appear to play important roles in virulence and pathogenicity by protecting the microbe against immune responses of its host. In invertebrates, a major aspect of the innate immune defense system against invading pathogens involves melanin. Within minutes after infection, the microbe is encapsulated within melanin (melanization), and the generation of free radical byproducts during the formation of this capsule is thought to aid in killing them. Some types of fungi, called radiotrophic fungi, appear to be able to use melanin as a photosynthetic pigment that enables them to capture gamma rays and harness this energy for growth.

In fish, melanin occurs not only in the skin but also in internal organs such as eyes. Most fish species use eumelanin, but Stegastes apicalis and Cyprinus carpio use pheomelanin instead.

The darker feathers of birds owe their color to melanin and are less readily degraded by bacteria than unpigmented ones or those containing carotenoid pigments. Feathers that contain melanin are also 39% more resistant to abrasion than those that do not because melanin granules help fill the space between the keratin strands that form feathers. Pheomelanin synthesis in birds implies the consumption of cysteine, a semi‐essential amino acid that is necessary for the synthesis of the antioxidant glutathione (GSH) but that may be toxic if in excess in the diet. Indeed, many carnivorous birds, which have a high protein content in their diet, exhibit pheomelanin‐based coloration.

Melanin is also important in mammalian pigmentation. The coat pattern of mammals is determined by the agouti gene which regulates the distribution of melanin. The mechanisms of the gene have been extensively studied in mice to provide an insight into the diversity of mammalian coat patterns.

Melanin in arthropods has been observed to be deposited in layers thus producing a Bragg reflector of alternating refractive index. When the scale of this pattern matches the wavelength of visible light, structural coloration arises: giving a number of species an iridescent color.

Arachnids are one of the few groups in which melanin has not been easily detected, though researchers found data suggesting spiders do in fact produce melanin.

Some moth species, including the wood tiger moth, convert resources to melanin to enhance their thermoregulation. As the wood tiger moth has populations over a large range of latitudes, it has been observed that more northern populations showed higher rates of melanization. In both yellow and white male phenotypes of the wood tiger moth, individuals with more melanin had a heightened ability to trap heat but an increased predation rate due to a weaker and less effective aposematic signal.

Melanin may protect Drosophila flies and mice against DNA damage from non-UV radiation.

=== Plants ===
Chemical structure of indole-5,6-quinone

Melanin produced by plants are sometimes referred to as 'catechol melanins' as they can yield catechol on alkali fusion. It is commonly seen in the enzymatic browning of fruits such as bananas. Chestnut shell melanin can be used as an antioxidant and coloring agent. Biosynthesis involves the oxidation of indole-5,6-quinone by the tyrosinase type polyphenol oxidase from tyrosine and catecholamines leading to the formation of catechol melanin. Despite this many plants contain compounds which inhibit the production of melanins.

== Interpretation as a single monomer ==
3,8-Dimethyl-2,7-dihydrobenzo[1,2,3-cd:4,5,6-c′d′]diindole-4,5,9,10-tetrone

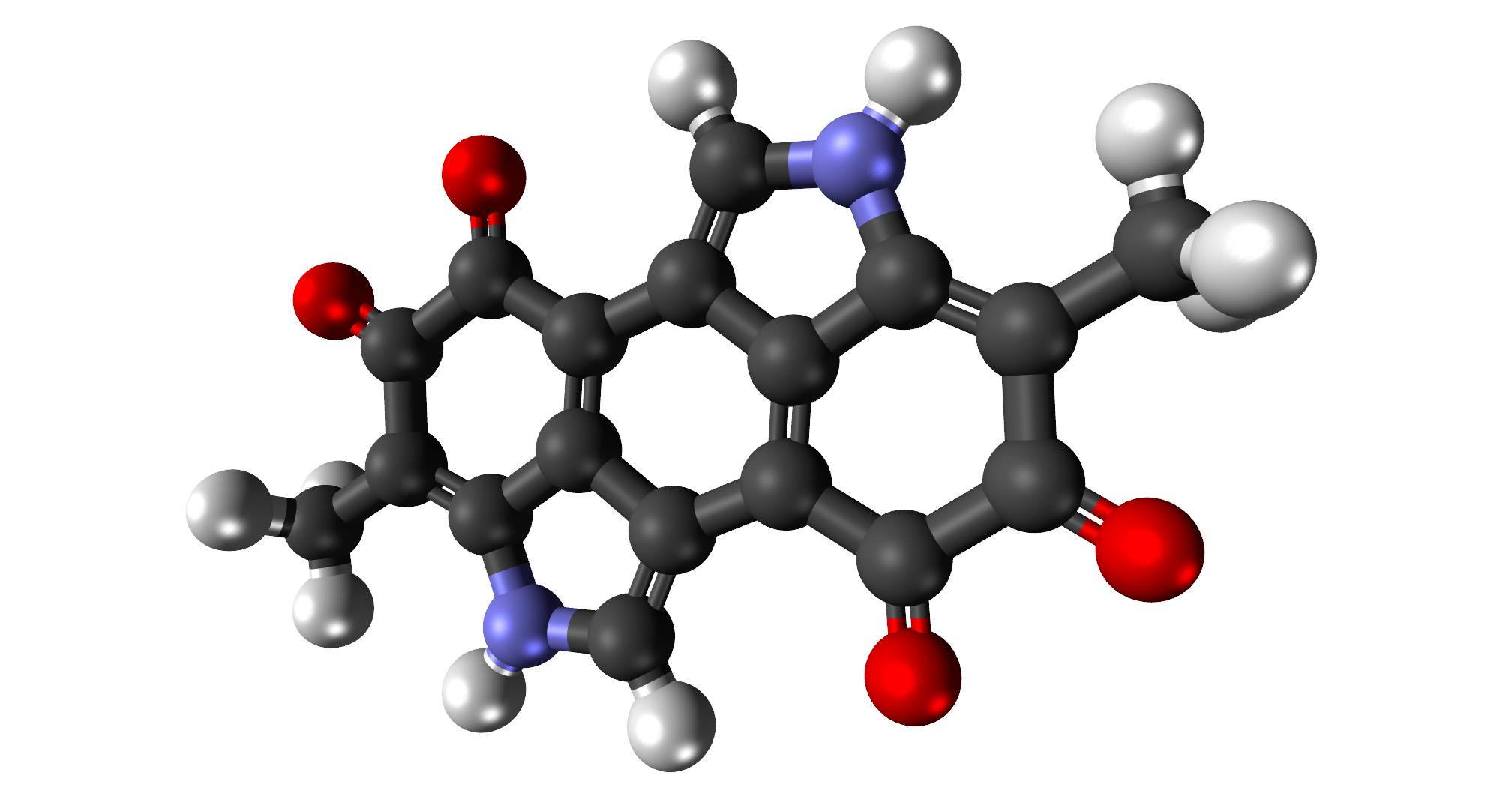

Names
- Preferred IUPAC name 3,8-Dimethyl-2,7-dihydrobenzo[1,2,3-cd:4,5,6-c′d′]diindole-4,5,9,10-tetrone

Identifiers
| CAS Number | 8049-97-6 |
| 3D model (JSmol) | Interactive image |
| ChEBI | CHEBI:89634 |
| ChEMBL | ChEMBL4283875 |
| ChemSpider | 4884931 |
| EC Number | 232-473-6 |
| PubChem CID | 6325610 |
| UNII | T6T74PN7VH |
- InChI: InChI=1S/C18H10N2O4/c1-5-13-9-7(3-19-13)12-10-8(11(9)17(23)15(5)21)4-20-14(10)6(2)16(22)18(12)24/h3-4,19-20H,1-2H3 Key: XUMBMVFBXHLACL-UHFFFAOYSA-N
- SMILES: CC1=C2C3=C(C4=CNC5=C(C(=O)C(=O)C(=C45)C3=CN2)C)C(=O)C1=O

Properties
| Chemical formula | C_{18}H_{10}N_{2}O_{4} |
| Molar mass | 318.288 g·mol^{−1} |
| Density | 1.6 to 1.8 g/cm^{3} |
| Melting point | < −20 °C (−4 °F; 253 K) |
| Boiling point | 450 to 550 °C (842 to 1,022 °F; 723 to 823 K) |
- Except where otherwise noted, data are given for materials in their standard state (at 25 °C [77 °F], 100 kPa). Infobox references

It is now understood that melanins do not have a single structure or stoichiometry. Nonetheless, chemical databases such as PubChem include structural and empirical formulae; typically 3,8-Dimethyl-2,7-dihydrobenzo[1,2,3-cd:4,5,6-c′d′]diindole-4,5,9,10-tetrone, empirical formula C_{18}H_{10}N_{2}O_{4}. This can be thought of as a single monomer that accounts for the measured elemental composition and some properties of melanin, but is unlikely to be found in nature. Solano claims that this misleading trend stems from a report of an empirical formula in 1948, but provides no other historical detail.

== Biosynthetic pathways ==
The first step of the biosynthetic pathway for both eumelanins and pheomelanins is catalysed by tyrosinase.

Tyrosine → DOPA → dopaquinone

Dopaquinone can combine with cysteine by two pathways to benzothiazines and pheomelanins

dopaquinone + cysteine → 5-S-cysteinyldopa → benzothiazine intermediate → pheomelanin

dopaquinone + cysteine → 2-S-cysteinyldopa → benzothiazine intermediate → pheomelanin

Also, dopaquinone can be converted to leucodopachrome and follow two more pathways to the eumelanins

dopaquinone → leucodopachrome → dopachrome → 5,6-dihydroxyindole-2-carboxylic acid → quinone → eumelanin

dopaquinone → leucodopachrome → dopachrome → 5,6-dihydroxyindole → quinone → eumelanin

Detailed metabolic pathways can be found in the KEGG database (see External links).

L-tyrosine

L-DOPA

L-dopaquinone

L-leucodopachrome

L-dopachrome

== Microscopic appearance ==
Melanin is brown, non-refractile, and finely granular, with individual granules having a diameter of less than 800 nanometers. This differentiates melanin from common blood breakdown pigments, which are larger, chunky, and refractile, and range in color from green to yellow or red-brown. In heavily pigmented lesions, dense aggregates of melanin can obscure histologic detail. A dilute solution of potassium permanganate is an effective melanin bleach.

== Genetic disorders and disease states ==
There are approximately nine types of oculocutaneous albinism, which is mostly an autosomal recessive disorder. Certain ethnicities have higher incidences of different forms. For example, the most common type, called oculocutaneous albinism type 2 (OCA2), is especially frequent among people of black African descent and white Europeans. People with OCA2 usually have fair skin, but are often not as pale as OCA1. They (OCA2 or OCA1? see comments in History) have pale blonde to golden, strawberry blonde, or even brown hair, and most commonly blue eyes. 98.7–100% of modern Europeans are carriers of the derived allele SLC24A5, a known cause of nonsyndromic oculocutaneous albinism. It is an autosomal recessive disorder characterized by a congenital reduction or absence of melanin pigment in the skin, hair, and eyes. The estimated frequency of OCA2 among African-Americans is 1 in 10,000, which contrasts with a frequency of 1 in 36,000 in European Americans. In some African nations, the frequency of the disorder is even higher, ranging from 1 in 2,000 to 1 in 5,000. Another form of Albinism, the "yellow oculocutaneous albinism", appears to be more prevalent among the Amish, who are of primarily Swiss and German ancestry. People with this IB variant of the disorder commonly have white hair and skin at birth, but rapidly develop normal skin pigmentation in infancy.

Ocular albinism affects not only eye pigmentation but visual acuity, as well. People with albinism typically test poorly, within the 20/60 to 20/400 range. In addition, two forms of albinism, with approximately 1 in 2,700 most prevalent among people of Puerto Rican origin, are associated with mortality beyond melanoma-related deaths.

The connection between albinism and deafness is well known, though poorly understood. In his 1859 treatise On the Origin of Species, Charles Darwin observed that "cats which are entirely white and have blue eyes are generally deaf". In humans, hypopigmentation and deafness occur together in the rare Waardenburg's syndrome, predominantly observed among the Hopi in North America. The incidence of albinism in Hopi Indians has been estimated as approximately 1 in 200 individuals. Similar patterns of albinism and deafness have been found in other mammals, including dogs and rodents. However, a lack of melanin per se does not appear to be directly responsible for deafness associated with hypopigmentation, as most individuals lacking the enzymes required to synthesize melanin have normal auditory function. Instead, the absence of melanocytes in the stria vascularis of the inner ear results in cochlear impairment, though the reasons for this are not fully understood.

In Parkinson's disease, a disorder that affects neuromotor functioning, there is decreased neuromelanin in the substantia nigra and locus coeruleus as a consequence of specific dropping out of dopaminergic and noradrenergic pigmented neurons. This results in diminished dopamine and norepinephrine synthesis. While no correlation between race and the level of neuromelanin in the substantia nigra has been reported, the significantly lower incidence of Parkinson's in blacks than in whites has "prompt[ed] some to suggest that cutaneous melanin might somehow serve to protect the neuromelanin in substantia nigra from external toxins."

In addition to melanin deficiency, the molecular weight of the melanin polymer may be decreased by various factors such as oxidative stress, exposure to light, perturbation in its association with melanosomal matrix proteins, changes in pH, or in local concentrations of metal ions. A decreased molecular weight or a decrease in the degree of polymerization of ocular melanin has been proposed to turn the normally anti-oxidant polymer into a pro-oxidant. In its pro-oxidant state, melanin has been suggested to be involved in the causation and progression of macular degeneration and melanoma. Rasagiline, an important monotherapy drug in Parkinson's disease, has melanin binding properties, and melanoma tumor reducing properties.

Higher eumelanin levels also can be a disadvantage, however, beyond a higher disposition toward vitamin D deficiency. Dark skin is a complicating factor in the laser removal of port-wine stains. Effective in treating white skin, in general, lasers are less successful in removing port-wine stains in people of Asian or African descent. Higher concentrations of melanin in darker-skinned individuals simply diffuse and absorb the laser radiation, inhibiting light absorption by the targeted tissue. In a similar manner, melanin can complicate laser treatment of other dermatological conditions in people with darker skin.

Freckles and moles are formed where there is a localized concentration of melanin in the skin. They are highly associated with pale skin.

Nicotine has an affinity for melanin-containing tissues because of its precursor function in melanin synthesis or its irreversible binding of melanin. This has been suggested to underlie the increased nicotine dependence and lower smoking cessation rates in darker pigmented individuals.

== Human adaptations ==
=== Physiology ===
Melanocytes insert granules of melanin into specialized cellular vesicles called melanosomes. These are then transferred into the keratinocyte cells of the human epidermis. The melanosomes in each recipient cell accumulate atop the cell nucleus, where they protect the nuclear DNA from mutations caused by the ionizing radiation of the sun's ultraviolet rays. In general, people whose ancestors lived for long periods in the regions of the globe near the equator have larger quantities of eumelanin in their skins. This makes their skins brown or black and protects them against high levels of exposure to the sun, which more frequently result in melanomas in lighter-skinned people.

Not all the effects of pigmentation are advantageous. Pigmentation increases the heat load in hot climates, and dark-skinned people absorb 30% more heat from sunlight than do very light-skinned people, although this factor may be offset by more profuse sweating. In cold climates dark skin entails more heat loss by radiation. Pigmentation also hinders synthesis of vitamin D. Since pigmentation appears to be not entirely advantageous to life in the tropics, other hypotheses about its biological significance have been advanced; for example a secondary phenomenon induced by adaptation to parasites and tropical diseases.

=== Evolutionary origins ===
Early humans evolved dark skin color, as an adaptation to a loss of body hair that increased the effects of UV radiation. Before the development of hairlessness, early humans might have had light skin underneath their fur, similar to that found in other primates. Anatomically modern humans evolved in Africa between 200,000 and 100,000 years ago, and then populated the rest of the world through migration between 80,000 and 50,000 years ago, in some areas interbreeding with certain archaic human species (Neanderthals, Denisovans, and possibly others). The first modern humans had darker skin, similar to modern indigenous Africans today. Following migration to Asia and Europe, the selective pressure for darker UV-protective skin decreased. This resulted in the current range of human skin color. Of the two common gene variants known to be associated with pale human skin, Mc1r does not appear to have undergone positive selection, while SLC24A5 has undergone positive selection.

=== Effects ===
As with peoples having migrated northward, those with light skin migrating toward the equator acclimatize to the much stronger solar radiation. Nature selects for less melanin when ultraviolet radiation is weak. Most people's skin darkens when exposed to UV light, giving them more protection when it is needed. This is the physiological purpose of sun tanning. Dark-skinned people, who produce more skin-protecting eumelanin, have a greater protection against sunburn and the development of melanoma, a potentially deadly form of skin cancer, as well as other health problems related to exposure to strong solar radiation, including the photodegradation of certain vitamins such as riboflavins, carotenoids, tocopherol, and folate.

Melanin in the eyes, in the iris and choroid, helps protect from ultraviolet and high-frequency visible light; people with blue, green, and grey eyes are more at risk of sun-related eye problems. Furthermore, the ocular lens yellows with age, providing added protection. However, the lens also becomes more rigid with age, losing most of its accommodation—the ability to change shape to focus from far to near—a detriment due probably to protein crosslinking caused by UV exposure.

Recent research suggests that melanin may serve a protective role other than photoprotection. Melanin is able to effectively chelate metal ions through its carboxylate and phenolic hydroxyl groups, often much more efficiently than the powerful chelating ligand ethylenediaminetetraacetate (EDTA). Thus, it may serve to sequester potentially toxic metal ions, protecting the rest of the cell. This hypothesis is supported by the fact that the loss of neuromelanin, observed in Parkinson's disease, is accompanied by an increase in iron levels in the brain.

== Physical properties and technological applications ==
Evidence exists for a highly cross-linked heteropolymer bound covalently to matrix scaffolding melanoproteins. It has been proposed that the ability of melanin to act as an antioxidant is directly proportional to its degree of polymerization or molecular weight. Suboptimal conditions for the effective polymerization of melanin monomers may lead to formation of pro-oxidant melanin with lower-molecular-weight, implicated in the causation and progression of macular degeneration and melanoma. Signaling pathways that upregulate melanization in the retinal pigment epithelium (RPE) also may be implicated in the downregulation of rod outer segment phagocytosis by the RPE. This phenomenon has been attributed in part to foveal sparing in macular degeneration.

=== Role in melanoma metastasis ===
Heavily pigmented melanoma cells have a Young's modulus of about 4.93 kPa, compared to non-pigmented cells, with a value of 0.98 kPa. The elasticity of melanoma cells is crucial to metastasis and growth; non-pigmented tumors were larger than pigmented tumors, and spread far more easily. Pigmented and non-pigmented cells are both present in melanoma tumors, so that they can both be drug-resistant and metastatic.

== See also ==
- Albino
- Albinism in biology
- Griscelli syndrome, a syndrome characterised by hypopigmentation
- Human skin color
- Melanin theory
- Melanism
- Melanogenesis, melanin production
- Risks and benefits of sun exposure
- Skin whitening
- Vitamin D
