= Hepatitis C vaccine =

Vaccine research

Vaccine description
- Target: Hepatitis C

Identifiers
- CAS Number: 1802325-64-9
- ChemSpider: none

A hepatitis C vaccine, a vaccine capable of protecting against the hepatitis C virus (HCV), is not yet available. Although vaccines exist for hepatitis A and hepatitis B, development of an HCV vaccine has presented challenges. No vaccine is currently available, but several vaccines are currently under development.

Most vaccines work through inducing an antibody response that targets the outer surfaces of viruses. However, the HCV virus is highly variable among strains and rapidly mutating, making an effective vaccine very difficult.

Another strategy which is different from a conventional vaccine is to induce the T cell arm of the immune response using viral vectors, adenoviral vectors that contain large parts of the HCV genome itself, to induce a T cell immune response against HCV. Most of the work to develop a T cell vaccine has been done against a particular genotype. There are six different genotypes which reflect differences in the structure of the virus. The first approved vaccine will likely only target genotypes 1a and 1b, which account for over 60% of chronic HCV infections worldwide. Likely, vaccines following the first approved vaccine will address other genotypes by prevalence.

VLP-based HCV vaccines are also subject of intensive research.

Since 2014, well-tolerated and extremely effective direct‐acting antiviral agents (DAAs) have been available which allows eradication of the disease in 8–12 weeks in most patients. While this has changed treatment options drastically for patients with HCV, it does not replace a vaccine that would prevent people from ever getting infected with the virus and will likely not be sufficient to eradicate HCV completely.

== Specific vaccines ==
As of 2020, Inovio Pharmaceuticals is developing a synthetic multi-antigen DNA vaccine covering HCV genotypes 1a and 1b and targeting the HCV antigens nonstructural protein 3 (NS3) and 4A (NS4A), as well as NS4B and NS5A proteins. Following immunization, rhesus macaques mounted strong HCV-specific T cell immune responses strikingly similar to those reported in patients who have cleared the virus on their own. The responses included strong HCV antigen-specific interferon-γ (IFN-γ), tumor necrosis factor-α (TNF-α), and interleukin-2 (IL-2) induction, robust CD4 and CD8 T cell proliferation, and induction of polyfunctional T cells. This vaccine is in Phase I clinical trial.

The major histocompatibility complex class II-associated invariant chain (CD74)—fused with a viral vector to a conserved region of the HCV genome—has been tested as an adjuvant for an HCV vaccine in a cohort of 17 healthy human volunteers. This experimental vaccine was well-tolerated, and those who received the adjuvanted vaccine had stronger anti-HCV immune responses (enhanced magnitude, breadth and proliferative capacity of anti-HCV-specific T helper cells) compared with volunteers who received the vaccine that lacked this adjuvant.
