= Labetuzumab govitecan =

Monoclonal antibody

Monoclonal antibody
- Type: Whole antibody
- Source: Humanized (from mouse)
- Target: carcinoembryonic antigen

Clinical data
- Other names: IMMU 130
- ATC code: none

Identifiers
- CAS Number: 1469876-18-3
- ChemSpider: none
- UNII: 8E3HI6QQ9J
- KEGG: D08936

Labetuzumab govitecan (IMMU-130) is an antibody–drug conjugate (ADC) that was investigated for the treatment of colorectal cancer. Labetuzumab has also been evaluated in patients with metastatic medullary thyroid carcinoma (MTC).

The parent antibody, labetuzumab, is a humanized IgG1 monoclonal antibody that selectively binds to carcinoembryonic antigen-related cell adhesion molecule 5 (CEACAM5). In the ADC, the antibody is covalently linked to SN-38, the active metabolite of the topoisomerase I inhibitor irinotecan.

The drug was developed by Immunomedics, Inc.
