= Phenylpyruvate decarboxylase =

Class of enzymes

Identifiers
- EC no.: 4.1.1.43
- CAS no.: 37289-45-5

Databases
- BRENDA: enzyme data
- ExPASy: NiceZyme view
- KEGG: enzyme entry
- MetaCyc: metabolic pathway
- Rhea: reactions
- PDB structures: RCSB PDB PDBe PDBsum
- Gene Ontology: AmiGO / QuickGO
Search
- PMC: articles
- PubMed: articles
- NCBI: proteins

Phenylpyruvate decarboxylase (EC 4.1.1.43) is an enzyme characterised from Achromobacter eurydice that catalyzes the decarboxylation of phenylpyruvic acid to phenylacetaldehyde and carbon dioxide:

phenylpyruvic acid
CO_{2}
phenylacetaldehyde

In yeast, thiamine pyrophosphate is used as a cofactor and the enzyme has a broad substrate range. Metabolic engineering has been used to optimise the production of aromatic chemicals. In the rhizobacteria, Azospirillum brasilense, the reaction is part of the pathway to auxins which promote plant growth.

This enzyme is a lyase, specifically a carboxy-lyase, which cleave carbon-carbon bonds. The systematic name of this enzyme class is phenylpyruvate carboxy-lyase (phenylacetaldehyde-forming). This enzyme is also called phenylpyruvate carboxy-lyase.

== Structural studies ==
As of late 2007, only one structure has been solved for this class of enzymes, with the PDB accession code PDB: 2NXW.
