= Macrophage migration inhibitory factor =

Protein-coding gene in the species Homo sapiens

MIF
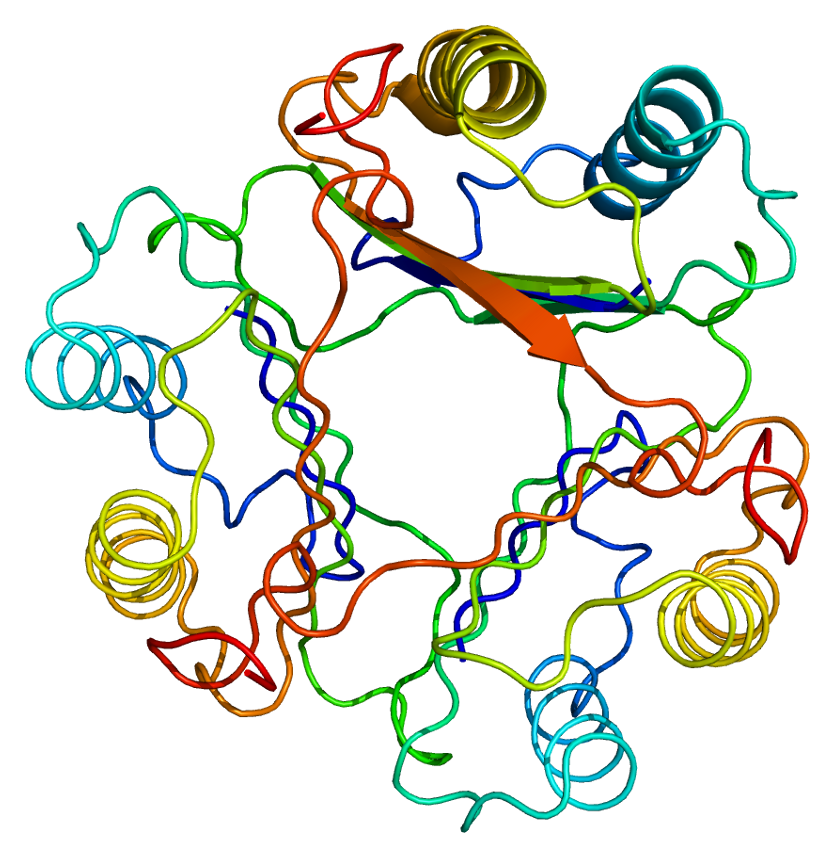

Identifiers
- Aliases: MIF, GIF, GLIF, Mmacrophage migration inhibitory factor (glycosylation-inhibiting factor), macrophage migration inhibitory factor
- External IDs: OMIM: 153620; MGI: 96982; GeneCards: MIF
Available structures
PDB	Ortholog search: PDBe RCSB
PDB	List of PDB id codes 1CA7, 1CGQ, 1GCZ, 1GD0, 1GIF, 1LJT, 1MIF, 1P1G, 2OOH, 2OOW, 2OOZ, 3B9S, 3CE4, 3DJH, 3DJI, 3HOF, 3IJG, 3IJJ, 3JSF, 3JSG, 3JTU, 3L5P, 3L5R, 3L5S, 3L5T, 3L5U, 3L5V, 3SMB, 3SMC, 3U18, 4ETG, 4EUI, 4EVG, 4F2K, 4GRN, 4GRO, 4GRP, 4GRQ, 4GRR, 4GRU, 3WNR, 3WNS, 3WNT, 4K9G, 4OSF, 4OYQ, 4P01, 4P0H, 4WR8, 4WRB, 4PKZ, 4PLU, 4TRF, 4TRU, 4XX7, 4XX8, 5BS9, 5BSC, 5BSI, 5EIZ, 5HVV, 5CG4, 5J7Q, 5BSJ, 5HVT, 4PKK, 5B4O, 5HVS, 5J7P
Enzyme activity
EC #	BRENDA	ExPASy	KEGG	MetaCyc
5.3.2.1	↗	↗	↗	↗
5.3.3.12	↗	↗	↗	↗

Gene location (Human)
Chr.	Chromosome 22 (human)
Band	22q11.23	Start	23,894,383 bp
Band	22q11.23	End	23,895,227 bp

Gene location (Mouse)
Chr.	Chromosome 10 (mouse)
Band	10 38.59 cM|10 C1	Start	75,695,187 bp
Band	10 38.59 cM|10 C1	End	75,696,074 bp
RNA expression pattern
Bgee	Human / Mouse (ortholog); Top expressed in: anterior pituitary; right adrenal gland; renal cortex; left adrenal gland; superior frontal gyrus; Brodmann area 9; left adrenal cortex; C1 segment; right uterine tube; right adrenal cortex / Top expressed in: embryo; embryo; otic placode; otic vesicle; somite; maxillary prominence; abdominal wall; mandibular prominence; epiblast; migratory enteric neural crest cell; More reference expression data
BioGPS	n/a
Gene ontology
Molecular function	cytokine activity; isomerase activity; protein binding; chemoattractant activity; phenylpyruvate tautomerase activity; signaling receptor binding; dopachrome isomerase activity; protease binding; cytokine receptor binding; identical protein binding
Cellular component	vesicle; myelin sheath; nucleoplasm; extracellular region; cell surface; extracellular exosome; cytoplasm; cytosol; secretory granule lumen; ficolin-1-rich granule lumen; extracellular space
Biological process	positive regulation of protein phosphorylation; negative regulation of intrinsic apoptotic signaling pathway in response to DNA damage by p53 class mediator; positive regulation of MAP kinase activity; carboxylic acid metabolic process; positive regulation of chemokine (C-X-C motif) ligand 2 production; immune system process; positive regulation of fibroblast proliferation; DNA damage response, signal transduction by p53 class mediator; negative regulation of apoptotic process; negative regulation of mature B cell apoptotic process; negative regulation of gene expression; positive regulation of peptidyl-serine phosphorylation; protein homotrimerization; positive regulation of lipopolysaccharide-mediated signaling pathway; cell surface receptor signaling pathway; negative regulation of DNA damage response, signal transduction by p53 class mediator; regulation of cell population proliferation; positive regulation of arachidonic acid secretion; positive regulation of B cell proliferation; positive regulation of peptidyl-tyrosine phosphorylation; positive regulation of prostaglandin secretion involved in immune response; prostaglandin biosynthetic process; innate immune response; negative regulation of myeloid cell apoptotic process; inflammatory response; cell population proliferation; positive regulation of phosphorylation; positive regulation of myeloid leukocyte cytokine production involved in immune response; leukocyte migration; regulation of macrophage activation; positive regulation of protein kinase A signaling; positive chemotaxis; neutrophil degranulation; interleukin-12-mediated signaling pathway; negative regulation of macrophage chemotaxis; positive regulation of tumor necrosis factor production; positive regulation of ERK1 and ERK2 cascade; regulation of signaling receptor activity
Sources:Amigo / QuickGO
Orthologs
Databases	NCBI: entry; OMA: entry
Species	Human	Mouse
Entrez	4282	17319
Ensembl	ENSG00000276701; ENSG00000240972	ENSMUSG00000033307
UniProt	P14174	P34884
RefSeq (mRNA)	NM_002415	NM_010798
RefSeq (protein)	NP_002406; NP_002406.1	NP_034928
Location (UCSC)	Chr 22: 23.89 – 23.9 Mb	Chr 10: 75.7 – 75.7 Mb
PubMed search
- Wikidata
View/Edit Human	View/Edit Mouse

Macrophage migration inhibitory factor (MIF)

Identifiers
- Symbol: MIF
- Pfam: PF01187
- InterPro: IPR001398
- PROSITE: PDOC00892
- SCOP2: 1mif / SCOPe / SUPFAM
Available protein structures:
- PDB: IPR001398 PF01187 (ECOD; PDBsum)
- AlphaFold: IPR001398; PF01187

Macrophage migration inhibitory factor (MIF), also known as glycosylation-inhibiting factor (GIF), L-dopachrome isomerase, or phenylpyruvate tautomerase is a protein that in humans is encoded by the MIF gene. MIF is an important regulator of innate immunity. The MIF protein superfamily also includes a second member with functionally related properties, the D-dopachrome tautomerase (D-DT). CD74 is a surface receptor for MIF.

Bacterial antigens stimulate white blood cells to release MIF into the blood stream. The circulating MIF binds to CD74 on other immune cells to trigger an acute immune response. Hence, MIF is classified as an inflammatory cytokine. Furthermore, glucocorticoids also stimulate white blood cells to release MIF and hence MIF partially counteracts the inhibitory effects that glucocorticoids have on the immune system. Finally trauma activates the anterior pituitary gland to release MIF.

== Structure ==
Macrophage migration inhibitory factor assembles into a trimer composed of three identical subunits. Each of these monomers contain two antiparallel alpha helices and a four-stranded beta sheet. The monomers surround a central channel with 3-fold rotational symmetry.

MIF contains two motifs with catalytic activity. The first is a 27 amino acid motif located at the N-terminus functions as a phenylpyruvate tautomerase that can catalyze the conversion of 2-carboxy-2,3-dihydroindole-5,6-quinone (dopachrome) into 5,6-dihydroxyindole-2-carboxylic acid (DHICA). MIF also contains a Cys-Ala-Leu-Cys catalytic site between residues 57 and 60 that appears to function as a disulfide reductase.

== Mechanism of action ==
MIF binds to CD74, inducing its phosphorylation and the recruitment of CD44 which then activates non-receptor tyrosine kinases, leading ultimately to extracellular signal-regulated kinase phosphorylation. In addition to ERK, stimulation of CD74 activates other signaling pathways such PI3K-Akt, NF-κB, and AMP-activated protein kinase (AMPK) pathways.

== Function ==
This gene encodes a lymphokine involved in cell-mediated immunity, immunoregulation, and inflammation. MIF plays a role in the regulation of macrophage function in host defense through the suppression of anti-inflammatory effects of glucocorticoids. This lymphokine and the JAB1 protein form a complex in the cytosol near the peripheral plasma membrane, which may indicate a role in integrin signaling pathways.

Cytokines play an important role in promoting wound healing and tissue repair. Cell injury results in MIF release which then interacts with CD74. MIF-CD74 signaling activates pro-survival and proliferative pathways that protects the host during injury.

== Interactions ==
Macrophage migration inhibitory factor has been reported to interact with:

- BNIPL,
- CD74,
- COPS5,
- CXCR4, and
- RPS19.

== Clinical significance ==
MIF is a potential drug target for sepsis, rheumatoid arthritis, and cancer.

== Parasite-produced MIF homologs ==
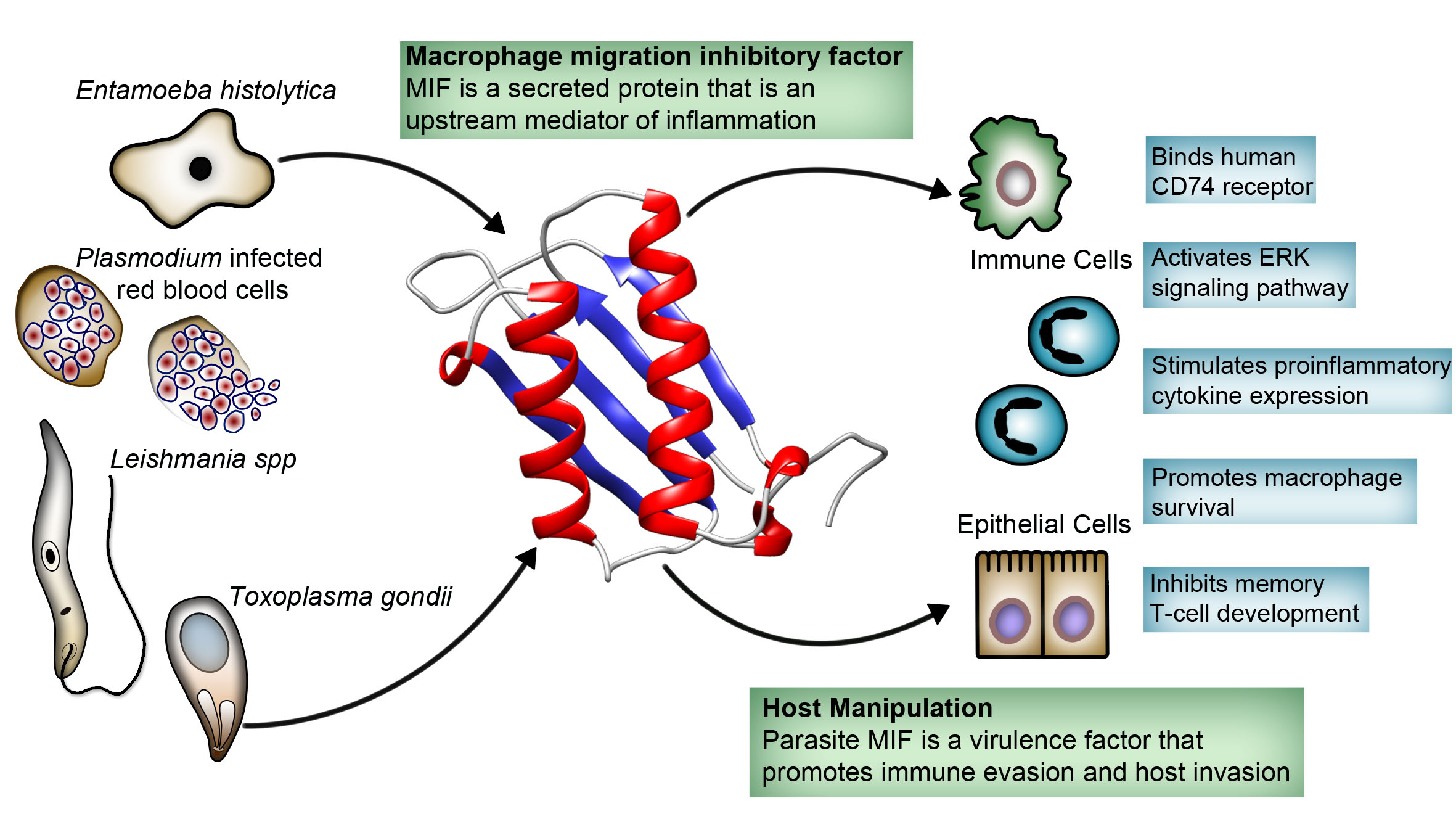
Parasite-Produced MIF Cytokine in Immune Evasion, Invasion, and Pathogenesis

Multiple protozoan parasites produce homologs MIF that have similar inflammatory functions to human MIF, and play a role in their pathogenesis, invasion and immune evasion. A preclinical study showed that blocking parasite MIF improves outcome in severe protozoan infections. Examples of protozoans with MIF homologs that have been reported:

- Entamoeba histolytica,
- Plasmodium falciparum,
- Toxoplasma gondii,
- Leishmania,
- Trichomonas vaginalis.
