= DCF Advertising =

American advertising agency

- Company type: Private
- Industry: Advertising
- Founded: New York City (2000)
- Headquarters: U.S.
- Area served: Worldwide
- Key people: James Deangelo; Partner & Founder; John Fortune; Partner Ed O'Callaghan; Founder
- Website: dcfadvertising.com

DCF Advertising (corporate name, Mind4, Inc.) is a creative agency based in Midtown Manhattan, New York City. The agency specializes in public health and social marketing. The agency was founded in March 2000 by James DeAngelo. Partner John Fortune joined the firm in 2003.

== Campaigns ==
DCF has been involved in the creation of several high-profile and sometimes controversial public health campaigns.

=== NYC Condom: "Get Some" (2007) ===
In early 2007, the New York City Department of Health launched the first municipally branded condom in the nation: NYC Condom. DCF designed the packaging and advertising.

=== NYC Anti-Tobacco: "Cigarettes Are Eating You Alive" (2007/2008) ===
DCF launched a graphic anti-smoking ad showing diseased organs and computer-generated imagery of an unhealthy human body. New York Post columnist Andrea Peyser commented on the graphic nature in her column on March 17, 2008.

=== NYC Homeless Services: "Give the Homeless Change They Can Use" (2008) ===
Mayor Michael Bloomberg announced the launch of a highly visible subway ad campaign designed to increase awareness of New York City's high rate of homelessness and encourage New Yorkers to call 311 when they see a homeless person in need.

=== NYC Anti-Tobacco: "Marie" (2008) ===
On April 16, 2008, the New York City Department of Health launched a nicotine patch and gum program along with a series of anti-tobacco ads designed by DCF. They feature a 58-year-old woman and longtime smoker named "Marie." In TV commercials, radios spots, subway cars, and subway ads, "Marie" explains the damage smoking has done to her. She talks about the nearly 20 amputations she has undergone after developing Buerger's disease from smoking.
