= Benzothiazine =

2H-isomer
4H-isomer
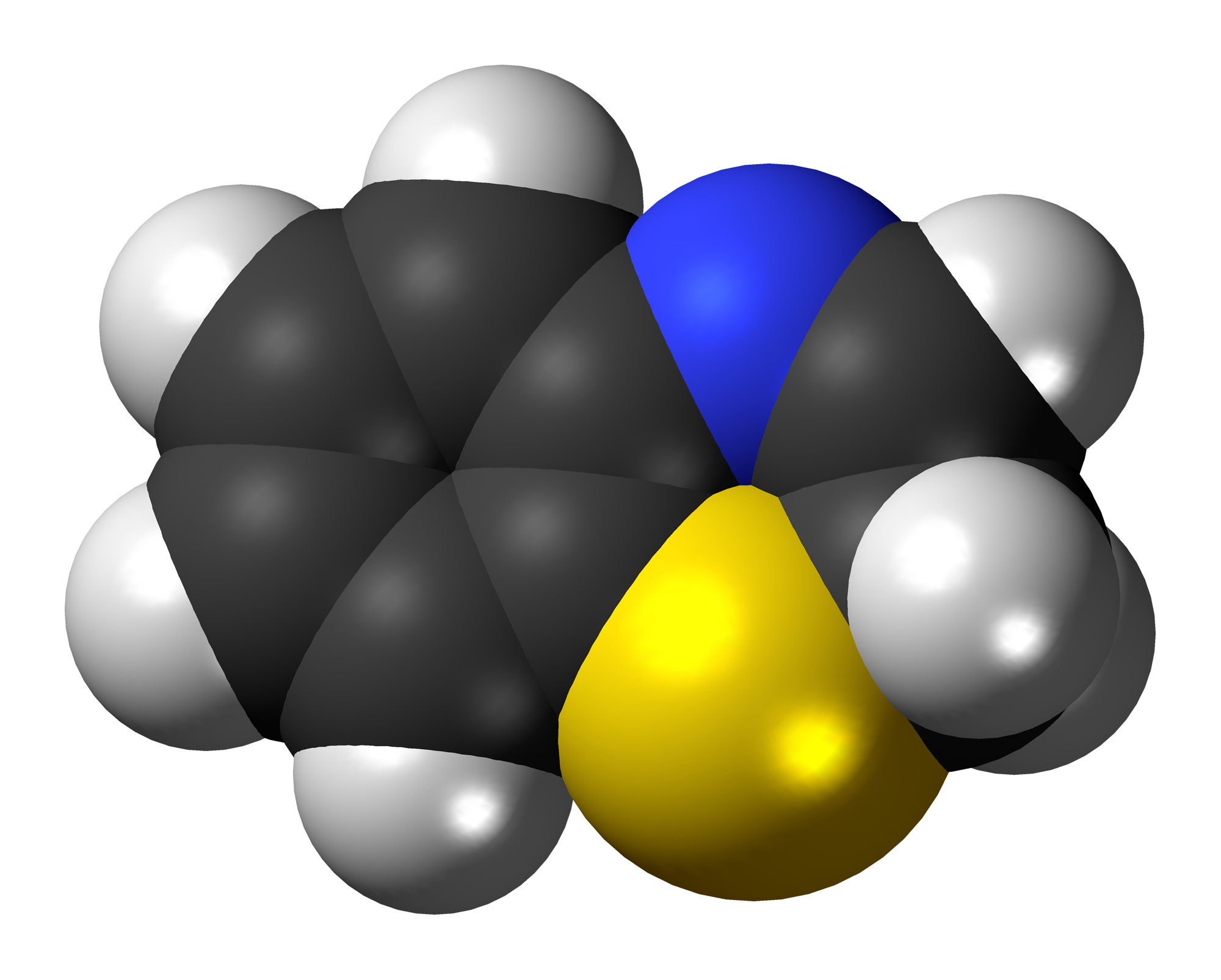

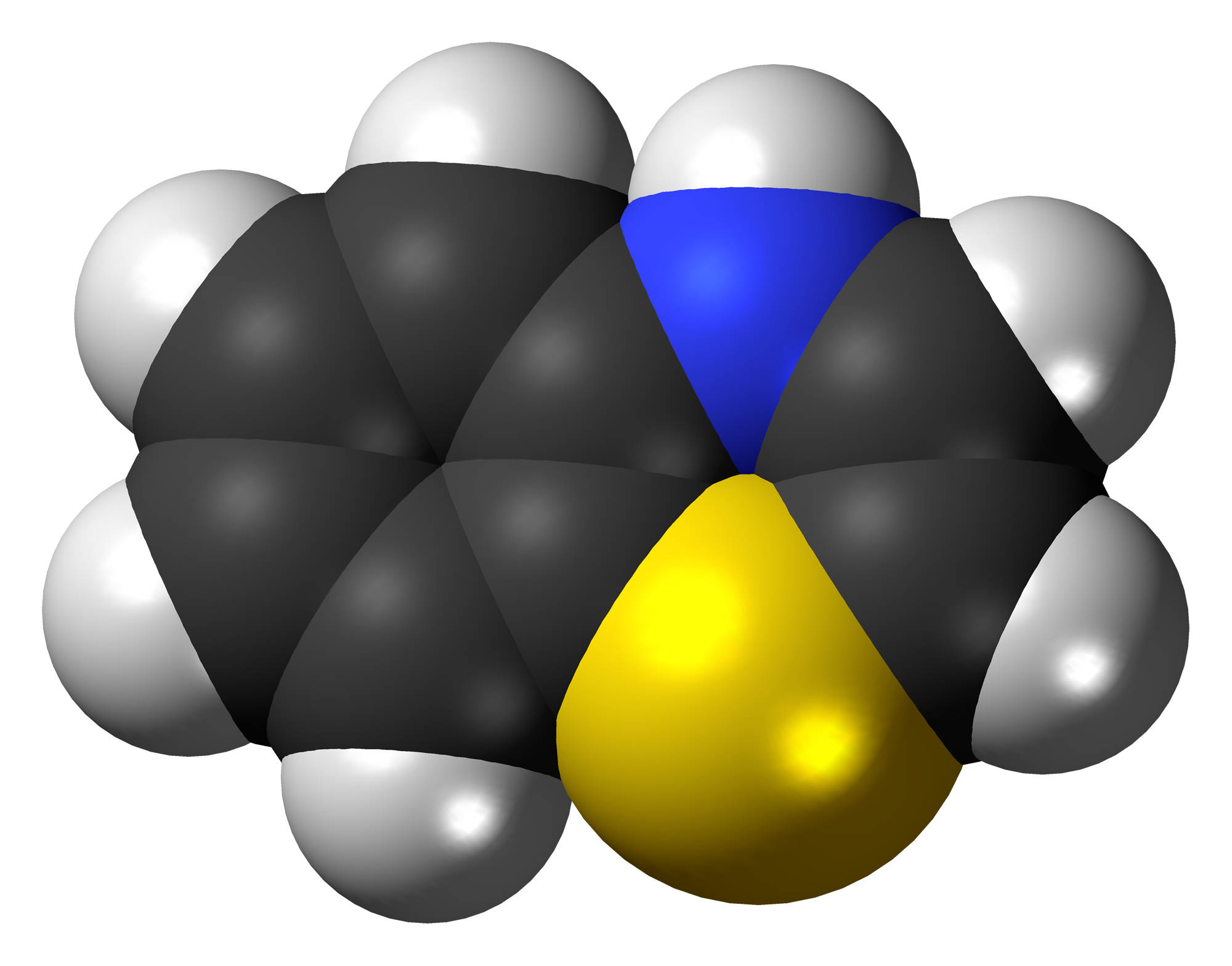

Names
- IUPAC name 2H-1,4-benzothiazine
- Other names 1,4-benzothiazine

Identifiers
CAS Number	2H-isomer: 255-17-4; 4H-isomer: 255-16-3
3D model (JSmol)	2H-isomer: Interactive image; 4H-isomer: Interactive image
ChemSpider	2H-isomer: 2345079; 4H-isomer: 11484476
PubChem CID	2H-isomer: 3088997; 4H-isomer: 12805862
UNII	2H-isomer: LP8A4HNV72
CompTox Dashboard (EPA)	2H-isomer: DTXSID70180186
- InChI: InChI=1S/C8H7NS/c1-2-4-8-7(3-1)9-5-6-10-8/h1-5H,6H2 Key: FBOSKQVOIHEWAX-UHFFFAOYSA-N; 4H-isomer: InChI=1S/C8H7NS/c1-2-4-8-7(3-1)9-5-6-10-8/h1-6,9H; Key: ZLILRRGWBOKBIG-UHFFFAOYSA-N
- SMILES: 2H-isomer: N=1c2c(SCC=1)cccc2; 4H-isomer: c1ccc2S/C=C\Nc2c1

Properties
Chemical formula	C_{8}H_{7}NS
Molar mass	149.21288
- Except where otherwise noted, data are given for materials in their standard state (at 25 °C [77 °F], 100 kPa). verify (what is ?) Infobox references

Benzothiazine is a heterocyclic compound consisting of a benzene ring attached to the 6-membered heterocycle thiazine. The name is applied to both the 2H- and 4H-isomers of the molecule.

2,1-Benzothiazine, a type of benzothiazines was first reported in the 1960s. Subsequently, their preparation and intensive biological and physiological studies have been reported. In recent years, 2,1-benzothiazines have been of enormous interest to synthetic chemists. An enantioselective synthesis of such benzothiazines has been developed by Harmata and Hong who have formulated transformations of these compounds designed to target chiral, non-racemic building blocks as well as natural products.

== See also ==
- Phenothiazine has an additional benzene ring
- Benzothiazole is another heterocycle containing nitrogen and sulfur
