= Direct Consular Filing =

Direct Consular Filing (DCF) is a process related to immigration to the United States whereby Form I-130 (Petition for Alien Relative), I-360 (Petition for Amerasian, Widow(er), or Special Immigrant), or I-600 (Petition to Classify Orphan as an Immediate Relative), is filed with a United States embassy or consulate in another country rather than with the United States Citizenship and Immigration Services lockbox or service center facilities located within the US. The approved form can then be used to obtain an IR or CR visa within the same country. DCF is available only under exceptional circumstances and can only be done in the country where the petitioner (who, in the case of Forms I-130 and I-600, is distinct from the eventual visa applicant) legally resides.

== Conditions for Direct Consular Filing ==
=== Official rules ===
The regular application process for people outside the United States who wish an approval for Form I-130, I-360, or I-600 is to submit the application to the USCIS lockbox facility in Chicago, Illinois. However, there are some exceptions:

- For Form I-130 petitions, U.S. Embassies and Consulates may accept I-130 petition filings from petitioners who believe they have exceptional situations that would merit an exception from filing by mail to the USCIS Chicago Lockbox. Petitioners who believe that their situation merits an exception may contact the nearest U.S. Embassy or Consulate to request an exception and explain their circumstances in detail. Each request for an exception will be evaluated individually and must be authorized by the USCIS office that is responsible for that specific U.S. embassy or consulate.
- For Form I-360 and Form I-600, applications will be accepted by the embassy or consulate provided there is no USCIS office in the country.

The DCF petitioner must reside legally in the consular district of the U.S. Embassy or Consulate at which he or she is requesting to file. Further, a visa applicant for whom a petition is filed with a U.S. Embassy or Consulate must be able to remain in the country where the embassy or consulate is located for the time it takes to process the visa, since a petition approved by an embassy or consulate can only be used to apply for a visa from the same embassy or consulate.

=== Consulates where DCF is available and the rules used by these consulates ===
The embassy or consulate that processes the Form I-130 petition may differ from the one whose consular district the petitioner applies from (which is also where the applicant will appear for the visa interview), because not all embassies or consulates in a country can process DCF petitions. For instance, in India, only the Delhi embassy can process DCF petitions.
