= Milatuzumab =

Monoclonal antibody

Monoclonal antibody
- Type: Whole antibody
- Source: Humanized (from mouse)
- Target: CD74

Clinical data
- ATC code: none

Identifiers
- CAS Number: 899796-83-9
- ChemSpider: none
- UNII: 2OP4E0GC6V
- KEGG: D08944

Chemical and physical data
- Formula: C_{6518}H_{10066}N_{1758}O_{2020}S_{40}
- Molar mass: 146658.91 g·mol^{−1}

Milatuzumab (or hLL1) is an anti-CD74 humanized monoclonal antibody for the treatment of multiple myeloma non-Hodgkin's lymphoma and chronic lymphocytic leukemia.

The drug is the first anti-CD74 antibody that has entered into human testing and is currently being studied for the treatment of multiple myeloma. Milatuzumab has received orphan drug designation from the Food and Drug Administration in the United States for the treatment of multiple myeloma and chronic lymphocytic leukemia.

Milatuzumab was developed by Immunomedics, Inc, (Morris Plains NJ USA).

== CD74 ==
CD74 is present on a variety of hematological tumors and even on some solid cancers. It is present in limited amounts in normal tissues but widely found in leukemias, lymphomas and the vast majority of multiple myeloma cases. CD74 is involved in a cell-to-cell communication pathway that is critical for survival. When CD74 is blocked by milatuzumab, it can lead to cell death.

CD74 is an attractive target for a drug conjugate because of its rapid internalizing property.

In preclinical studies with human lymphomas and myelomas, both naked Milatuzumab and the Milatuzumab conjugated with doxorubicin, an antibody-drug conjugate or ADC, have demonstrated anti-lymphoma activity in-vivo.

== Antibody-drug Conjugates ==
=== IMMU-110 ===
hLL1-Dox
Milatuzumab has been linked to doxorubicin to form an antibody-drug conjugate or ADC (known as hLL1-Dox or IMMU-110) for treatment of relapsed multiple myeloma. A Phase I/II clinical trial to evaluate this milatuzumab-doxorubicin conjugate began in 2010, but was terminated in 2021 due to lack of efficacy.
