= DHICA =

Names
- Preferred IUPAC name 5,6-Dihydroxy-1H-indole-2-carboxylic acid

Identifiers
CAS Number	4790-08-3
3D model (JSmol)	Interactive image
ChemSpider	106648
MeSH	acid 5,6-dihydroxy-2-indolylcarboxylic acid
PubChem CID	119405
UNII	S6M6LZR326
CompTox Dashboard (EPA)	DTXSID40197327
- InChI: InChI=1S/C9H7NO4/c11-7-2-4-1-6(9(13)14)10-5(4)3-8(7)12/h1-3,10-12H,(H,13,14) Key: YFTGOBNOJKXZJC-UHFFFAOYSA-N; InChI=1/C9H7NO4/c11-7-2-4-1-6(9(13)14)10-5(4)3-8(7)12/h1-3,10-12H,(H,13,14) Key: YFTGOBNOJKXZJC-UHFFFAOYAX
- SMILES: C1=C2C=C(NC2=CC(=C1O)O)C(=O)O

Properties
Chemical formula	C_{9}H_{7}NO_{4}
Molar mass	193.158 g·mol^{−1}
- Except where otherwise noted, data are given for materials in their standard state (at 25 °C [77 °F], 100 kPa). Infobox references

DHICA (5,6-dihydroxyindole-2-carboxylic acid) is an intermediate in the biosynthesis of melanin. Tautomerization of DHICA forms dopachrome.
