= Dopachrome =

Names
- IUPAC name 5,6-Dioxo-2,3,5,6-tetrahydro-1H-indole-2-carboxylic acid

Identifiers
CAS Number	3571-34-4
3D model (JSmol)	Interactive image
ChemSpider	106643
MeSH	dopachrome
PubChem CID	119399
UNII	DWA58A6ZW7
CompTox Dashboard (EPA)	DTXSID30897147
- InChI: InChI=1S/C9H7NO4/c11-7-2-4-1-6(9(13)14)10-5(4)3-8(7)12/h2-3,6,10H,1H2,(H,13,14) Key: VJNCICVKUHKIIV-UHFFFAOYSA-N; InChI=1/C9H7NO4/c11-7-2-4-1-6(9(13)14)10-5(4)3-8(7)12/h2-3,6,10H,1H2,(H,13,14) Key: VJNCICVKUHKIIV-UHFFFAOYAH
- SMILES: C1C(NC2=CC(=O)C(=O)C=C21)C(=O)O

Properties
Chemical formula	C_{9}H_{7}NO_{4}
Molar mass	193.158 g·mol^{−1}
- Except where otherwise noted, data are given for materials in their standard state (at 25 °C [77 °F], 100 kPa). Infobox references

Dopachrome is a cyclization product of L-DOPA and is an intermediate in the biosynthesis of melanin. It may tautomerise to form DHICA.

== See also ==
- Dopachrome tautomerase, a human gene
