= Phenylpyruvic acid =

Names
- Preferred IUPAC name 2-Oxo-3-phenylpropanoic acid
- Other names: Phenylpyruvate; 3-Phenylpyruvic acid; Keto-phenylpyruvate; beta-Phenylpyruvic acid

Identifiers
CAS Number	156-06-9
3D model (JSmol)	Interactive image
ChEBI	CHEBI:30851
ChemSpider	972
ECHA InfoCard	100.005.317
PubChem CID	997
UNII	X7CO62M413
CompTox Dashboard (EPA)	DTXSID1042281
- InChI: InChI=1S/C9H8O3/c10-8(9(11)12)6-7-4-2-1-3-5-7/h1-5H,6H2,(H,11,12) Key: InChIKey=BTNMPGBKDVTSJY-UHFFFAOYSA-N
- SMILES: c1ccccc1CC(=O)C(=O)O

Properties
Chemical formula	C_{9}H_{8}O_{3}
Molar mass	164.160 g·mol^{−1}
Melting point	155 °C (311 °F; 428 K) (decomposes)
- Except where otherwise noted, data are given for materials in their standard state (at 25 °C [77 °F], 100 kPa). verify (what is ?) Infobox references

Phenylpyruvic acid is the organic compound with the formula C_{6}H_{5}CH_{2}C(O)CO_{2}H. It is a keto acid.

== Occurrence and properties ==
The compound exists in equilibrium with its (E)- and (Z)-enol tautomers. It is a product from the oxidative deamination of phenylalanine.

When the activity of the enzyme phenylalanine hydroxylase is reduced, the amino acid phenylalanine accumulates and gets converted into phenylpyruvic acid (phenylpyruvate), which leads to 'Phenylketonuria (PKU)' instead of 'tyrosine' which is the normal product of phenylalanine hydroxylase.

== Preparation and reactions ==
It can be prepared by many methods. Classically it is produced from aminocinnamic acid derivatives. It has been prepared by condensation of benzaldehyde and glycine derivatives to give phenylazlactone, which is then hydrolyzed with acid- or base-catalysis. It can also be synthesized from benzyl chloride by double carbonylation.

Reductive amination of phenylpyruvic acid gives phenylalanine.

== See also ==
- Phenylpyruvate decarboxylase
- Phenylpyruvate tautomerase
- Phenylketonuria
