= Trump Gold Card =

Immigrant investor program offered by US

- Front side of the Trump Gold Card
- Type: Permanent resident card
- Issued by: US Citizenship and Immigration Services
- Purpose: Personal identification document
- Cost: $1,000,000–5,000,000

The Trump Gold Card is an immigrant investor program offered by the United States that grants investors automatic eligibility for non-immigrant or EB-1 or EB-2 immigrant visas, as well as a pathway for US lawful permanent resident status. The Trump Gold Card program was introduced by President Donald Trump in his second term to provide prospective investors a pathway to gain lawful permanent resident status, following a substantive lump sum donation to the US federal government, and paying the applicable processing fees to the United States Citizenship and Immigration Services (USCIS).

== History ==
In February 2025, US president Donald Trump announced his intention to establish a new immigration category, aimed at high net-worth foreign investors. Trump corresponded with Secretary of Commerce, Howard Lutnick, regarding the details of the program, and the possibility that the fees generated from the Trump Gold Card program can be utilized to pay off the national debt of the United States. This new immigrant category would be established to replace the existing EB-5 immigrant category, which requires prospective applicants to finance and invest substantially to a US-based business, and demonstrate that a minimum of ten jobs were created in the process.

On June 12, 2025, Trump posted on Truth Social that "more than fifteen thousand have signed up and joined the Waiting List." By June 16, Commerce Secretary Howard Lutnick announced that almost 70,000 people had joined the waitlist.

On September 19, 2025, Trump signed Executive Order 14351, officially permitting the program to be established.

On April 23, 2026, Commerce Secretary Howard Lutnick testified that only one person had been approved for the card. This was assumed to be Nicki Minaj who received a card free of charge from the president earlier in the year.

As of May 2026, 338 individuals have applied for a Gold Card and 165 people have paid the $15,000 visa processing fee, according to the Department of Homeland Security.

== Eligibility ==
All applicants to the Trump Gold Card program are vetted by the US Department of Homeland Security. Applicants must be currently admissible to the United States, and demonstrate that they have not committed a crime of moral turpitude.

=== Trump Gold Card ===
The Trump Gold Card allows prospective investors automatic eligibility for EB-1 or EB-2 immigrant visas and pathway for US lawful permanent resident status, following a US$1 million donation to the US federal government.

=== Trump Corporate Gold Card ===
The Trump Corporate Gold Card permits employers to sponsor one or more employees, following a US$2 million donation to the US federal government. It allows employers to sponsor more employees without having to provide another donation.

=== Platinum Card ===
The prospective Trump Platinum Card permits investors a visitor visa that allows them to visit the United States for up to 270 days per year without being liable to the Substantial Presence Test, and therefore not being liable for federal income tax on income earned outside the US Applicants must submit a US$5 million donation.

The September 2025 executive order did not mention the Platinum Card. There are constitutional questions about the executive authority for this kind of change to immigration and tax law without express approval from the US Congress. It is unclear what would happen to the US federal taxability of a Platinum Card holder's non-US income if the holder becomes a US citizen.

== Criticism ==
Policy experts have argued that similar programs have been attempted in other countries, such as Spain, Malta, and the United Kingdom, but have been ended due to concerns on increased housing costs, issues of national security, and money laundering.

== See also ==
- Branding of United States government programs and facilities after Donald Trump
