= EB-3 visa =

American visa preference category

EB-3 is a visa preference category for United States employment-based permanent residency. It is intended for "skilled workers", "professionals", and "other workers". Those are prospective immigrants who don't qualify for the EB-1 or EB-2 preferences. The EB-3 requirements are less stringent, but the backlog may be longer. Unlike persons with extraordinary abilities in the EB-1 category, EB-3 applicants require a sponsoring employer. There is no "self-petition" category.

== Eligibility criteria ==
The EB-3 category has three subcategories: EB-3A, Professionals; EB-3B, Skilled Workers; and EB-3C, Other Workers. For each, eligibility requirements include:

- a Permanent Labor Certification
- a permanent, full-time job offer
- ability to demonstrate that the applicant will be performing work for which qualified workers are not available in the United States.

Separate requirements for each category are:

- Skilled workers - must be able to demonstrate at least 2 years of job experience or training
- Professionals - must possess a U.S. baccalaureate degree or foreign degree equivalent, and must demonstrate that a baccalaureate degree is the normal requirement for entry into the occupation. Education and experience may not be substituted for a baccalaureate degree.
- Other workers - must be capable, at the time the petition is filed by the sponsoring employer, of performing unskilled labor (requiring less than 2 years training or experience), that is not of a temporary or seasonal nature, for which qualified workers are not available in the United States.

== Quotas ==
As of September 2012, the Department of State determined that the FY-2012 numerical limit for the worldwide employment-based preference must be 144,951, and the per-country limit must be 7% of the worldwide cap, regardless of the population of the country (this explains the enormous backlog for India and China). Out of this, the EB-3 category is limited to 28.6% of the worldwide level, plus any numbers not used by EB-1 and EB-2 ("spillover"), and with not more than 10,000 for "other workers".

== Application ==
The application process begins with obtaining a Permanent Labor Certification, by submitting ETA Form 9089. The applicant does not need to be employed when the labor certification is filed; a future job offer is sufficient. The labor certification will accompany the actual application, the Petition for Alien Worker (Form I-140), which will confirm the applicant's states under E34, E35, EW4 or EW5 visas. During the lengthy application process, many persons in the EB-3 category acquire additional experience or education, and are eligible apply for an "upgrade" to EB-2.

As of February 2016, the Department of State application processing fee for employment-based immigrant visas is US$345. The fee for the USCIS Immigrant Petition for Alien Worker (form I-140) is US$700. Other costs include medical examination and, if applicable, required vaccinations; translations; fees for obtaining supporting documents such as passport, police certificates, birth certificates, etc.

== See also ==
- Permanent residence (United States) (the "green card")
