= Visagate =

Visagate is a news headline term that has been used to refer to the following incidents:

- A change in the US State Department's Visa Bulletin that affected mainly Indian and Chinese green card applicants (2015)
- The application of the visa policy of the United Kingdom during the Ukrainian refugee crisis (2022)
