= U.S. Committee for Refugees and Immigrants =

American nonprofit organization

- Formation: 1911; 115 years ago
- Type: Non-Profit Organization
- Headquarters: Arlington, Virginia
- President and CEO: Eskinder Negash
- Website: refugees.org

The U.S. Committee for Refugees and Immigrants (USCRI) is a 501(c)(3) nonprofit organization with locations in the United States, Mexico, El Salvador, Honduras, and Kenya, and a national network of nearly 200 partner agencies that provide support for those experiencing forced and voluntary displacement.

For over a hundred years, the U.S. Committee for Refugee and Immigrants (USCRI) has fought for a future where "migrants, refugees, and uprooted people will live dignified lives with their rights respected and protected in communities of opportunity."

Its work currently focuses on refugee resettlement, home study and post-release services for unaccompanied children, anti-trafficking, refugee health, immigration legal services, and policy and advocacy.

The current president and CEO is Eskinder Negash, who previously served as the director of the Office of Refugee Resettlement (ORR) from 2009 to 2015.

== History ==
USCRI traces its history back to 1911 with the founding of the early International Institutes and Travelers' Aid societies.

The early 1900s was a time of incredible growth for the immigrant population of the United States, by 1910, three-quarters of New York City's population was either an immigrant or a first generation American. This increase in the immigrant population, as well as increased diversity of new arrivals, led to a re-thinking of the prevailing melting pot ideal, which emphasized the assimilation of new arrivals into mainstream American culture. This understanding led to a narrow definition of American culture that did not allow for cultural, racial, linguistic, or religious diversity.

In opposition to the melting pot, there was a rise in cultural pluralism, the ideas that the U.S. is stronger because of the contributions of immigrants and the acceptance of cultural diversity. While there is still much to be done to realize this vision, the 1910s saw these sentiments growing in ways they had not previously.

This line of thinking led to the foundation of the International Institute Movement in 1910 under the sponsorship of the Young Women's Christian Association (YWCA). The first International Institute was opened that year in New York City by social worker Edith Terry Bremer. This institute provided social and legal services to immigrant girls and women and laid the foundation of what was to become the U.S. Committee for Refugees and Immigrants (USCRI), providing immigrants and refugees many of the same services USCRI and its partner affiliates offer today—employment assistance, social services, and information about immigration law.

In the 1920s, the International Institute movement grew to 55 institutes nationally, concentrated in industrialized cities with large populations of immigrants. These agencies celebrated ethnic diversity and encouraged New Americans to maintain their languages and cultures while participating in all aspects of American life.

Unfortunately, attitudes towards immigrants took a turn in the 1920s with a rise in xenophobia.

In 1921, The International Institute of New York was succeeded by the Foreign Language Information Service (FLIS) as part of the movement to counter these anti-immigrant attitudes by providing immigrants information about American life and those born in the U.S. information about New Americans. In the following year, FLIS began publishing Interpreter Releases, a weekly newsletter containing news and analysis of immigration legislation, regulations, legal opinions, cases, and agency memoranda. FLIS also published The Bulletin, which spread information about the naturalization process, immigration law, income tax regulations, employment opportunities, education, health and child welfare. This publication was succeeded by the Visa Bulletin, now published on the U.S. Department of State's website. In 1934, FLIS welcomed journalist Louis Adamic, an immigrant from Slovenia, to its board. In 1934, Adamic secured funding from the Carnegie Corporation, changed FLIS' name to the Common Council for American Unity (CCAU), and launched a new publication, Common Ground. This journal published fiction and non-fiction works stressing cultural pluralism and ethnic harmony and included works by Langston Hughes.

In 1959, the CCAU merged with the American Federation of International Institutes to form the American Council for Nationalities Services (ACNS). In that same year, the U.S. Committee for Refugees (USCR) was formed.

In 1979, ACNS joined with the U.S. Committee for Refugees (USCR) to publish the World Refugee Survey, an annual publication that provided a comprehensive review of global trends related to refugees and feature articles on national and global issues, specific countries, global aggregate and country statistics, and analyses of root causes and potential solutions. The World Refugee Survey also included a country ranking based on an analysis of compliance under the 1951 Convention Relating to the Status of Refugees. Countries were graded on: 1) Refoulement/Physical Protection; 2) Freedom of Movement and Residence; 3) Detention/Access to Courts; 4) Right to Earn a Livelihood; and 5) Public Relief and Education. This survey continued until 2008.

ACNS later became the Immigration and Refugee Services of America in 1994, and in 2004 changed its name to the U.S. Committee for Refugees and Immigrants (USCRI).

USCRI has acted under this name since 2004 and has continued to expand its programing, opening offices throughout the United States, as well as El Salvador, Honduras, México, and Kenya.

== Programs and services ==
USCRI works in all 50 U.S. states, México, El Salvador, Honduras, and Kenya to provide support for those experiencing forced and voluntary displacement, including unaccompanied children and adult and minor survivors of trafficking.

USCRI's programs include legal, refugee health, anti-trafficking, and children's services, as well as policy and advocacy.

Its international programs focus on supporting youth migrants and returnees.

Refugee Resettlement.

USCRI provides resettlement services in Albany, New York, Cleveland, Ohio, Colchester, Vermont, Des Moines, Iowa, Dearborn, Michigan, Erie, Pennsylvania, and Raleigh, North Carolina. The goal of USCRI's refugee programs is to help refugees and other newcomers achieve self-sufficiency and become contributing members of their new communities.

USCRI is one of non-profit organizations working with the U.S. Department of State Bureau of Population, Refugees and Migration to provide reception upon arrival. This includes support acquiring housing, food, and clothing, community orientations, English lessons, employment counseling and job placement, enrollment in various benefits program, and referrals to social service providers.

Working with the U.S. Department of Health and Human Services, Office of Refugee Resettlement, USCRI provides newcomers with job training, job placement, one-on-one case management, a short-term cash allowance, and additional employment services—including English classes, driving lessons, and lessons on culture in the American workplace.

As of 2023 USCRI has resettled over 350,00 refugees from across the world.

Children's Services

Since 2004, USCRI has been providing vital social services to unaccompanied migrant children (UC), who have fled violence, abuse, and/or persecution in their home country and arrived in the United States without parents or immigration status. These children face challenges no child should ever have to face and often experience trauma in their country of origin, on the journey to the United States, and once in the United States.

USCRI provides shelter, legal, mental health services, and case management to recently arrived Unaccompanied Children. Once in the United States, UC are often placed in federal custody until they can be united with a family member or sponsor. USCRI has a temporary home for girls who have arrived in the United States unaccompanied and provides home studies to ensure that these children are released to safe environments and that sponsors are prepared to meet their needs. USCRI also provides post release services to ensure the child's safety and successful integration into the community. This includes assisting with school enrollment and connecting families and sponsors with legal, medical, mental health services and other community resources.

In January 2019 USCRI opened its residential care facility, Rinconcito del Sol, "a little corner of sunshine," to provide a safe temporary home for girls, the majority of whom have crossed the border from countries in the Northern Triangle in Central America. At the shelter, the girls attend school, receive medical and mental health care, and participate in therapeutic activities, such as gardening, swimming, art, music lessons, and equine and canine therapy.

USCRI and its partners provide services to more than 25,000 children and their sponsors throughout the U.S. each year.

Anti-Trafficking Services

Human trafficking—in both commercial sex and forced labor—is a significant and growing problem in the U.S. and worldwide.

According to the International Labour Organization, there were 27.6 million people in forced labor on any given day in 2021, an increase from 24.9 million in 2016. An estimated 6.3 million individuals were in situations of forced commercial sex, with children accounting for more than a quarter of these cases.

Since 2012, USCRI has worked with foreign national survivors of trafficking through the U.S. Department of Health and Human Services' Trafficking Victim Assistance Program (TVAP). TVAP participants are provided with comprehensive case management services, including ensuring they have housing, food, and clothing, health care, mental health services, legal services, and employment assistance to help them stabilize and live independently. As of 2019, USCRI has served over 4,200 foreign national survivors of human trafficking through TVAP.

In 2022, this program expanded to include the Aspire: Child Trafficking Victims Assistance Program, which provides comprehensive case management services to foreign national minor survivors of trafficking. This split was motivated by a desire to provide age-appropriate comprehensive care to minor survivors, including unaccompanied children.

Refugee Health Services.

Due to experiences in their home country, on their journey, and after arriving in the U.S., refugees are at increased risk of certain medical and mental health conditions. Prior to arriving in the U.S., they may have experienced nutritional deprivation, water contamination, inadequate living conditions, a lack of access to basic medical and dental care, as well as trauma, loss, and persecution.

USCRI helps refugees and other individuals lay a solid foundation for a healthy start in the U.S. through the Refugee Medical Assistance and Refugee Medical Screening Programs. All refugees receive a health screening before arriving in the United States. USCRI's Refugee Health Services program provides newly arrived refugees with health insurance coverage for up to one year after arrival. USCRI operates this program in Kansas, Maine, Missouri, Tennessee, and Texas.

Following guidelines from the Department of Health and Human Services, USCRI makes sure that all refugees are referred to a primary care provider, understand how to access medical care in the U.S., are screened for medical and mental health issues, and are seeking necessary medical care. USCRI takes a holistic approach which includes initial medical screening and surveillance, ongoing health care, health education, and partnerships and outreach in the community.

In the wake of the Taliban takeover of Afghanistan in 2021, many resettled Afghans struggle with stress, acculturation, trauma, loss, and grief. To help support these new arrivals, USCRI established the Behavioral Health Support Program, with funding from the Office of Refugee Resettlement. The program is led by qualified professionals from the Afghan diaspora, in partnership with The Afghan Medical Professionals Association of America (AMPAA) and offers culturally and linguistically tailored and trauma-informed mental health and psychosocial care and crisis support through telehealth services, field teams, and a 24/7 hotline.

International Programs

As of 2024, USCRI operates seven offices across El Salvador, Honduras, Mexico, and Kenya. These offices provide educational, vocational, and legal support for refugees, asylum seekers, returnees, and other populations experiencing displacement to support their transition to a dignified life.

El Salvador

USCRI's office in El Salvador, opened in 2015, supports youth returnees through the Livelihoods Programs. This program provides vocational training, job opportunities, employer engagement, and microenterprise development, leading to new opportunities for Salvadoran youth and their families while strengthening the economic development of the country. The program offers alternatives to repeat migration by providing hope and opportunity to those who see no other pathway to a better life.

Honduras

Similarly, USCRI operates the Livelihoods program at its office in Honduras, providing training and employment opportunities to youth returnees and giving them the tools to re-establish their lives in their home country.

Mexico

In Mexico, USCRI operates the Habesha Project, which provides scholarships, complementary pathways, and educational and migration support for refugees from across the world. In 2024, USCRI Mexico welcomed four refugee students from Kakuma Refugee Camp in Kenya to being their higher education studies in Mexico.

USCRI's Tijuana office also provides "Know Your Rights" presentations and legal assistance for those seeking safety in the United States and Mexico.

Kenya

In 2024, USCRI opened an office in Nairobi, Kenya to provides social services to improve the health and education of young refugees, as well as advocate for stronger refugee protections and policies, including durable solutions to refugee warehousing. For over five decades, USCRI has advocated on behalf of refugees warehoused in camps indefinitely, particularly in East Africa. Kenya is home to some of the largest and oldest refugee camps in the world- generations have been born and had children of their own in these camps.

Keep Girls Dreaming

In 2023, following a field visit to Dadaab and Kakuma refugee camps and Kalobeyei Settlement in Kenya, USCRI established the Keep Girls Dreaming Initiative to provide menstrual hygiene supplies to refugees in these camps. In just a few months, Keep Girls Dreaming raised enough funds to purchase, deliver, and distribute over half a million sanitary pads to Dadaab, Kakuma, and Kalobeyei. This initiative is in collaboration with Chandaria Industries, a local Kenyan manufacturer for hygiene products made from recyclable materials.

Immigration Legal Services.

Since 2010, USCRI has offered free or low-cost professional legal representation to low-income refugees and immigrants with humanitarian and family-based immigration matters. Legal assistance includes asylum petitions, family reunification claims, and classes and processing support for naturalization and citizenship requests. USCRI also provides direct legal representation for unaccompanied children who arrive in the U.S. without parents or resources and to survivors of trafficking.

Following the evacuation of Afghanistan in August 2021, USCRI, with funding from the Office of Refugee Resettlement, operates the Immigrant Legal Services for Afghan Arrivals (ILSAA) program, which provides Eligible Afghan Arrivals (EAAs) across the country with free legal services to help them navigate the U.S. legal immigration system, this includes support for family reunification and adjustment of status. ILSAA also provides trainings to build the capacity of Legal Service Providers (LSPs) and participates in Afghan Support Centers (ASCs) across the country.

Policy and Advocacy

USCRI's Policy and Advocacy Team leads the development of the organization's position on legislation, U.S. and international policies, and the root causes and conditions of crisis, movement, and resettlement for refugees and other displaced populations. The team conducts research, writes in-depth, topic-specific issue papers, drafts comments on government regulations, conducts briefings, communicates with the U.S. Government and international organizations, analyzes legal decisions and international instruments, and serves as experts on refugee and immigration issues, concepts, and trends.

While USCRI no longer publishes the World Refugee Survey, the Policy and Advocacy Team continues to provide updates on country conditions, national and global issues, and analyses of root causes and potential solutions through bi-weekly reports on pressing issues and larger reports based on field research.

== World Refugee Survey ==
The World Refugee Survey is an annual USCRI report presenting information on refugees, internally displaced persons and asylum seekers. The country-by-country analysis is based on information collected from governments, international organizations, nongovernmental organizations and field visits. Each country profiled in the Survey is given a grade. Countries are rated according to refugees' enjoyment of rights under the 1951 Convention Relating to the Status of Refugees and are graded on: 1) Refoulement/Physical Protection 2) Freedom of Movement and Residence 3) Detention/Access to Courts 4) Right to Earn a Livelihood and 5) Public Relief and Education.

On June 19, 2008, the U.S. Committee for Refugees and Immigrants and its research partners released the World Refugee Survey 2008 with events around the world. Within the annual publication, USCRI released a list of the Ten Worst Places for Refugees. Countries and regions were graded based on their commitment to standards outlined in the 1951 Convention Relating to the Status of Refugees. As determined by the committee, the 'Ten Worst Places' were: Bangladesh, China, Europe, Iraq, Kenya, Malaysia, Russia, Sudan, and Thailand. Sixty countries hosting the largest numbers of refugees were profiled in the 2008 survey. In 2009, the 'Worst Places for Refugees' were South Africa, Gaza, Thailand, Kenya, Malaysia, Egypt and Turkey.

On June 20, 2008, Deputy Prime Minister Datuk Seri Najib Tun Razak of Malaysia stated, "Malaysia strongly disagrees with the newly released World Refugee Survey 2008."
