= NIW =

NIW may refer to:

- National Interest Waiver, for EB-2 visas in the United States
- Nieuw Israëlietisch Weekblad, a Jewish newspaper in the Netherlands
- Nimo language, Papua New Guinea (ISO 639-3 code: niw)
- Normal-inverse-Wishart distribution, a probability distribution
- Northern Ireland Water, the main water company for Northern Ireland
