= Priority date =

United States immigration concept

Priority date is a United States immigration concept – it is the date when a principal applicant first reveals his or her intent of immigration to the US government. For family-sponsored applicants, the priority date is the date an immigration petition, filed on behalf of him or her, is received by the United States Citizenship and Immigration Services (USCIS). For employment-based immigration beneficiaries, the priority date is the date an immigration petition is filed at USCIS, under categories where a labor certification is not required, or when the United States Department of Labor receives a labor certification application, under categories where a labor certification is required. In all cases, the priority dates are not established until USCIS approves the immigration petition. The date establishes one's place in the queue for a family-sponsored or employment-based or permanent residency permit (also known as "green card") application.

The United States Department of State publishes a monthly Visa Bulletin which lists cut-off dates for different immigration categories and countries of birth. Only those intending applicants with priority dates before the cut-off date are permitted to file their Adjustment of Status (AOS) applications or attend immigrant visa interviews at consulates. The cut-off dates generally move forward over time as old cases are approved or abandoned. However, in certain cases, such as if a large number of old cases work their way through the system at about the same time, the cut-off dates can actually retrogress (or roll back). If an individual already has a pending AOS application on file when a retrogression occurs that places the cut-off earlier than the applicant's priority date, USCIS sets the application aside and will not adjudicate it until the priority date is current again. As an example, after months of stagnation, in June 2007 the priority date cut-offs for employment-based second and third-preference (EB2 and EB3) applicants (the bulk of employment-based green card applicants) advanced dramatically for all countries of birth. On the low end, the cut-off advanced eight months for immigrants from mainland China for EB2 category. EB3 for India-born applicants has moved forward 25 months, the most of any category, thus impacting a huge number of workers with jobs requiring bachelor's degrees.

For individuals starting the employment-based green card process now, country of chargeability and job requirements are paramount in determining how long the overall process will take. Individuals from countries of chargeability other than China or India with jobs requiring a master's degree can complete the entire process, from labor certification to receiving the green card, within approximately one to two years from start to finish, if there is no backlog of visa availability, i.e., all priority dates are current. Workers whose immigrant visas are chargeable to China or India with jobs requiring only a bachelor's degree can expect to wait several years after their employer files the labor certification and immigrant visa petition to become eligible to file the final application for the green card itself.
