= Targeted Employment Area =

Designated investment region of the United States

A Targeted Employment Area (TEA) is a region of the United States for which the threshold for investment for an investor to be eligible for the EB-5 visa is $500,000 or $900,000 (as opposed to the usual $1,800,000 threshold for the US as a whole), with a judge striking down the increase of the amount from $500,000 to $900,000 but USCIS website continuing to state it as $900,000. There are two kinds of TEAs: high unemployment areas (defined as areas having unemployment more than 150% the national average calculated by the Bureau of Labor Statistics) and rural areas (defined as areas outside a Metropolitan Statistical Area).

== Definition ==
There are two kinds of TEAs recognized by the USCIS: rural areas and high unemployment areas.

=== Rural areas ===
An area can be designated as a TEA if, at the time of application, it is a rural area. This is defined as an area that is not within either a metropolitan statistical area (MSA) (as designated by the Office of Management and Budget) or the outer boundary of any city or town having a population of 20,000 or more.

=== High unemployment areas ===
An area can be designated as a TEA based on high unemployment if it has experienced unemployment of at least 150% of the national average rate as determined by the Bureau of Labor Statistics. In 2018, this average was 3.9%, so currently, to qualify as a TEA based on high unemployment an area must have an unemployment rate of at least 5.9% (3.9 * 150%).

=== TEA determination ===
If the location of the proposed new business is not already determined to be a TEA, the investor has the option to gather the relevant publicly available state or federal statistics on their own and submit it with their petition for USCIS to have a new TEA determination made.

There is no centralized list of targeted employment areas, but state agencies in various states maintain their own lists or criteria for identifying TEAs, as well as information on local unemployment rates that can be cited in applications. Various US states facilitate the process by allowing people to apply for certification for particular areas being designated as TEAs. USCIS defers to state determinations but periodically reviews the criteria used by states to confirm that they comply with its guidelines.

In addition, there are privately collected information sources on unemployment by census tract, including interactive maps, that can help investors identify TEAs.

== TEA designations in various states ==
=== Hawaii ===
According to Hawaii's official website, the following parts of the state are TEAs:

- The Island of Hawaiʻi
- The Island of Kauaʻi
- Some areas of the Island of Oʻahu (however, the island is a metropolitan area and does not qualify in its entirety)
- Small parts of the Islands of Maui, Molokaʻi, and Lānaʻi (however, these islands are metropolitan statistical areas so most parts of these islands are ineligible).

=== California ===
In California, the investor may petition the state government for designating a particular subdivision of the area as an area of high unemployment (over 150% the national average). The California Department of Housing and Community Development provides a list of street ranges and census tracts for TEAs.

=== Florida ===
The state of Florida maintains a list of Targeted Employment Areas, of which there are currently 33.

Rural areas included are Bradford County, Calhoun County, Citrus County, Columbia County, DeSoto County, Dixie County, Franklin County, Glades County, Gulf County, Hamilton County, Hardee County, Hendry County, Jackson County, Lafayette County, Levy County, Liberty County, Madison County, Monroe County (excluding Key West), Okeechobee County, Putnam County, Sumter County, Suwannee County, Taylor County, Union County, Walton County, and Washington County.

The list of non-rural high-unemployment areas is subject to regular change based on fluctuations in unemployment rate. The list in August 2012 included Palm Coast metropolitan statistical area (Flagler County), Hernando County, City of Hialeah (in Miami-Dade County), City of Miami Gardens (in Miami-Dade County), and City of Fort Pierce (in St. Lucie County).

=== Texas ===
The city of Austin in Texas listed 31 designated TEAs and also provided an unemployment cutoff of 11.1% (150% of the national unemployment rate of 7.4%, as determined by the Bureau of Labor Statistics) for non-rural areas to qualify as TEAs.

=== Washington ===
Washington, the US state, maintains its own list of TEAs.

=== Minnesota ===
The state of Minnesota commissioned a study by the Carlson Consulting Enterprise to better understand how the state could leverage the EB-5 investor program to drive employment growth in the state, particularly in high-unemployment areas. The program has also been highlighted as a way to improve employment for black residents on North Minneapolis (a designated TEA) by matching them with EB-5 investors from Asia.

== Reception ==
A 2011 article in the New York Times claimed that areas within New York had been strangely gerrymandered so that relatively upscale and wealthy locations could qualify for TEA status, and also noted pushback from locals against an EB-5-funded program for a proposed China City program in upstate New York. Similarly, EB-5-funded construction projects by Marriott, including some in Washington D.C., have met with criticism for how they have sought TEA status for wealthy and well-off regions, contradicting the original spirit of the TEA designation.

The Washington City Paper cited the American Immigration Lawyers Association on the ease of having your area designated as a TEA, writing: "The ease of qualifying for TEAs is such an open secret that the American Immigration Lawyers Association fact sheet on EB-5 states simply, "Each immigrant investor must create 10 US jobs with an investment of $500,000 or more"—rather than the $1 million required outside of TEAs."

Similar skepticism about TEAs was expressed in an article in Fortune, that said: "One essential part of gaining USCIS approval was crafting an acceptable "targeted employment area," or TEA. The EB-5 law requires investment in a district that is either rural or has a jobless rate that is 150% of the national average. But after years of industry pressure, it's now USCIS policy to automatically accept any state designation of a TEA, even though states routinely approve gerrymandered districts that tack on distant high-unemployment tracts to allow EB-5 endeavors in wealthy areas."
