= Seal of the United States Department of Homeland Security =

Symbol of the United States Department of Homeland Security

Seal of the U.S. Department of Homeland Security
- The seal of the United States Department of Homeland Security
- Armiger: United States Department of Homeland Security
- Adopted: June 19, 2003
- Torse: U.S. DEPARTMENT OF HOMELAND SECURITY
- Other elements: A graphically styled American eagle appears in a circular blue field. The eagle's outstretched wings break through an inner red ring into an outer white ring that contains a circular placement of the words "U.S. DEPARTMENT OF" in the top half and "HOMELAND SECURITY" in the bottom half. The outer white ring has a silvery gray border. As in The Great Seal, the eagle's left claw holds an olive branch with 13 leaves and 13 seeds (olives) while the right claw grasps 13 arrows. Centered on the eagle's breast is a shield divided into three sections containing elements that represent the homeland "from sea to shining sea." The top element, a dark blue sky, contains 22 stars representing the original 22 agencies and bureaus that have come together to form the department. The left shield element contains white mountains behind a green plain underneath a light blue sky. The right shield element contains four wave shapes representing the oceans, lakes and waterways alternating light and dark blue separated by white lines.
- Earlier version
- Use: To represent the organization and denote official documents, objects, vessels, aircraft, vehicles, and officers.

The Seal of the U.S. Department of Homeland Security is the symbol of the United States Department of Homeland Security (DHS) and is used to represent the organization and authenticate certain official documents.

The seal was developed with input from senior DHS leadership, employees, and the U.S. Commission on Fine Arts. The Ad Council, which partners with DHS on its Ready.gov campaign, and the consulting company Landor Associates were responsible for graphic design and maintaining heraldic integrity. The seal is also featured on the DHS flag, which consists of the seal itself emblazoned on a blue background.

== History ==
The flag of the U.S. Office of Homeland Security, the predecessor to the U.S. Department of Homeland Security

The flag of the U.S. Department of Homeland Security, featuring the DHS seal on a blue background of Pantone #2955C

The U.S. Department of Homeland Security was formed in November 2002, succeeding the U.S. Office of Homeland Security (OHS), which was created in October 2001 in response to the September 11 attacks. Whereas the OHS was a subsidiary office of the Executive Office of the President (EOP), the DHS is an independent, cabinet-level department.

From the creation of the agency in late 2002 until the adoption of a dedicated departmental seal in 2003, the DHS utilized a slightly-modified version of the U.S. great seal.

The seal was developed with input from senior DHS leadership, employees, and the U.S. Commission on Fine Arts. The Ad Council, which partners with DHS on its Ready.gov campaign, and the consulting company Landor Associates were responsible for graphic design and maintaining heraldic integrity. The seal is also featured on the DHS flag, which consists of the seal itself emblazoned on a blue background.

The colors of the seal are specified as "Homeland Security Blue", specified as 2955 C on the Pantone Matching System, "Homeland Security Gray", specified as Cool Gray 6 C on the Pantone Matching System, "Homeland Security Red", specified as 187 C on the Pantone Matching System, "Homeland Security Light Blue", specified as 307 C on the Pantone Matching System, and "Homeland Security Green", specified as 370 C on the Pantone Matching System.

In June 2003, several months after the DHS was created, the DHS seal was unveiled. A DHS press release dated June 19, 2003 describes the seal as follows:

The seal is symbolic of the Department's mission – to prevent attacks and protect Americans – on the land, in the sea and in the air. In the center of the seal, a graphically styled white American eagle appears in a circular blue field. The eagle's outstretched wings break through an inner red ring into an outer white ring that contains the words "U.S. DEPARTMENT OF" in the top half and "HOMELAND SECURITY" in the bottom half in a circular placement.

The eagle's wings break through the inner circle into the outer ring to suggest that the Department of Homeland Security will break through traditional bureaucracy and perform government functions differently. In the tradition of the Great Seal of the United States, the eagle's talon on the left holds an olive branch with 13 leaves and 13 seeds while the eagle's talon on the right grasps 13 arrows.

Centered on the eagle's breast is a shield divided into three sections containing elements that represent the American homeland – air, land, and sea. The top element, a dark blue sky, contains 22 stars representing the original 22 entities that have come together to form the department. The left shield element contains white mountains behind a green plain underneath a light blue sky. The right shield element contains four wave shapes representing the oceans alternating light and dark blue separated by white lines.

The seal is prominently featured on the organizational flag of the U.S. Department of Homeland Security, which consists of the seal on a rectangular blue background of Pantone #2955C. In September 2026, the Department announced changes to the seal, with the eagle facing the arrows displayed on the seal, rather than the olive branch. Secretary Markwayne Mullin stated this change would be made because the Department is "at war every single day."
