= Visa Bulletin =

Publication regarding immigration to the United States

Visa Bulletin is a publication regarding immigration to the United States published by the United States Department of State. The primary purpose of this bulletin is to provide an updated waiting list (also known as Priority date) for immigrants who are subject to the quota system. The content of the bulletin is available on the web.

Immigrants to the United States are categorized under those that need a waiting list, such as those seeking admission as a relative of a permanent resident, and those who do not require placement on a waiting list, such as the husband or wife of a US citizen. For those visas that require a waiting list, a certain number of visas become available on annual basis. For example, there are about 23,000 visas available for married sons and daughters of US citizens; if the number of applicants in a year is over the available visa numbers, those applicants are placed in a queue and are given a priority date, which basically estimates when an applicant would get a visa based on the number of previous applicants in the queue.

The United States Department of State, Visa Control and Reporting Division is responsible for determining the movement of immigrant visa cut-off dates each month and for releasing the monthly Visa Bulletin. The Visa Bulletin is a monthly publication that provides updated monthly numbers of the list of applicants and the "current" priority date for those applicants. The publication normally is issued the second or third week of each month.

Visa Bulletin follows a standard format to sort the priority dates of the applicants and is broken down to the following visa categories:

1. Preference Allocation for Family-sponsored immigrants (INA Section 203(a))
2. Preference Allocation for Employment-based immigrants (INA Section 203(b))
3. Diversity immigrants (INA Section 203(c))

For the preference visa categories, tables for family-sponsored and employment-based visa number availability are published in each Visa Bulletin release. In the tables, "C" means current, i.e., visa numbers are available for all qualified applicants; and "U" means unavailable, i.e., no visa numbers are available. Visa numbers are available only for applicants whose priority date is earlier than the cut-off date listed in the tables.
