= National Interest Waiver =

United States immigration waiver for foreigners of exceptional status

A National Interest Waiver is an exemption from the labor certification process and job offer requirement for advanced degree/exceptional ability workers applying for an EB-2 Visa for Immigration into the United States.

EB-2 petitioners can avoid the PERM Labor Certification process by presenting as a 'national interest waiver'. NIW (National Interest Waiver) requires the foreign national to 'self-petition' so that they can file the I-140 form on their own behalf without involving any labor certification or a sponsoring employer. Petitioners still need to satisfy all EB-2 eligibility requirements related to having either an advanced degree or its equivalent, or showing extraordinary ability.

The ability to pursue a green card through a National Interest Waiver is enabled by Section 203 (b)(2)(B)(i) of the Immigration and Nationality Act of 1990 and 8 CFR § 204.5. The guidelines as to how to qualify for such a Waiver are developed through USCIS guidance, currently based on a 2016 precedent decision of the USCIS Administrative Appeals Office called Matter of DHANASAR (see below). As with petitions seeking other types of immigration benefits, USCIS officers use the preponderance of evidence standard of proof, when evaluating whether evidence submitted by NIW applicants is sufficient to grant the Waiver.

== Processing time ==
The processing time for the I-140 NIW usually varies from 6–15 months for petitions filed under Regular Processing. This depends on the service center and the adjudicating officer assigned by the United States Citizenship and Immigration Services (USCIS) to each petition. As of January 2023, petitioners may, for an extra fee, request Premium Processing for I-140 NIW petitions, under which a decision to either approve, deny, issue a Request for Evidence, or issue a Notice of Intent to Deny is guaranteed to be made within 45 days.

== Physician national interest waiver (PNIW) ==
Physician national interest waiver is a specially designed category for physicians/doctors to work and conduct impactful research in the United States. It enables a clinical physician/doctor to adjust their status to a lawful permanent resident without actually demonstrating that eligible and qualified physicians are unavailable in the particular location. The physician can also apply for the green card even if their employer is unwilling to file the petition on their behalf through the national interest waiver. In the United States, there always remains a shortage of physicians who can provide healthcare services to the disadvantaged areas.

To apply for the PNIW category, eligible physicians must meet the set of requirements listed by USCIS.

According to the regulations of USCIS, a physician may apply for the PNIW by working as a clinician in areas with a shortage. The applicant need to work in one of the following areas to qualify:

- Health professional shortage areas (HPSA)
- Medically underserved area (MUA)
- Mental health professional shortage area (MHPSA)
- Veterans' Affairs (VA) facility

== Eligibility requirements: Matter of DHANASAR ==
Matter of DHANASAR is a precedent decision issued by the USCIS Administrative Appeals Office on December 27, 2016. This binding decision stems from a petitioner's appeal of a National Interest Waiver denial by a USCIS adjudicator at the agency's Texas Service Center. In overturning and reversing the original USCIS denial of the specific case (thereby approving the petition), the AAO established binding new guidelines for the adjudication of National Interest Waiver petitions. These requirements replaced previous guidelines stemming from the 1998 appeals case Matter of New York State Department of Transportation (known as NYSDOT in the immigration law community).

The three new requirements (known as "prongs") for approval of a National Interest Waiver petition are that: *(1)... the foreign national's proposed endeavor has both substantial merit and national importance; (2) that he or she is well positioned to advance the proposed endeavor; and (3) that, on balance, it would be beneficial to the United States to waive the job offer and labor certification requirements."

USCIS further explained the DHANASAR framework by issuing new guidance to its employees through the addition of language to its adjudicator's manual (officially known as its Policy Manual).

=== Prong 1: Substantial merit and national importance ===
The first prong, substantial merit and national importance, focuses on the specific endeavor that the foreign national proposes to undertake. The endeavor's merit may be demonstrated in a range of areas such as business, entrepreneurship, science, technology, health, culture or education. In determining whether the proposed endeavor has national importance, USCIS considers its potential prospective impact.

=== Prong 2: Well-positioned to advance the proposed endeavor ===
This prong shifts the focus from the proposed endeavor to the foreign national. To determine whether the applicant is well positioned to advance the proposed endeavor, USCIS considers factors including: the individual's education, skills, knowledge and record of success in related or similar efforts; a model or plan for future activities; any progress towards achieving the proposed endeavor; and the interest of potential customers, users, investors, or other relevant entities or individuals.

=== Prong 3: On balance it is in the U.S. interest to waive the labor certification requirements ===
The third prong requires the petitioner to demonstrate that, on balance, it would be beneficial to the United States to waive the requirements of a job offer and thus of a labor certification. As per its Policy Manual, USCIS may evaluate factors such as: whether, in light of the nature of the foreign national's qualifications or the proposed endeavor, it would be impractical either for the foreign national to secure a job offer or go through the labor certification process or whether even if there are other qualified U.S. workers available, the U.S. would still benefit from the foreign national's contributions. Another factor is whether the national interest in the foreign national's contributions is sufficiently urgent to warrant forgoing the labor certification process. One factor USCIS' guidance deems evidence of the U.S. "still benefiting" even if other qualified U.S. workers are available is whether the proposed endeavor can realistically create many U.S. jobs.

== Requests for evidence ==
As with all other types of applications for immigration benefits, USCIS can issue Requests for Evidence to the petitioner when adjudicating EB-2 I-140 National Interest Waiver petitions. When issuing RFEs, USCIS may question whether each or any of the individual three prongs are satisfied by the petitioner, in whole or in part. USCIS may also additionally question whether the general EB-2 requirements (such as degree and experience requirements) have been fulfilled. In some cases, USCIS can also solely question the fulfilment of EB-2 requirements but establish that the prongs have already been satisfied.

It is the petitioner's responsibility to satisfy the RFE by providing the evidence that is requested.

== Approval rates ==
The National Interest Waiver petition approval rate was approximately 80% for 2023, 90% for 2022, 86% for 2021, 85% for 2020, 90% for 2019 and 91% for 2018.

== Policy initiatives (2021-) ==
The Biden Administration has issued executive orders and changed USCIS guidance making National Interest Waivers easier to obtain for STEM degree holders. In addition, other STEM-related executive orders have been considered by legal analysts to enhance the approval chances of certain NIW applicants. One commentator, Karl Muth, writing in Global Policy Journal and espousing a pro-immigration viewpoint, considers the liberalization of NIW guidance for STEM degreeholders and entrepreneurs Joe Biden's "biggest policy victory".

=== Artificial intelligence executive order ===
An order was issued on the 30th of October 2023, titled "Safe, Secure, and Trustworthy Development and Use of Artificial Intelligence." to promote the development of AI technology. Though not explicitly invoking National Interest Waivers, some legal analysts consider applicants with an AI-related proposed endeavor to have better chances of receiving approvals by being able to make stronger arguments that they meet Prong 1 and Prong 3 of the requirements.

=== Guidance regarding STEM entrepreneurs ===
In response to the February 2, 2021 Executive Order 14012-Restoring Faith in Our Legal Immigration Systems and Strengthening Integration and Inclusion Efforts for New Americans, USCIS amended guidance in early 2022 enabling more favorable adjudication of NIW petitions by STEM entrepreneurs and degree holders.
