= Green card =

Lawful permanent residency in the United States

United States permanent resident card
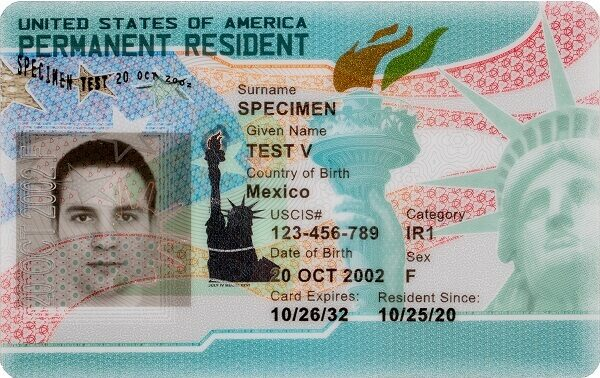

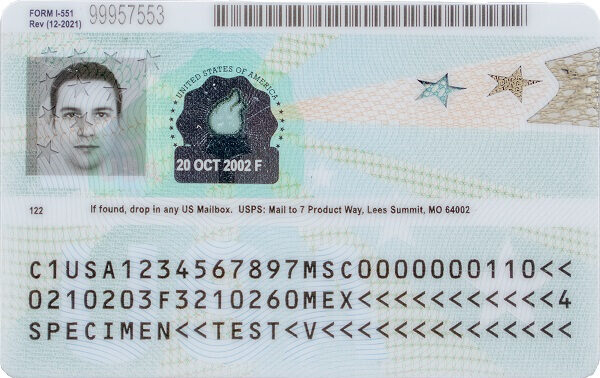
- Sample of a permanent resident card (often called a "green card") of the United States (2023)
- Type: Personal identification document
- Issued by: United States Citizenship and Immigration Services
- Purpose: Identification
- Expiration: 10 years (standard); 2 years (conditional)

A green card, known officially as a permanent resident card, is an identity document which shows that a person has permanent residency in the United States. Green card holders are formally known as lawful permanent residents (LPRs). As of 2024, there are an estimated 12.8 million green card holders, of whom almost 9 million are eligible to become United States citizens. Approximately 18,700 of them serve in the U.S. Armed Forces.

Green card holders are statutorily entitled to apply for U.S. citizenship after showing by a preponderance of the evidence that they, among other things, have continuously resided in the United States for one to five years and are persons of good moral character. Those who are younger than 18 years old automatically receive U.S. citizenship if they have at least one U.S. citizen parent.

The card is known as a "green card" because of its historical greenish color. It was formerly called a "certificate of alien registration", "Resident Alien Card" or an "alien registration receipt card". A holder of a green card must carry it with them at all times.

Green card applications are decided by the United States Citizenship and Immigration Services (USCIS), but in some cases an immigration judge or a member of the Board of Immigration Appeals (BIA), acting on behalf of the U.S. attorney general, may grant permanent residency in the course of removal proceedings. Any authorized federal judge may do the same by signing and issuing an injunction. Immigrant workers who would like to obtain a green card can apply using form I-140.

An LPR could become "removable" from the United States after suffering a criminal conviction, especially if it involved a particularly serious crime or an aggravated felony "for which the term of imprisonment was completed within the previous 15 years".

== History ==
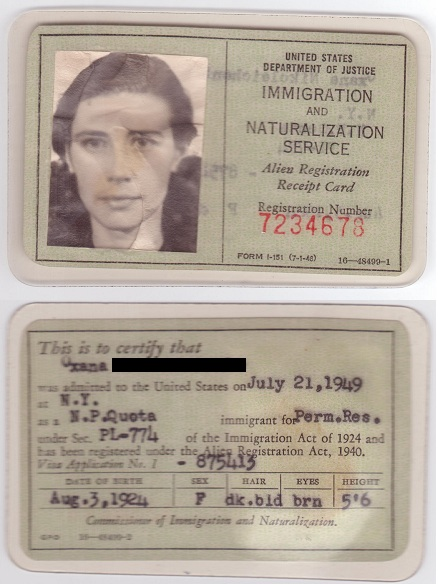
A 1949 "alien registration receipt card" of a female immigrant, which was issued by the now-abolished Immigration and Naturalization Service (INS) under the Nationality Act of 1940

The Immigration and Naturalization Service was formed as part of the Department of Labor in 1933, and in 1940 was moved under the Department of Justice along with the Nationality Act of 1940. During the 1940s the predecessor to the "Permanent Resident" card was the "Alien Registration Receipt Card" which on the back would indicate "Perm.Res" in accordance with the Immigration Act of 1924.

The INA, which was enacted by the U.S. Congress in 1952, states that "[t]he term 'alien' means any person, not a citizen or national of the United States."

=== Illegal Immigration Reform and Immigrant Responsibility Act ===
On September 30, 1996, President Clinton signed into law the Illegal Immigration Reform and Immigrant Responsibility Act (IIRIRA).

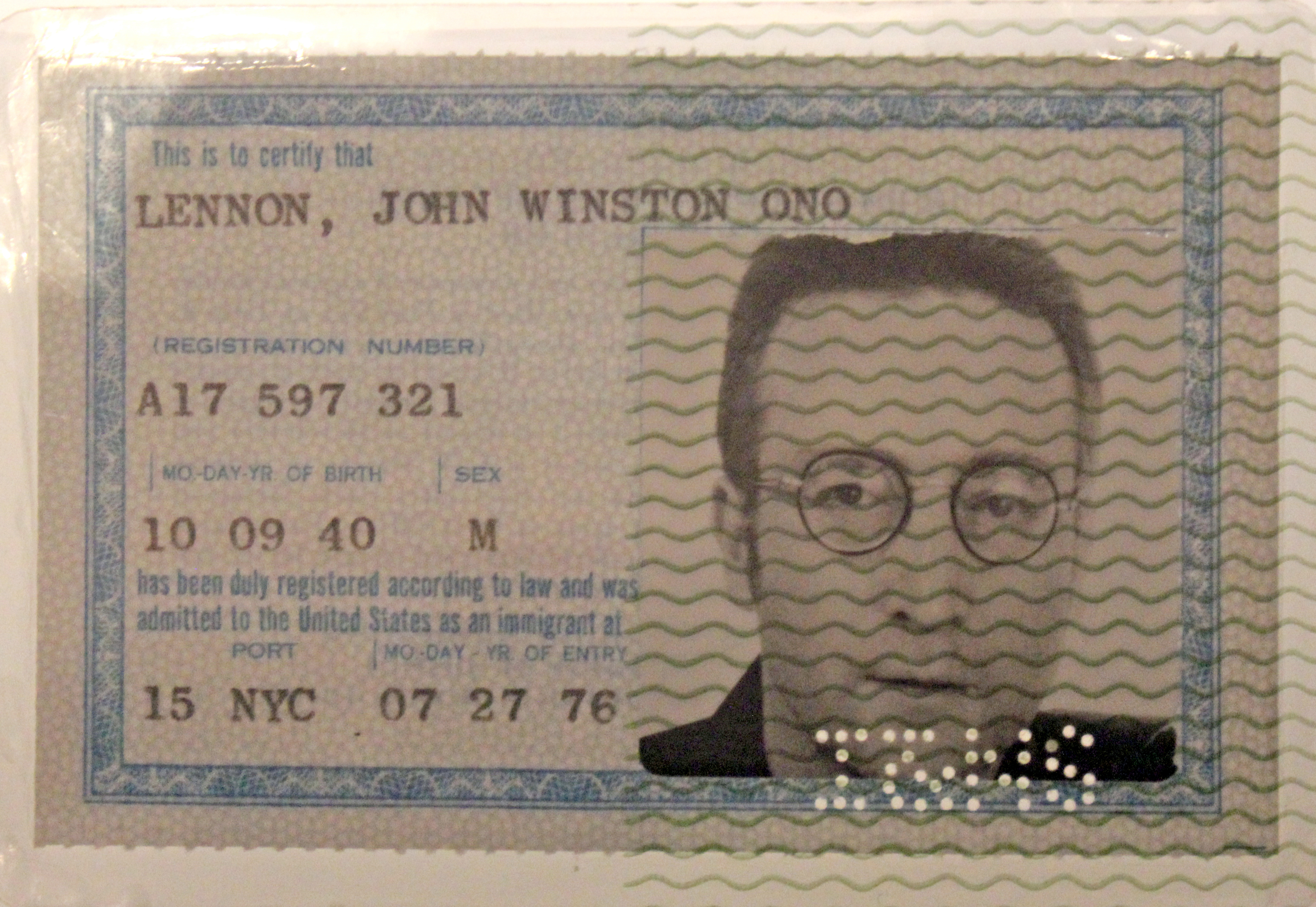
A 1976 card issued by the INS to John Lennon, stating the following: "This is to certify that [Lennon] has been duly registered according to law and was admitted to the United States as an immigrant."

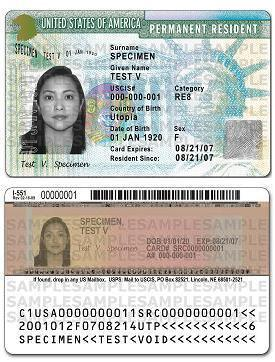
Permanent resident card (2010)

An LPR can file an application for naturalization after five years of continuous residency in the United States. This period may be shortened to three years if married to a U.S. citizen or one year during service with the U.S. armed forces. An LPR may submit their applications for naturalization as early as 90 days before meeting the residency requirement. In addition to continuous residency, the applicants must demonstrate good moral character, pass both an English test and a civics test, and demonstrate attachment to the U.S. Constitution. In the summer of 2018, a new program was initiated to help LPRs prepare themselves for naturalization.

Like U.S. citizens, LPRs can sponsor certain family members to immigrate to the United States, but the number of family members of LPRs who can immigrate is limited by an annual cap, and there is a years-long backlog.

=== 2019 "public charge" restrictions on awarding Green cards ===
On August 12, 2019, U.S. Citizenship and Immigration Services (USCIS) formally announced a new rule restricting poorer immigrants from attaining LPR status. Under the rule, which was slated to take effect on October 15, 2019, legal immigrants who have received public benefits such as Supplemental Security Income, Temporary Assistance for Needy Families, the Supplemental Nutrition Assistance Program, Medicaid, and public housing assistance for more than a total of twelve months may be classified as a "public charge" ineligible for permanent residency. Immigration official may investigate the health, income, wealth, education, and family of applicants for permanent residency to predict whether they will become a public charge in the future. The term "public charge" appears in the Immigration and Nationality Act, but is not defined by the law. Refugees, asylum seekers, pregnant women, children, and family members of those serving in the Armed Forces are excluded from the restrictions. The Trump administration estimated that 58% of households headed by non-citizens use a public welfare program and half use Medicaid. The Migration Policy Institute estimated that half of all Green Card applicants would be excluded by the rule.

Kenneth T. Cuccinelli II, the former acting director of USCIS, stated the policy will "have the long-term benefit of protecting taxpayers by ensuring people who are immigrating to this country don't become public burdens, that they can stand on their own two feet, as immigrants in years past have done." The National Immigration Law Center stated that the rule "will have a dire humanitarian impact, forcing some families to forgo critical lifesaving health care and nutrition. The damage will be felt for decades to come." The law center announced it would sue to prevent the policy from taking effect.

During his campaign for President of the United States, Joe Biden criticized the Public Charge rule and pledged to revoke it. On February 2, 2021, President Biden signed an executive order that the U.S. Department of Homeland Security review the policy, amongst others. In 2025, president Donald Trump began deportation proceedings against permanent residents Mahmoud Khalil, Yunseo Chung and Mohsen Mahdawi related to political activism.

== Types of immigration ==
A foreign national may obtain permanent residency in the United States primarily through the following:

- Sponsorship by a family member
- Employment (immigrant workers and investors)
- Apply as a special immigrant (religious worker)
- Apply as human trafficking and crime victims
- Apply as victims of abuse
- Other categories (e.g. Diversity Visa)
- Through registry (For certain people who have resided continuously in the U.S. since before Jan. 1, 1972)

=== Immigration eligibility and quotas ===
Category	Eligibility	Annual quota^{c}	Immigrant visa backlog
Family-sponsored
IR	Immediate relative (spouse, children under 21 years of age, and parents) of U.S. citizens (U.S. citizens must be at least 21 years of age in order to sponsor their parents.)	No numerical limit^{a}	
F1	Unmarried sons and daughters (21 years of age or older) of U.S. citizens	23,400	8 – 19 years^{b}
F2A	Spouse and minor children (under 21 years of age) of lawful permanent residents	87,934	1 – 3 years^{b}
F2B	Unmarried sons and daughters (21 years of age or older) of permanent residents	26,266	9 – 18 years^{b}
F3	Married sons and daughters of U.S. citizens	23,400	14 – 26 years^{b}
F4	Brothers and sisters of U.S. citizens	65,000	17 – 26 years^{b}
Employment-based^{c}
EB-1	Priority workers. There are three sub-groups: 1. Foreign nationals with extraordinary ability in sciences, arts, education, business, or athletics; 2. Foreign nationals that are outstanding professors or researchers with at least three years' experience in teaching or research and who are recognized internationally; 3. Foreign nationals that are managers and executives subject to international transfer to the United States.	41,455	currently available – 4 years^{b}
EB-2	Professionals holding advanced degrees (Ph.D., master's degree, or at least five years of progressive post-baccalaureate experience) or persons of exceptional ability in sciences, arts, or business	41,455	currently available – 12 years^{b}
EB-3	Skilled workers, professionals, and other workers	41,455	1 year – 12 years^{b}
EB-4	Certain special immigrants: ministers, religious workers, current or former U.S. government workers, etc.	10,291	4 years^{b}
EB-5	Investors, for investing either $900,000 in rural projects creating over 10 American jobs or $1.8 million in other developments	10,291	currently available – 11 years (China-born individuals)^{b}
Diversity immigrant (DV)		55,000^{b}	
Refugee (includes asylum seekers)		7,500	
^{a} 300,000–500,000 immediate relatives admitted annually.^{b} No more than 7 percent of the visas may be issued to natives of any one country. Currently, individuals from China (mainland), India, Mexico and the Philippines are subject to per-country quotas in most of the categories, and the waiting time may take longer (up to 11 years).^{c} Spouses and minor children (under 21) may apply for immigrant visa adjudication with their spouse or parent. The quotas include not only the principal applicants but also their derivatives.

== Application process ==
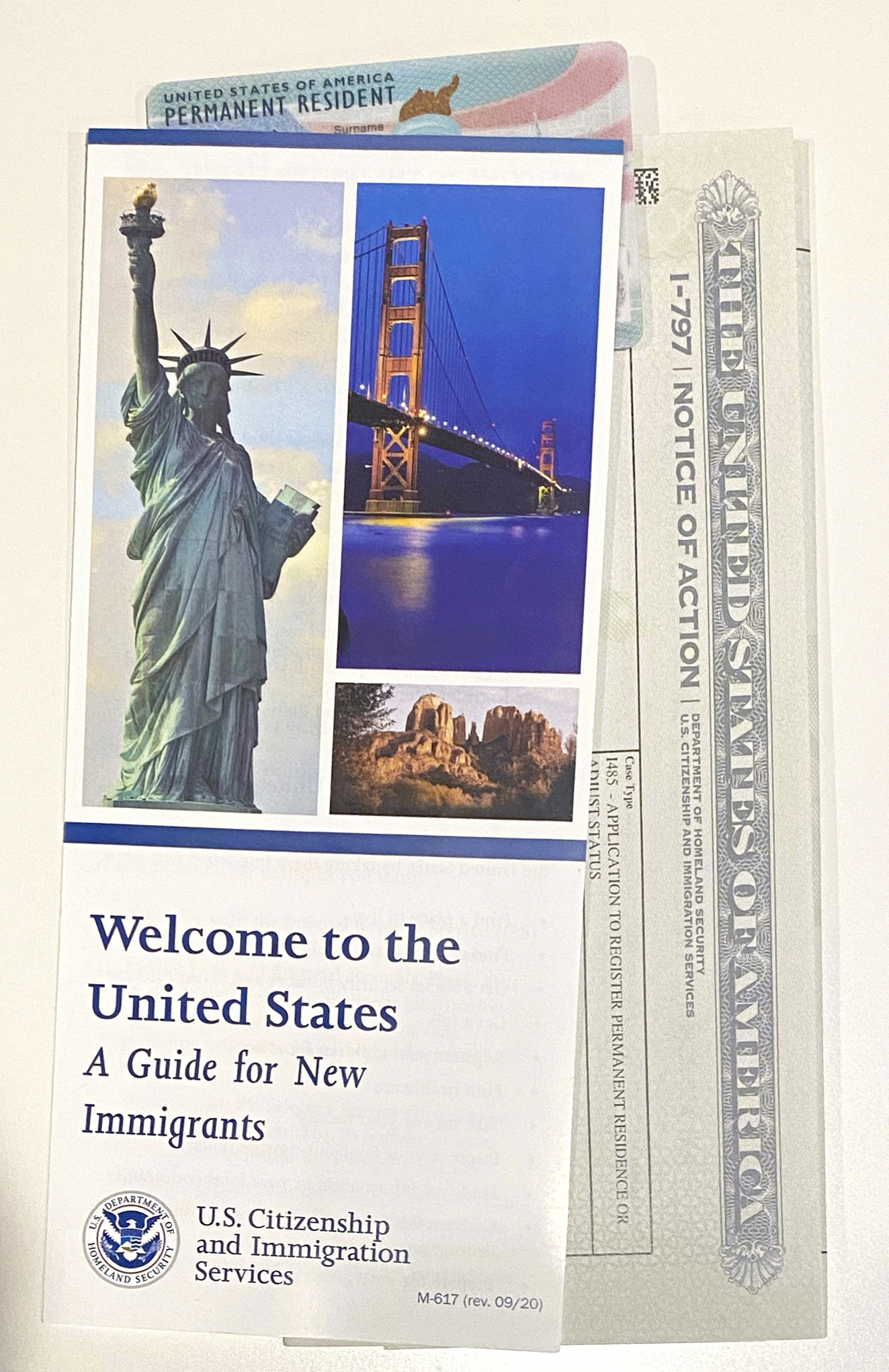
A welcome guide USCIS sends to a new immigrant along with their green card after immigration approval

Applications for permanent resident cards (green cards) were decided by the Immigration and Naturalization Service (INS) until 2003 when the INS was abolished and replaced by the current Department of Homeland Security (DHS). The whole process may take several years, depending on the type of immigrant category and the country of chargeability. An immigrant usually has to go through a three-step process to get permanent residency:

1. Immigrant petition (Form I-140 or Form I-130) – in the first step, USCIS approves the immigrant petition by a qualifying relative, an employer, or in rare cases, such as with an investor visa, the applicant themself. If a sibling is applying, they must have the same parents as the applicant.
2. Immigrant visa availability – in the second step, unless the applicant is an "immediate relative", an immigrant visa number through the National Visa Center (NVC) of the United States Department of State (DOS) must be available. A visa number might not be immediately available even if the USCIS approves the petition, because the number of immigrant visa numbers is limited every year by quotas set in the Immigration and Nationality Act (INA). There are also certain additional limitations by country of chargeability. Thus, most immigrants will be placed on lengthy waiting lists. Those immigrants who are immediate relatives of a U.S. citizen (spouses and children under 21 years of age, and parents of a U.S. citizen who is 21 years of age or older) are not subject to these quotas and may proceed to the next step immediately, since they qualify for the IR immigrant category.
3. Immigrant visa adjudication – in the third step, when an immigrant visa number becomes available, the applicant must either apply with USCIS to adjust their current status to permanent resident status or apply with the DOS for an immigrant visa at the nearest U.S. consulate before being allowed to come to the United States.
  - Adjustment of status (AOS) – Adjustment of status is for when the immigrant is in the United States and entered the U.S. legally. Except for immediate relatives of U.S. citizens, the immigrant must also be in legal status at the time of applying for adjustment of status. For immediate relatives and other relative categories whose visa numbers are current, adjustment of status can be filed for at the same time with the petition (step 1 above). Adjustment of status is submitted to USCIS via form I-485, Application to Register Permanent Residence or Adjust Status. The USCIS conducts a series of background checks, including fingerprinting for FBI criminal background check and name checks, and makes a decision on the application. Once the adjustment of status application is accepted, the alien is allowed to stay in the United States even if the original period of authorized stay on the Form I-94 is expired, but they are generally not allowed to leave the country until the application is approved, or the application will be abandoned. If the alien has to leave the United States during this time, they can apply for travel documents at the USCIS with form I-131, also called Advance parole. If there is a potential risk that the applicant's work permit (visa) will expire or become invalid, such as when employees are laid off by the employer and visa sponsor, or the applicant wants to start working in the United States, while they are waiting for the decision about their application to change status, they can file form I-765, to get Employment Authorization Documents (also called EAD) and be able to continue or start working legally in the United States. In some cases, the applicant will be interviewed at a USCIS office, especially if it is a marriage-based adjustment from a K-1 visa, in which case both spouses (the US citizen and the applicant) will be interviewed by the USCIS. If the application is approved, the alien becomes an LPR, and the actual green card is mailed to the alien's last known mailing address.
  - Consular processing – This is the process if the immigrant is outside the United States, or is ineligible for AOS. It still requires the immigrant visa petition to be first completed and approved. The applicant may make an appointment at the U.S. embassy or consulate in their home country, where a consular officer adjudicates the case. If the case is approved, an immigrant visa is issued by the U.S. embassy or consulate. The visa entitles the holder to travel to the United States as an immigrant. At the port of entry, the immigrant visa holder immediately becomes a permanent resident, and is processed for a permanent resident card and receives an I-551 stamp in their passport. The permanent resident card is mailed to their U.S. address within 120 days.

An applicant in the United States can obtain two permits while the case is pending after a certain stage is passed in green card processing (filing of I-485).

- The first is a temporary work permit known as the Employment Authorization Document (EAD), which allows the alien to take employment in the United States.
- The second is a temporary travel document, advance parole, which allows the alien to re-enter the United States. Both permits confer benefits that are independent of any existing status granted to the alien. For example, the alien might already have permission to work in the United States under an H-1B visa.

=== Application process for family-sponsored visa ===
U.S. citizens may sponsor for permanent residence in the United States the following relatives:

1. Spouses, and unmarried children under the age of 21;
2. Parents (once the U.S. citizen is at least 21 years old);
3. Unmarried children over the age of 21 (called "sons and daughters");
4. Married sons and daughters;
5. Brothers and sisters (once the U.S. citizen is at least 21 years old).

U.S. nationals and permanent residents may sponsor for permanent residence in the United States the following relatives:

1. Spouses, and unmarried children under the age of 21;
2. Unmarried children over the age of 21 (called "sons and daughters");

The Department of State's "Visa Bulletin", issued every month, gives the priority date for those petition beneficiaries currently entitled to apply for immigrant status through immigrant visas or adjustment of status. There is no annual quota for the spouses, unmarried children, and parents of U.S. citizens, so there is no waiting period for these applicants—just the required processing time. However, all other family-based categories have significant backlogs, even with a U.S. citizen petitioner.

Regardless of whether the family member being sponsored is located in the United States (and therefore likely to be applying for adjustment of status) or outside the United States (in which case the immigrant visa is the likely option), the process begins with the filing of an I-130 Petition for Alien Relative. The form and instructions can be found on the U.S. Citizenship and Immigration Services website. Required later in the process will be additional biographic data regarding the beneficiary (the person being sponsored) and a medical examination. Additional documents, such as police certificates, may be required depending on whether immigrant visa (consular processing) or adjustment of status is being utilized. All petitioners must supply the I-864 Affidavit of Support.

==== Green-card holders and families ====
Green-card holders married to non-U.S. citizens are able to legally bring their spouses and minor children to join them in the US, but must wait for their priority date to become current. The foreign spouse of a green-card holder must wait for approval of an "immigrant visa" from the State Department before entering the United States. Due to numerical limitation on the number of these visas, the wait time for approval may be months or years. In the interim, the spouse cannot be legally present in the United States, unless they secure a visa by some other means. Green-card holders may petition for permanent residency for their spouse and children.

U.S. green-card holders have experienced separation from their families, sometimes for years. A mechanism to unite families of green-card holders was created by the LIFE Act by the introduction of a "V visa", signed into law by President Clinton. The law expired on December 31, 2000, and V visas are no longer available. Several bills have been introduced in Congress to reinstate V visas, but so far none have been successful.

==== Improving the application process in obtaining a green card ====
The most common challenges that USCIS faces in providing services in the green card process are: (1) the length of the application and approval process, and (2) the quotas of green cards granted. USCIS tries to shorten the time qualified applicants wait to receive permanent residence.

===== Challenges with processing time of application =====
Under the current system, immediate family members (spouse, child, and dependent mother and father), have priority status for green cards and generally wait 6 months to a year to have their green card application approved. For non-immediate family members, the process may take up to 10 years. Paperwork is processed on a first-come, first-served basis, so new applications may go untouched for several months. To address the issue of slow processing times, USCIS has made a policy allowing applicants to submit the I-130 and I-485 forms at the same time. This has reduced the processing time. Another delay in the process comes when applications have mistakes. In these cases papers are sent back to the applicant, further delaying the process. Currently the largest cause of long wait times is not processing time, but rather immigrant visa quotas set by Congress.

===== Quota system challenges =====
Because of numerical quotas in many immigration categories, long wait times often prevent immigrants from receiving immigrant visas in a short time frame. The Augusta Chronicle in 2006 stated that an estimated two million people are on waiting lists in anticipation to become legal and permanent residents of the United States. Immigrants need visas to get off of these waiting lists, and Congress would need to change immigration law in order to accommodate them with legal status.

The number of green cards that can be granted to family-based applicants depends on what preference category they fall under. An unlimited number of immediate relatives can receive green cards because there is no quota for that category. Family members who fall under the other various preference categories have fixed quotas; however, the number of visas issued from each category may vary because unused visas from one category may roll over into another category.

=== Application process for employment-based visa ===
Many immigrants opt for this route, which typically requires an employer to "sponsor" (i.e., to petition before USCIS) the immigrant (known as the alien beneficiary) through a presumed future job (in some special categories, the applicant may apply on their behalf without a sponsor). The three-step process outlined above is described here in more detail for employment-based immigration applications. After the process is complete, the alien is expected to take the certified job offered by the employer to substantiate their immigrant status, since the application ultimately rests on the alien's employment with that company in that particular position.

As of Q2 in FY2025, standard processing to get an employer-sponsored green card took an average of 1,256 days—roughly 3.5 years—an increase of 18 months since 2016, and the longest time on record.

1. Immigrant petition – the first step includes the pre-requisite Permanent Labor Certification upon which the actual petition will reside.
  - Permanent Labor Certification – the employer must legally prove that it has a need to hire an alien for a specific position and that there is no minimally qualified U.S. citizen or LPR available to fill that position, hence the reason for hiring the alien. Some of the requirements to prove this situation include: proof of advertising for the specific position; skill requirements particular to the job; verification of the prevailing wage for a position; and the employer's ability to pay. This is currently done through an electronic system known as PERM. The date when the Permanent Labor Certification application is filed becomes the applicant's priority date. In some cases, for highly skilled foreign nationals (EB1 and EB2 National Interest Waiver, e.g. researchers, athletes, artists or business executives) and "Schedule A" labor (nurses and physical therapists), this step is waived. This step is processed by the United States Department of Labor (DOL). The Permanent Labor Certification is valid for 6 months from the time it is approved.
  - Immigrant petition – the employer applies on the alien's behalf to obtain a visa number. The application is form I-140, Immigrant Petition for Alien Workers, and it is processed by the USCIS. There are several EB (employment-based) immigrant categories (i.e., EB1-EA, EB2-NIW, EB5) under which the alien may apply, with progressively stricter requirements, but often shorter waiting times. Many of the applications are processed under the EB3 category. Currently, this process takes up to 6 months. Many of the EB categories allow expedited processing of this stage, known as "premium processing".
2. Immigrant visa availability. When the immigrant petition is approved by the USCIS, the petition is forwarded to the NVC for visa allocation. Currently this step centers around the priority date concept.
  - Priority date – the visa becomes available when the applicant's priority date is earlier than the cutoff date announced on the DOS's Visa Bulletin or when the immigrant visa category the applicant is assigned to is announced as "current". A "current" designation indicates that visa numbers are available to all applicants in the corresponding immigrant category. Petitions with priority dates earlier than the cutoff date are expected to have visas available, therefore those applicants are eligible for final adjudication. When the NVC determines that a visa number could be available for a particular immigrant petition, a visa is tentatively allocated to the applicant. The NVC will send a letter stating that the applicant may be eligible for adjustment of status, and requiring the applicant to choose either to adjust status with the USCIS directly, or apply at the U.S. consulate abroad. This waiting process determines when the applicant can expect the immigration case to be adjudicated. Due to quotas imposed on EB visa categories, there are more approved immigrant petitions than visas available under INA. High demand for visas has created a backlog of approved but unadjudicated cases. In addition, due to processing inefficiencies throughout DOS and USCIS systems, not all visas available under the quota system in a given year were allocated to applicants by the DOS.
3. Immigrant visa adjudication. When the NVC determines that an immigrant visa is available, the case can be adjudicated. If the alien is already in the US, that alien has a choice to finalize the green card process via adjustment of status in the U.S., or via consular processing abroad. If the alien is outside of the United States they can only apply for an immigrant visa at the U.S. consulate. The USCIS does not allow an alien to pursue consular processing and AOS simultaneously. Prior to filing the form I-485 (Adjustment of Status) it is required that the applicant have a medical examination performed by a USCIS-approved civil surgeon. The examination includes a blood test and specific immunizations, unless the applicant provides proof that the required immunizations were already done elsewhere. The civil surgeon hands the applicant a sealed envelope containing a completed form I-693, which must be included unopened with the I-485 application.
  - Adjustment of status (AOS) – after the alien has a Permanent Labor Certification and has been provisionally allocated a visa number, the final step is to change their status to permanent residency. Adjustment of status is submitted to USCIS via form I-485, Application to Register Permanent Residence or Adjust Status. If an immigrant visa number is available, the USCIS will allow "concurrent filing": it will accept forms I-140 and I-485 submitted in the same package or will accept form I-485 even before the approval of the I-140.
  - Consular processing – this is an alternative to AOS, but still requires the immigrant visa petition to be completed. Prior to 2005, this process was somewhat faster than applying for AOS, so was sometimes used to circumvent long backlogs (of over two years in some cases). However, due to recent efficiency improvements by the USCIS, it is not clear whether applying via consular processing is faster than the regular AOS process. Consular processing is also thought to be riskier since there is no or very little recourse for appeal if the officer denies the application.

=== Green card lottery ===
Each year, up to 55,000 immigrant visas are made available through the Diversity Visa (DV) program, also known as the Green Card Lottery, to people who were born in countries with low rates of immigration to the United States (fewer than 50,000 immigrants in the past five years). Applicants can only qualify by country of chargeability, not by citizenship. Anyone who is selected under this lottery will be given the opportunity to apply for permanent residence. They can also file for their spouse and any unmarried children under the age of 21.

If permanent residence is granted, the winner (and their family, if applicable) receives an immigrant visa in their passport(s) that has to be "activated" within six months of issuance at any port of entry to the United States. If already in the U.S. adjustment of status may be pursued. The new immigrant receives a stamp on the visa as proof of lawful admittance to the United States, and the individual is now authorized to live and work permanently in the United States. Finally, the actual "green card" typically arrives by mail within a few months.

In December 2025, the lottery was suspended.

==== Green card lottery scams ====
There is a growing number of fraudulent green card lottery scams, in which false agents take money from applicants by promising to submit application forms for them. Most agents are not working for the distribution service. Some claim that they can increase the chance of winning the lottery, when in fact, they may delay or not submit the application. Likewise, some claim to provide to winners free airline tickets or other benefits, such as submissions in future years or cash funds. There is no way to guarantee their claims, and there are numerous nefarious reasons for them not to fulfill their promises. Applicants are advised to use only official U.S. government websites, in which the URL ends in .gov.

==== Green card lottery e-mail fraud ====
Other fraud perpetrators will e-mail potential victims posing as State Department or other government officials with requests to wire or transfer money online as part of a "processing fee". These fraudulent e-mails are designed to steal money from unsuspecting victims. The senders often use illegitimate e-mail addresses and logos designed to make them look more like official government correspondence. One easy way to tell that an email address is fraudulent is that it does not end with ".gov". One particularly common fraud email asks potential victims to wire money via Western Union to an individual (the name varies) at the following address in the United Kingdom: 24 Grosvenor Square, London. These emails come from a variety of email addresses designed to impersonate the U.S. State Department. The USCIS blog has published information on this email scam and how to report fraudulent emails to the authorities. The U.S. government has issued warnings about this type of fraud or similar business practices.

=== Application process for undocumented immigrants through registry provision ===
Moreover, applicants who are in the United States unlawfully may be eligible to receive a green card under a sole exception. For an undocumented immigrant to be granted permanent residency they must abide by the registry date and eligibility criteria. The registry provision date was first developed in 1929 with the intention to aid in the growing number of undocumented immigrants. Essentially, only immigrants who entered the United States before a certain date (registry date) qualify to receive a green card. Other parameters include continued stay since entering the country and good moral character. Congress advanced the registry date a total of four times after the provision was first created in 1929. First set only to grant residency to individuals who entered the country before or on June 3, 1921, the date was then moved to July 1, 1924, further to July 1, 1940, once more to June 30, 1948, and finally to January 1, 1972. The last advancement date comprised the Immigration Reform and Control Act (IRCA) along with other regularization provisions which included penalizing institutions that knowingly employed undocumented aliens. This was done through a set of congressional amendments that culminated in 1958 Act, where the requirement for non-citizens to be eligible only if they are not subject to deportation was removed. Since then the registry date has not been advanced despite the number of immigrants increasing by 10 million and a total of 385 individuals have been granted a green card since the last registry update in 1986. Currently the provision date only excludes non-citizens that are inadmissible to the United States on criminal or national-security grounds. The updated and current eligibility requirements for registry are as follows:

- The person entered the United States prior to Jan. 1, 1972
- The person has resided in the United States continuously since they entered
- The person is a person of good moral character
- The person is not ineligible for naturalization (citizenship)
- The person is not removable (deportable) under Section 237(a)(4)(B) of the Immigration and Nationality Act (INA)
- The person is not inadmissible under Section 212(a)(3)(E) of the INA or as a criminal, procurer, other immoral person, subversive, violator of the narcotics laws or noncitizen smuggler

=== Inadmissibility Based on Political Affiliation ===
On October 2, 2020, the USCIS declared the inadmissibility based on belonging or affiliation to Communist parties or any, unspecified, "totalitarian party". Membership or affiliation with such parties, whether US or foreign, would be incompatible with the oath of allegiance to the naturalization of the United States of America, which includes a commitment to "support and defend the Constitution and laws of the United States". Exceptions to the inadmissibility rule include circumstances where membership is: "Involuntary; Solely when under 16 years of age; By operation of law; or For purposes of obtaining employment, food rations, or other essentials of living and where necessary for such purposes." The ban would affect current members of Chinese Communist Party and Communist Youth League of China, for example.

== Rights and responsibilities of a lawful permanent resident ==
Lawful permanent residents, also known as green card holders, have certain rights and responsibilities as highlighted by the United States Citizenship and Immigration Services and other federal agencies.

LPRs can secure many types of jobs just like U.S. citizens can. LPRs can register property under their names and live anywhere within the United States. They can similarly operate any type of business in the United States.

LPRs are also subject to similar obligations as U.S. citizens. For example, male LPRs between the ages of 18 and 25 are subject to registering in the Selective Service System. Like U.S. citizens, LPRs must pay taxes on their worldwide income (this includes filing annual U.S. income tax returns). LPRs are not permitted to vote in federal elections and they cannot be elected to federal office. They may vote in certain local elections, and hold local and state offices (subject to state/city law and Constitutionality).

=== Rights ===
- Reside permanently in the United States provided they do not commit actions that would make them removable under the INA.
- Join and serve in the United States Armed Forces, including in many law enforcement agencies.
- Work anywhere in the United States (with the exception of federal jobs requiring security clearances and some companies under contract by the federal government).
- Be protected equally by the law of the United States, their State of residence, and local jurisdictions.
- Travel freely outside the United States for up to one year as a tourist.
- Petition for (or sponsor) certain family members to immigrate to the United States as lawful permanent residents. Such family members include spouse and unmarried children of any age.

=== Responsibilities ===
- Required to obey all laws of the United States, including state laws, and localities.
- Required to file income tax returns and report income to the U.S. Internal Revenue Service (IRS) and state taxing authorities.
- Register with the Selective Service System (if male and aged 18 through 25).

== Conditional permanent residents ==
As part of immigration reform under the Immigration Reform and Control Act of 1986 (IRCA), as well as further reform enacted in the Illegal Immigration Reform and Immigrant Responsibility Act of 1996 (IIRIRA), eligible persons who properly apply for permanent residency based on either a recent marriage to a U.S. citizen or as an investor are granted such privilege only on a conditional basis, for two years. An exception to this rule is the case of a U.S. citizen legally sponsoring a spouse in which the marriage at the time of the adjustment of status (I-485) is more than two years old. In this case, the conditional status is waived and a 10-year "permanent resident card" is issued after the USCIS approves the case. A permanent resident under the conditional clause may receive an I-551 stamp as well as a permanent resident card. The expiration date of the conditional period is two years from the approval date. The immigrant visa category is CR (conditional resident).

When this two-year conditional period is over, the permanent residence automatically expires and the applicant is subject to deportation and removal unless, up to 90 days before the conditional residence expires, the applicant files form I-751 Petition to Remove Conditions on Residence (if conditional permanent residence was obtained through marriage) or form I-829 Petition by Entrepreneur to Remove Conditions (if conditional permanent residence was obtained through investment) with USCIS to have the conditions removed. Once the application is received, permanent residence is extended in 1-year intervals until the request to remove conditions is approved or denied. For conditional permanent residence obtained through marriage, both spouses must sign form I-751; if the spouses are divorced, it is possible to get a waiver of the other spouse's signing requirement, if it can be proved that the marriage was bona fide.

The USCIS requires that the application for the removal of conditions provide both general and specific supporting evidence that the basis on which the applicant obtained conditional permanent residence was not fraudulent. For an application based on marriage, birth certificates of children, joint financial statements, and letters from employers, friends and relatives are some types of evidence that may be accepted. That is to ensure that the marriage was in good faith and not a fraudulent marriage of convenience with a sole intention of obtaining a green card. A follow-up interview with an immigration officer is sometimes required but may be waived if the submitted evidence is sufficient. Both the spouses must usually attend the interview.

The applicant receives an I-551 stamp in their foreign passport upon approval of their case. The applicant is then free from the conditional requirement once the application is approved. The applicant's new permanent resident card arrives via mail to their house several weeks to several months later and replaces the old two-year conditional residence card. The new card must be renewed after 10 years, but permanent resident status is now granted for an indefinite term if residence conditions are satisfied at all times. The USCIS may request to renew the card earlier because of security enhancements of the card or as a part of a revalidation campaign to exclude counterfeit green cards from circulation.

The two-year conditional residence period counts toward satisfying a residency requirement for U.S. naturalization, and other purposes. Application for the removal of conditions must be adjudicated before a separate naturalization application can be reviewed by the USCIS on its own merits.

=== Differences between permanent residents and conditional permanent residents ===
Conditional permanent residents have all of the equal "rights, privileges, responsibilities and duties which apply to all other lawful permanent residents." The only difference is the requirement to satisfy the conditions (such as showing marriage status or satisfying entrepreneur requirements) before the two-year period ends.

== Abandonment or loss of permanent residence status ==
A green-card holder may abandon permanent residence by filing form I-407, with the green card, at a U.S. Embassy.

Under certain conditions, permanent residence status can be lost involuntarily. This includes committing a criminal act that makes a person removable from the United States (an aggravated felony). A person might also be found to have abandoned their status if they move to another country to live there permanently, stay outside the US for more than one year (without getting a re-entry permit before leaving), or fail to file an income tax return on their worldwide income. Permanent resident status can also be lost if it is found that the application or grounds for obtaining permanent residence was fraudulent. The failure to renew the permanent resident card does not result in the loss of status, except in the case of conditional permanent residents as noted above. Nevertheless, failure to renew the card can result in loss of work eligibility and the ability to travel.

A person who loses permanent residence status is immediately removable from the United States and must leave the country as soon as possible or face deportation and removal. In some cases the person may be banned from entering the country for three or seven years, or even permanently.

=== Tax costs of green card relinquishment ===
Due to the Heart Act foreign workers who have owned a green card in eight of the last 15 years and choose to relinquish it will be subject to the expatriation tax, which taxes unrealized gains above $600,000, anywhere in the world. However this will only apply to those people who have a federal tax liability greater than $139,000 a year or have a worth of more than $2 million or have failed to certify to the IRS that they have been in compliance with U.S. federal tax obligations for the past five years.

If the green card is not relinquished, then the holder is subject to double taxation when living or working outside of the United States, whether or not within their home nation, although double taxation may be mitigated by foreign tax credits.

== Reading a permanent resident card ==
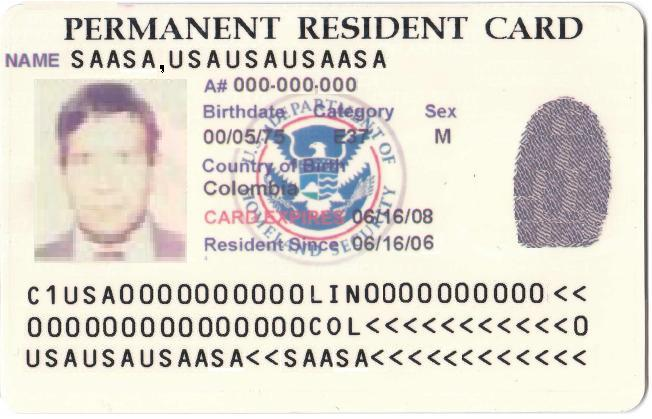
Pre-2008 permanent resident card, bearing the seal of the United States Department of Homeland Security

While most of the information on the card is self-evident, the computer- and human-readable signature at the bottom is not. The format follows the machine-readable travel document TD1 format:

- First line:

1–2: C1 or C2. C1 = resident within the United States, C2 = permanent resident commuter (living in Canada or Mexico)
3–5: USA (issuing country, United States)
6–14: 9-digit number (A#, alien number)
15: check digit over digits 6–14
16–30: 13-character USCIS receipt number, padded with "<" as a filler character

- Second line:

1–6: birth date (in YYMMDD format)
7: check digit over digits 1–6
8: gender
9–14: expiration date (in YYMMDD format)
15: check digit over digits 9–14
16–29: country of birth
30: cumulative check digit (over digits 6–30 (upper line), 1–7, 9–15, 19–29 (lower line))

- Third line:

surname, given name, middle name, first initial of father, first initial of mother (this line is spaced with "<<" between the surname and given name). Depending on the length of the name, the father's and mother's initials may be omitted.

A full list of category codes (i.e. IR1, E21, etc.) can be found in the Code of Federal Regulations or Foreign Affairs Manual.

Since May 11, 2010, new green cards contain an RFID chip and can be electronically accessed at a distance. They are shipped with a protective sleeve intended to protect the card from remote access, but it is reported to be inadequate.

== Visa-free travel for U.S. permanent residents ==
The following countries and territories generally allow U.S. permanent residents to enter the country without a visa for purposes of tourism.

- Albania: 90 days within 180 days
- Anguilla: 90 days
- Antigua and Barbuda: 30 days
- Argentina: 90 days
- Bahamas: 30 days
- Belize: permanent residents of the USA can obtain a visa on arrival, provided prior approval is obtained from Belizean Immigration (fee US$50). Visitors may also have to pay a repatriation fee.
- Bermuda
- Bosnia and Herzegovina: 90 days within 180 days
- British Virgin Islands: 1 month
- Canada: 6 months (no eTA required)
- Cayman Islands: 30 days
- Costa Rica: 30 days
- Dominica: 6 months
- Dominican Republic: 30 days
- Dutch Caribbean (Aruba, Curaçao, Sint Maarten, Caribbean Netherlands): 30 days
- Georgia: 90 days within 180 days
- Guatemala: 90 days
- Honduras: 90 days
- Jamaica: 90 days
- Kosovo: 15 days
- Mexico: 180 days
- Montenegro: 30 days
- Nicaragua: 3 months
- Panama: 90 days
- Serbia: 90 days
- Turks and Caicos Islands: 30 days

== Suspension of the Diversity Visa Program ==
US Homeland Security Director Kristi Noem announced on 18 December 2025, by order of President Donald Trump, the United States Green Card Lottery program has been suspended. White House officials said the decision was made after it was determined that the main suspect in the 2025 Brown University shooting entered the United States through the green card lottery. Trump has long opposed the multicultural immigrant visa program, and the suspension of the lottery was done to advance his immigration policy goals.

== See also ==
- Blue Card (European Union)
- Canada Permanent Resident Card (PR Card), equivalent document in Canada
- Chinese Foreign Permanent Resident Identity Card
- Indefinite leave to remain in the United Kingdom
- Permanent residency
- Green card marriage
