= Foreign state of chargeability =

In United States immigration law, the foreign state of chargeability is the country determined to be the applicant's origin. In general, the applicant's country of birth will determine their country of chargeability. For certain applicants born in oversubscribed countries such as India and China, approval to be chargeable to another country can significantly reduce the waiting time for their adjustment of status or consular processing of their green card application. This process is also known as "alternate chargeability".

The rules, codified in section 202(b) of the Immigration and Nationality Act, allow USCIS to determine the country of chargeability according to the following rules:

- When an applicant is a child, accompanied by or joining a parent, the child may be charged to the foreign state of either parent.
- When an applicant is born in a country where neither of the parents was born in or a subject of, may be charged to the country of either parent. For example, if child A is born during a family vacation in Mexico, but both parents are from Germany, the applicant may be charged to Germany.
- When an applicant is chargeable to a different country than his or her spouse, the applicant may be charged to the country of his or her spouse.
- When an applicant is born in the United States, he or she shall be considered to be born in the country of citizenship. This may be the case for children of diplomats who do not automatically derive citizenship by birth in the United States.
