= EB-2 visa =

Employment-based visa for the United States

EB-2 is an immigrant visa preference category for United States employment-based permanent residency, created by the Immigration Act of 1990. The category includes "members of the professions holding advanced degrees or their equivalent", and "individuals who because of their exceptional ability in the sciences, arts, or business will substantially benefit prospectively the national economy, cultural or educational interests, or welfare of the United States, and whose services in the sciences, arts, professions, or business are sought by an employer in the United States". Applicants (with the exception of applicants applying for an exemption known as National Interest Waiver) must generally have an approved Permanent Labor Certification, a job offer, and their employer must have filed an Immigrant Petition for Alien Worker (Form I-140) with the USCIS.

== Eligibility criteria ==
The statutory requirements may be found in the Immigration and Nationality Act (INA) at Section 203(b)(2) (8 U.S.C. 1153(b)(2)). The regulatory requirements may be found in the Title 8 Code of Federal Regulations (8 CFR) at section 204.5(k).

There are two sub-categories of EB-2:

- Advanced Degree Professional. The criteria are:
  - Be a member of the professions holding an advanced degree.
    - An advanced degree is any United States academic or professional degree or a foreign equivalent degree above that of bachelor’s, such as a master's or PhD. A U.S. bachelor’s degree (or a foreign equivalent degree) followed by at least five years of progressive experience in the specialty is considered the equivalent of a master's degree.
  - The offered position must be a professional occupation, defined as one of the occupations listed at INA 101(a)(32) or one that requires the minimum of a bachelor’s degree or foreign equivalent degree for entry into the occupation.
  - Meet any job requirements specified on the labor certification as of the priority date.
- Exceptional Ability. The applicant must show "exceptional ability in the sciences, arts, or business", by satisfying 3 out of 6 criteria, or other comparable evidence of eligibility.
  - Official academic record showing a degree, diploma, certificate, or similar award from a college, university, school, or other institution of learning relating to the area of exceptional ability.
  - Letters from current or former employers documenting at least 10 years of full-time experience in the o.ccupation
  - A license to practice the profession or certification for the profession or occupation.
  - Evidence that the applicant have commanded a salary or other remuneration for services that demonstrates the applicant's exceptional ability.
  - Membership in a professional association(s).
  - Recognition for the applicant's achievements and significant contributions to the applicant's industry or field by the applicant's peers, government entities, professional or business organizations

Normally, EB-2 applicants must be employed by a specific U.S. employer who sponsors the EB-2 petition with a permanent job offer, and a "Permanent Labor Certification". The certification certifies that an EB-2 applicant must not be displacing "available, qualified, and willing U.S. workers to fill the position". It implements a protection of domestic labor, The labor certification is obtained by the employer. Procedurally, it goes as follows:

- The employer files the ETA-9089 with the Department of Labor (DOL). The DOL certifies it.
- The employer submits the certified document with Form I-140 to USCIS.

Applicants in a Schedula A occupation categories can have the Permanent Labor Certification waived, since the DOL has pre-certified that there are not enough available, qualified, and willing U.S. workers for occupations in these categories. The categories are:

- Group I: Physical therapists and professional nurses.
- Group II: People of exceptional ability in the sciences or arts (except performing arts), including college and university teachers. Exceptional ability in the performing arts.

The "National Interest Waiver" (NIW) waives the requirement to be employed by a specific U.S. employer. That is, it allows the applicant to self-petition. The applicant who is applying for NIW must still meet either the Advanced Degree Professional requirement or the Exceptional Ability requirement. The criteria are:

- The applicant's endeavor has "substantial merit and national importance". An "endeavor" is not just what the occupation normally involves, but what types of work the applicant proposes to undertake specifically within that occupation.
- The applicant is "well-positioned" to advance the endeavor. This may be demonstrated by, for example:
  - Applicant's education, skills, knowledge, and record of success in related or similar efforts.
  - Evidence of a detailed proposal or plan that the applicant developed, or played a significant role in developing, for future activities related to the proposed endeavor.
  - An explanation of how the applicant plans to pursue the applicant's endeavor (for example, while employed at a particular company or through your own company) and any progress towards pursuing the proposed endeavor.
  - Evidence of the interest or support the applicant have garnered from potential customers, users, investors, or other related entities or persons.
- Demonstrating that, on balance, it would be beneficial to the United States to waive the job offer and thus the permanent labor certification requirements. For example, the applicant plans to work furthering a critical and emerging technology or other STEM area important to U.S. competitiveness.

A special provision allows national interest waiver to be granted to physicians who agree to work full-time in areas with a shortage of healthcare professionals.

Entrepreneurs may also qualify for the EB-2 category under certain conditions.

== Quotas ==
As of September 2012, the Department of State determined that the FY-2012 numerical limit for the worldwide employment-based preference must be 144,951, and the per-country limit must be 7% of the worldwide cap, regardless of the population of the country. Out of this, the EB-2 category is limited to 28.6% of the worldwide level, plus any numbers not used by the EB-1 category ("spillover").

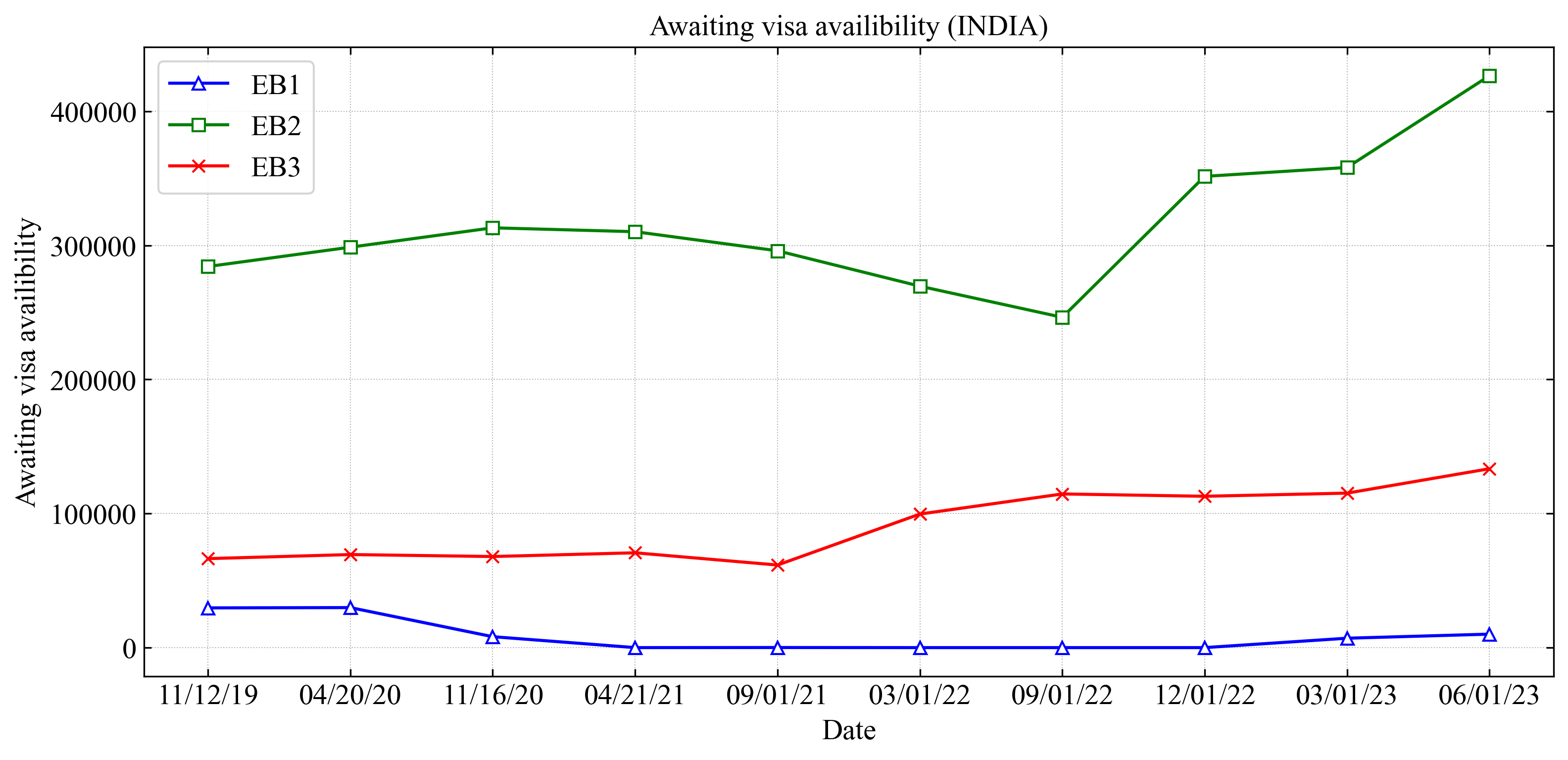
In the case of India, the number of EB2 petitions approved over the last decade far exceeds the number of green cards available, leading to a large number of India-born EB2 applicants in the backlog awaiting visa availability. As of June 2023, the backlog exceeds 426,000, whereas only 2800 green cards are normally available per year, excluding any spillovers.

== Application ==
The Bureau of Consular Affairs has more details about the application process.

EB-2 immigration categories normally require the Labor Certification application. Once the employer has obtained the Labor Certification, the employer can file an I-140 immigrant petition for an alien with the USCIS. One purpose of I-140 petition that requires a certified Labor Certification is to establish that the employer has the ability to pay the offered wage stated in the Labor Certification application. The employer must be able to prove its ability to pay the proffered wage at the time the priority date is established, and continuing until the beneficiary employee obtains the lawful permanent residence.

The requirement of bachelor's degree or equivalent in the EB-2 I-140 petition can be established only by academic education and degree. Here, the language equivalent in the I-140 petition is taken by the USCIS as an equivalent foreign degree, and not combination of education and experience.

Additionally, in the EB-2 based I-140 petition, even if the Labor Certification application stated that the employer would accept a combination of education and experience in lieu of the bachelor's degree, for the purpose of establishing the requirement of a bachelor's degree followed by five years of progressive requirement, the USCIS may not accept such proof to meet the threshold qualification requirement for the EB-2 I-140 petition.

The national interest waiver, or EB2-NIW, is an employment-based second preference petition. It is so named because it asks that the otherwise required Labor Certification requirement be waived "in the U.S. National Interest". Thus, a beneficiary of a successful National Interest Waiver petition is exempt from the requirement that his or her employer first obtain a Labor Certification from the U.S. Department of Labor. A person may qualify for the waiver of the Labor Certification or job offer requirement if they can show that their work will be in the national interest of the United States. This benefit is popularly called the National Interest Waiver. The burden of proof in National Interest Waiver cases rests solely with the petitioner.

While the U.S. Citizenship and Immigration Services (USCIS) has not established specific criteria for approving national interest waiver petitions, the USCIS Administrative Appeals Office (AAO) held, in Matter of Dhanasar, 26 I&N Dec. 884 (AAO 2016), that a National Interest Waiver may be granted when the petitioner demonstrates the following criteria by a preponderance of the evidence (more likely than not):

1. The foreign national's proposed endeavor has both substantial merit and national importance;
2. The foreign national is well positioned to advance the proposed endeavor; and
3. On the balance, it would be beneficial to the United States to waive the job offer and labor certification requirements.

The first criterion focuses on the specific endeavor the foreign national has proposed to undertake. The prospective impact may be local, national, or global in nature, but must have broad implications of national importance such as local economic improvement or a medical advance.

The second criterion focuses on whether the foreign national has the ability to succeed in the endeavor. The foreign national must be well positioned to advance the proposed endeavor, but is not required to show that he or she will succeed.

The third criterion focuses on whether in light of the nature of the foreign national's qualifications or proposed endeavor, it would be impractical either for the foreign national to secure a job offer or for the petitioner to obtain a labor certification; whether, even assuming that other qualified U.S. workers are available, the United States would still benefit from the foreign national's contributions; and whether the national interest in the foreign national's contributions is sufficiently urgent to warrant foregoing the labor certification process.

== Costs ==
As of September 2012, the Department of State application processing fee for employment-based immigrant visas is US$405. The fee for the USCIS Petition for Alien Worker (Form I-140) as of April 1, 2024 is US$715.
