= REAL ID Act =

United States law for identity documents

REAL ID Act of 2005
- Long title: An Act to establish and rapidly implement regulations for state driver's license and identification document security standards, to prevent terrorists from abusing the asylum laws of the United States, to unify terrorism-related grounds for inadmissibility and removal, and to ensure expeditious construction of the San Diego border fence.
- Enacted by: the 109th United States Congress
- Effective: Immigration provisions: May 11, 2005; Identification document provisions: May 11, 2008 (original); April 21, 2014–January 22, 2018 (state-based); May 7, 2025–May 5, 2027 (card-based)

Citations
- Public law: 109-13
- Statutes at Large: 119 Stat. 302

Codification
- Acts repealed: Intelligence Reform and Terrorism Prevention Act §§ 5402, 5403, 7212
- U.S.C. sections amended: Immigration provisions: 8 U.S.C. § 1101, § 1103, § 1153, §§ 1157–1159, § 1182, § 1184, § 1227, §§ 1230–1231, § 1252, § 1356; Identification document provisions: 49 U.S.C. § 30301 note

Legislative history
- Introduced in the House as H.R. 418 by Jim Sensenbrenner (R–WI) on January 26, 2005; Committee consideration by House Judiciary, House Homeland Security, House Government Reform, Senate Judiciary; Passed the House on February 10, 2005 (261–161; appended to H.R. 1268, passed 388–43 on March 16, 2005); Passed the Senate on April 21, 2005 (99–0, as part of H.R. 1268); Reported by the joint conference committee on May 3, 2005; agreed to by the House on May 5, 2005 (368–58) and by the Senate on May 10, 2005 (100–0); Signed into law by President George W. Bush on May 11, 2005

Major amendments
- Court Security Improvement Act of 2007 § 508; REAL ID Act Modification for Freely Associated States Act; CARES Act (PDF) § 16006; Consolidated Appropriations Act, 2021 (PDF) § 1001

United States Supreme Court cases
- Kucana v. Holder, 558 U.S. 233 (2010); Guerrero-Lasprilla v. Barr, No. 18-776, 589 U.S. ___ (2020); Nasrallah v. Barr, No. 18-1432, 590 U.S. ___ (2020); Wilkinson v. Garland, No. 22-666, 601 U.S. ___ (2024)

The REAL ID Act of 2005 is a United States federal law that standardized requirements for driver's licenses and identification cards issued by U.S. states and territories in order to be accepted for accessing U.S. government facilities, nuclear power plants, and for boarding airline flights in the United States.

The requirements include verification of the personal information presented when applying for the identification document, security features on the document, and electronic sharing of databases between states. The act also made modifications to U.S. immigration law regarding asylum, border security, deportation, and specific work visas.

Enacted in response to the September 11 attacks, the provisions regarding identification documents were originally intended to take effect in 2008, but enforcement was repeatedly delayed due to widespread opposition and refusal by many state governments to implement them. Eventually states began to comply in 2012, and enforcement based on the issuing state or territory began from 2014 to 2018 depending on the facility. After numerous extensions, by 2020, all states were certified as compliant, and by 2024, all territories were certified. Enforcement based on the identification documents began on May 7, 2025, and is scheduled to be implemented in phases until complete enforcement begins on May 5, 2027.

== Legislative history ==
In the United States, driver licenses and identification cards issued by the states and territories are widely used as a form of identification. Before the REAL ID Act, each state and territory set its own rules for issuing such cards, including what documents must be provided to obtain one, what information was displayed on the card, and its security features.

In response to the September 11 attacks, the U.S. government established the 9/11 Commission to provide recommendations to prevent future attacks. In its report, issued in July 2004, one of the commission's many recommendations was establishing federal standards for identification documents. In December 2004, the Intelligence Reform and Terrorism Prevention Act (IRTPA), enacted to implement the commission's recommendations, directed the secretary of transportation to form a negotiated rulemaking committee with representatives from state governments and the Department of Homeland Security, to issue regulations establishing standards for identification documents issued by the states, and prohibited federal agencies from accepting identification documents that did not conform to these standards.

In February 2005, less than two months after IRTPA was enacted, the House of Representatives passed the REAL ID Act as H.R. 418, introduced by Representative Jim Sensenbrenner (R-WI). The bill would repeal the provisions regarding identification documents in IRTPA, replace them with a version that would set the federal standards directly rather than in negotiation with the states, and would make various changes to U.S. immigration law regarding asylum, border security and deportation. In March, the text of the REAL ID Act was appended as a rider on an omnibus spending bill, H.R. 1268, the Emergency Supplemental Appropriations Act for Defense, the Global War on Terror, and Tsunami Relief 2005, which was passed by the House. The Senate removed the REAL ID Act from the bill, added sections regarding visas for workers, and passed it in April. In May, the conference report merging the bill versions, including the REAL ID Act added by the House and the visa sections added by the Senate, was agreed to by both houses, and the bill was signed into law by President George W. Bush on May 11, 2005. The identification document provisions of the REAL ID Act were codified as a note in 48 U.S.C. § 30301.

Although the title of the law has the term REAL ID in all capitals, it does not provide a meaning for REAL as an acronym. ID is a common acronym for identity document.

=== Amendments ===
On January 7, 2008, the Court Security Improvement Act of 2007 specified that federal judges could use their court address instead of their residential address on their identification documents for purposes of the REAL ID Act.

On December 17, 2018, Congress amended the REAL ID Act to remove an outdated reference to the Trust Territory of the Pacific Islands (terminated in 1994) and to clarify that citizens of its successor Freely Associated States (Marshall Islands, Micronesia and Palau) were eligible for driver licenses and identification cards when admitted to the United States.

On March 27, 2020, the CARES Act, enacted in response to the COVID-19 pandemic, extended the deadline for states to comply with the REAL ID Act to at least September 30, 2021.

On December 27, 2020, the Consolidated Appropriations Act, 2021 amended the REAL ID Act to accept electronic versions of identification documents, and to exempt states from requiring applicants to provide documentation of their Social Security number, such as their Social Security card. In states that chose not to require such documentation, applicants were still required to provide their Social Security number, which states would verify directly with the Social Security Administration. The amendment also repealed federal funds that the original law had provided for states to assist in their compliance.

== Provisions ==
=== Identification documents ===
The REAL ID Act prohibits federal agencies from accepting driver's licenses and identification cards issued by U.S. states and territories that do not satisfy certain standards, for the purposes of accessing federal government facilities, nuclear power plants, and boarding airline flights in the United States. The standards require that:

- Applicants for an identification document must provide documentation of their full name, date of birth, and residential address; a Social Security number or documentation that they are not eligible for one; and documentation that they are a U.S. national or a foreign national legally present in the United States.
- The state or territory must capture a photograph of the applicant, store digital images of the documents presented by the applicant, and verify the documents directly with the authorities that issued them. For example, the Social Security number must be verified with the Social Security Administration, and the legal presence of foreign nationals must be verified with the Department of Homeland Security (DHS) through the Systematic Alien Verification for Entitlements (SAVE).
- The state or territory must confirm that any existing identification document of the applicant issued by another state or territory is terminated; limit the validity of identification documents to eight years; implement background checks and fraud prevention programs for employees issuing identification documents; maintain an electronic database of identification documents issued, including driver histories and violations, and provide access to it to all other states and territories.
- The identification document must display the person's full name, date of birth, gender, photograph, address, signature, and document number, and must contain security features and machine-readable technology.

The REAL ID regulations, issued by the DHS, clarified some of the verification requirements:

- Applicants must provide at least two documents showing their address, but these documents do not need to be verified further.
- Birth certificates must be verified through the Electronic Verification of Vital Events (EVVE) system maintained by the National Association for Public Health Statistics and Information Systems (NAPHSIS), rather than the authority that issued the certificate.
- U.S. passports and visas on foreign passports must be verified with the Department of State, but the foreign passports themselves do not need to be verified with the issuing authority.

The system used to share databases of identification documents between states and territories is the State-to-State (S2S) Verification Service, supported by the State Pointer Exchange Services (SPEXS) platform, developed by the American Association of Motor Vehicle Administrators (AAMVA) with federal funds. Although the REAL ID Act requires that states and territories share their databases, this requirement was not included in the DHS criteria to certify their compliance.

States and territories are still allowed to issue identification documents that do not satisfy the REAL ID requirements, but in this case, the document must state that it may not be accepted for federal purposes.

=== Immigration ===
==== Asylum ====
The REAL ID Act increased the burden of proof for individuals applying for asylum. It authorized immigration judges to require that applicants present evidence for their asylum claim, if available, in addition to their testimony and to determine the credibility of witnesses based on their demeanor, plausibility, and consistency. The law also eliminated the numerical limit on individuals granted asylum, previously set at 10,000 per year.

==== Border security ====
The Illegal Immigration Reform and Immigrant Responsibility Act of 1996 had provided for improvements to the border barrier near San Diego, with a waiver of two specific environmental laws, the National Environmental Policy Act and the Endangered Species Act of 1973, which could otherwise prevent construction in the area. The REAL ID Act expanded this provision, allowing a waiver of any laws that could interfere with the construction. Later, the Secure Fence Act of 2006 and the Consolidated Appropriations Act, 2008 extended this provision to a much longer portion of the Mexico–United States border.

Other sections of the REAL ID Act ordered some reports and pilot projects related to border security.

==== Inadmissibility and deportation ====
The REAL ID Act expanded the grounds for inadmissibility and deportation of foreign nationals based on terrorist activities, including membership in terrorist organizations, endorsement or espousal of such activities, and receipt of military-type training from or on behalf of these groups. It also barred individuals deemed inadmissible on these grounds from challenging their deportation orders through habeas corpus, mandamus, or other petitions for judicial review.

==== Work visas ====
The Save Our Small and Seasonal Businesses Act of 2005, added to the REAL ID Act during its congressional passage, allowed foreign nationals who had an H-2B visa for temporary workers in any of the previous three years to apply as returning workers without counting toward the annual limit of that visa category.

A section of the REAL ID Act created the E-3 visa, a type of work visa for nationals of Australia and their dependents, with an annual limit of 10,500.

The last section of the REAL ID Act allocated up to 50,000 previously unused employment-based immigration visas for new applicants to work as physical therapists, nurses, or with exceptional ability in sciences or arts.

== Implementation ==
The REAL ID Act, enacted on May 11, 2005, specified that after three years, from May 11, 2008, federal agencies would no longer accept any identification documents issued by states and territories that did not start issuing documents that satisfied the standards. The statute did not directly prohibit federal agencies from accepting non-compliant identification documents issued by compliant states and territories. However, due to widespread opposition and refusal by many state governments to implement the provisions, the deadline was extended numerous times.

On January 29, 2008, DHS issued the REAL ID regulations, specifying a gradual implementation schedule. Until May 11, 2008, states and territories would have to comply with the REAL ID Act or request an extension, valid until December 31, 2009, and they could later request an additional extension to May 11, 2011. Documents issued by states and territories that were certified as compliant or that were granted an extension would continue to be accepted, even if the documents themselves did not satisfy the standards, until December 1, 2014, for people born after December 1, 1964, or until December 1, 2017, for others. After these last deadlines, identification documents themselves would have to satisfy the standards to be accepted by federal agencies.

On March 7, 2011, DHS extended the deadline for states and territories to become compliant to January 15, 2013, but all identification documents continued to be accepted during 2013. On December 29, 2014, DHS extended the deadline for documents to satisfy the standards to October 1, 2020, regardless of age.

Enforcement based on the issuing state or territory finally began in 2014 and 2015 for accessing federal facilities and in 2018 for boarding airline flights:

- April 21, 2014: DHS headquarters at the Nebraska Avenue Complex in Washington, D.C.
- July 21, 2014: areas of federal facilities and nuclear power plants accessible only to employees, contractors, and guests
- January 19, 2015: areas of federal facilities accessible to the general public with identification, at facility security levels 1 and 2
- October 10, 2015: areas of federal facilities accessible to the general public with identification at facility security levels 3, 4, and 5, and military facilities
- January 22, 2018: boarding federally regulated commercial aircraft (airline flights)

After the deadlines, only identification documents issued by states and territories that were certified as compliant with the REAL ID Act or granted an extension were accepted. Between 2014 and 2018, some states and territories were not compliant and did not have an extension, resulting in their identification documents not being accepted for accessing federal facilities during some periods. However, from 2018 all states and territories were compliant or continuously maintained extensions, so their identification documents remained accepted for boarding airline flights.

Due to the COVID-19 pandemic, on April 27, 2020, the extended deadline after which identification documents would have to satisfy the REAL ID Act standards to be accepted by federal agencies was again extended, by one year to October 1, 2021. On May 3, 2021, it was extended to May 3, 2023; on December 5, 2022, it was extended to May 7, 2025.

On January 14, 2025, the Transportation Security Administration (TSA) maintained in principle the deadline of May 7, 2025, but allowed flexible enforcement, for example by warning holders of noncompliant documents rather than refusing them altogether, until May 5, 2027. On November 20, 2025, TSA announced that its alternative identity verification process for people without acceptable identification to access airport boarding areas would be modernized, and that a fee of US$18 would be required to use the system for 10 days. On December 1, 2025, TSA announced that the system, named ConfirmID, would begin on February 1, 2026, and increased the fee to $45.

=== State certifications ===
REAL ID Act compliance by year of DHS certification.: 2012 2013 2014 / 2016 2017 2018 / 2019 2020 2021 / 2024

DHS began certifying states as compliant in 2012. Adoption slowed after 2013 but increased significantly in 2018 and 2019, as the final phase of implementation approached and states were faced with potential air travel restrictions for their residents. DHS completed certification of all states by 2020, and of all territories by 2024.

The REAL ID Act requires that states and territories share their ID and driver history databases with each other, but this requirement was not included in the DHS certification criteria. The State-to-State (S2S) Verification Service, used to share ID databases, was implemented in 2015, and the feature used to share driver history records (DHR) was implemented in 2022. As of 2026, 47 jurisdictions were participating in S2S, and 46 in DHR.

| State or territory | REAL ID certification | S2S implementation | DHR implementation |
|---|---|---|---|
| Colorado | December 20, 2012 | January 28, 2020 | March 11, 2024 |
| Connecticut | December 20, 2012 | | |
| Delaware | December 20, 2012 | December 19, 2016 | June 10, 2024 |
| Georgia | December 20, 2012 | January 19, 2021 | September 18, 2023 |
| Indiana | December 20, 2012 | February 15, 2016 | February 20, 2024 |
| Iowa | December 20, 2012 | May 23, 2016 | by November 10, 2025 |
| Maryland | December 20, 2012 | February 1, 2016 | August 22, 2022 |
| Ohio | December 20, 2012 | April 19, 2021 | July 31, 2023 |
| South Dakota | December 20, 2012 | October 3, 2016 | March 11, 2024 |
| Tennessee | December 20, 2012 | March 5, 2018 | April 10, 2023 |
| West Virginia | December 20, 2012 | | |
| Wisconsin | December 20, 2012 | August 10, 2015 | April 11, 2022 |
| Wyoming | December 20, 2012 | November 21, 2016 | October 20, 2025 |
| Nebraska | February 15, 2013 | October 17, 2016 | February 20, 2024 |
| Alabama | by February 28, 2013 | April 25, 2022 | April 25, 2022 |
| Florida | by February 28, 2013 | January 17, 2023 | January 17, 2023 |
| Kansas | by February 28, 2013 | December 14, 2020 | June 2, 2025 |
| Utah | by February 28, 2013 | January 28, 2019 | March 13, 2023 |
| Vermont | by February 28, 2013 | November 10, 2025 | November 10, 2025 |
| Hawaii | September 9, 2013 | December 12, 2022 | May 19, 2025 |
| Mississippi | by December 20, 2013 | April 8, 2019 | April 29, 2024 |
| District of Columbia | by December 31, 2014 | September 30, 2024 | September 30, 2024 |
| Nevada | by December 31, 2014 | November 9, 2026 | November 9, 2026 |
| Arizona | by July 12, 2016 | February 27, 2017 | September 16, 2024 |
| Arkansas | by December 8, 2016 | June 6, 2016 | July 31, 2023 |
| New Mexico | December 22, 2016 | June 18, 2018 | May 13, 2024 |
| Texas | by August 10, 2017 | September 5, 2023 | September 5, 2023 |
| North Carolina | by October 12, 2017 | February 25, 2019 | June 30, 2025 |
| Louisiana | by January 23, 2018 | October 17, 2018 | September 14, 2026 |
| Michigan | by January 23, 2018 | March 15, 2021 | October 16, 2023 |
| New York | by February 23, 2018 | September 3, 2024 | February 16, 2026 |
| South Carolina | May 18, 2018 | July 25, 2022 | July 25, 2022 |
| Idaho | July 31, 2018 | August 22, 2016 | November 18, 2024 |
| North Dakota | September 10, 2018 | November 16, 2015 | May 9, 2022 |
| New Hampshire | October 1, 2018 | June 14, 2021 | August 17, 2026 |
| Puerto Rico | October 1, 2018 | | |
| Washington | October 1, 2018 | September 4, 2018 | February 18, 2025 |
| Massachusetts | November 1, 2018 | March 26, 2018 | June 27, 2022 |
| Minnesota | November 19, 2018 | September 30, 2019 | September 19, 2022 |
| Virginia | December 10, 2018 | December 5, 2016 | August 26, 2024 |
| Guam | February 8, 2019 | | |
| Illinois | March 20, 2019 | | |
| U.S. Virgin Islands | by April 4, 2019 | | |
| Alaska | by April 28, 2019 | January 30, 2017 | |
| Missouri | by April 28, 2019 | March 25, 2019 | November 12, 2024 |
| Montana | by April 28, 2019 | November 23, 2020 | November 13, 2023 |
| Rhode Island | April 30, 2019 | June 3, 2019 | March 11, 2024 |
| Pennsylvania | May 17, 2019 | May 21, 2018 | May 5, 2025 |
| California | May 22, 2019 | | |
| Kentucky | July 19, 2019 | June 8, 2026 | June 8, 2026 |
| Maine | September 13, 2019 | December 16, 2024 | December 16, 2024 |
| New Jersey | March 27, 2020 | March 25, 2024 | February 23, 2026 |
| Oregon | August 4, 2020 | July 6, 2020 | May 12, 2025 |
| Oklahoma | September 10, 2020 | February 16, 2026 | February 16, 2026 |
| N. Mariana Islands | March 26, 2021 | | |
| American Samoa | February 14, 2024 | | |

=== Document versions ===
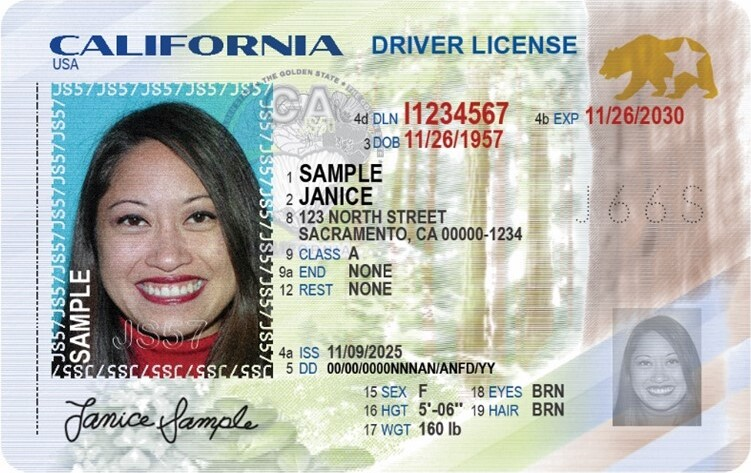
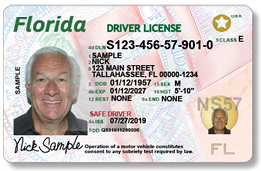
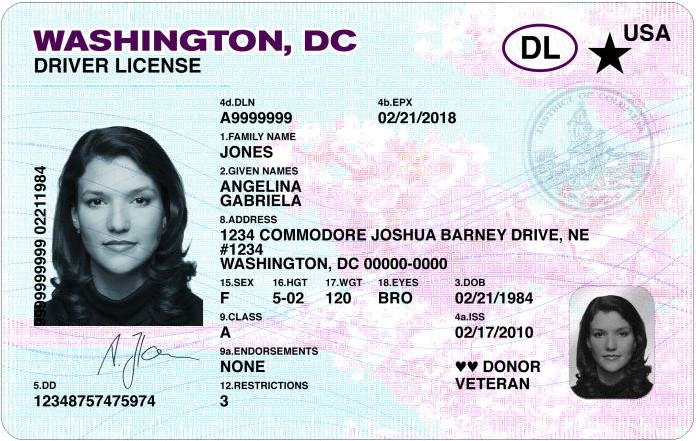
Sample driver licenses compliant with the REAL ID Act issued by California, Florida and the District of Columbia. The star symbol appears in the upper right corner.
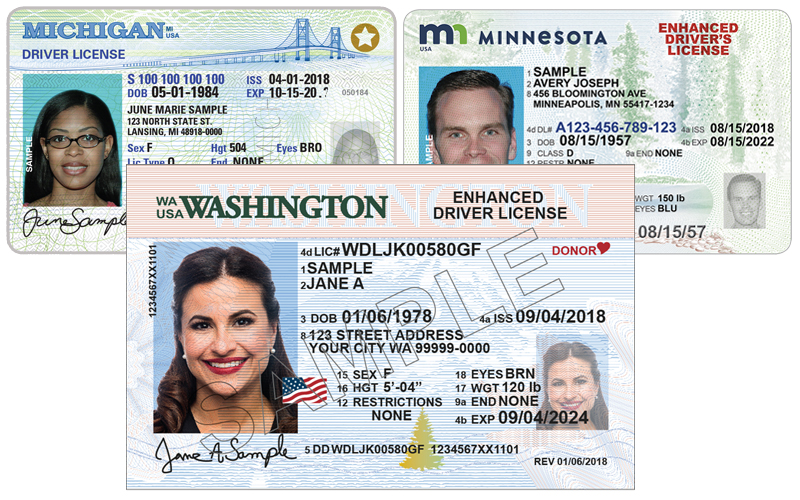
Sample enhanced driver license issued by the state of Washington. The U.S. flag appears near the photo.

Most states and territories decided to offer two versions of identification documents, one compliant with the REAL ID requirements and one not compliant. The compliant version is marked with a gold or black star, a white star in a gold or black circle, a white star in a gold bear in the case of California, a white star in a gold state map in the case of Maine, Michigan and Nevada, or a white star in a gold Old Man of the Mountain in the case of New Hampshire. The non-compliant version has a text stating that it is not valid for federal purposes, but it can still be used to drive or as local identification, so it is useful for applicants who are ineligible or do not wish to provide all documentation required for a compliant version in their jurisdiction.

Some states also offer enhanced driver licenses and enhanced identification cards, which are only available to U.S. nationals and may be used for international travel within the Americas by land or sea. They are marked with a U.S. flag and may not have a REAL ID star symbol but are also compliant with the REAL ID requirements and are accepted for federal purposes.

The state of Washington is unique in that it only offers enhanced and non-compliant versions, making its residents who are not U.S. nationals ineligible for compliant state-issued identification documents. It is also the only state that does not offer any document with a REAL ID star symbol, even though its enhanced version is compliant.

=== Documents for boarding flights ===
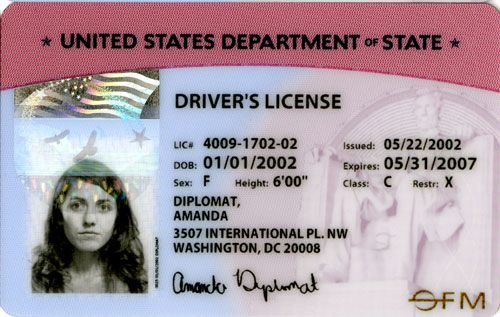
Sample diplomatic driver license issued by the U.S. Department of State

Before boarding an airline flight in the United States, passengers must pass through an airport security checkpoint operated by the Transportation Security Administration, which requires that passengers age 18 and older present an identification document whose name must match their boarding pass. Many types of documents are accepted for this purpose:

- Driver license or identification card issued by a U.S. state or territory (only if compliant with REAL ID standards)
- Enhanced driver license or enhanced identification card issued by a U.S. state
- Passport of any country or U.S. passport card
- DHS trusted traveler card (Global Entry, NEXUS, SENTRI or FAST)
- U.S. permanent resident card or employment authorization document (I-766)
- Border Crossing Card
- Driver license issued by a Canadian province or Canadian Indian Status card
- Photo identification card issued by a federally recognized tribe
- U.S. Department of Defense identification, including for dependents
- Personal Identity Verification (PIV) card for U.S. federal employees and contractors
- Transportation Worker Identification Credential or Merchant Mariner Credential
- Veteran Health Identification Card
- Driver license or identification card issued by the U.S. Department of State for foreign diplomatic and consular officers and their eligible dependents

Some digital forms of identification documents are also accepted. Identification documents are accepted up to two years after their expiration. Passengers under age 18 are not required to present identification at security checkpoints.

Passengers age 18 and older without any acceptable identification document have the option to pay US$45 to use ConfirmID, an identity verification process. If the verification is successful, they may proceed through the security checkpoint. The fee allows using this process multiple times for 10 days.

Passengers boarding an international flight may be required to present more specific documents, such as a passport or visa, to the airline during check-in and after arrival at their destination, but they may still present any of the acceptable documents at the security checkpoint.

== Criticism ==
The Bush administration's REAL ID Act was strongly supported by the conservative Heritage Foundation and other opponents of illegal immigration. However, it faced criticism from across the political spectrum, including from libertarian groups, like the Cato Institute; immigrant advocacy groups; human and civil rights organizations, like the ACLU; Christian advocacy groups, such as the American Center for Law & Justice (ACLJ); privacy advocacy groups, like the 511 campaign; state-level opposition groups, such as North Carolinians Against REAL ID and government accountability groups in Florida; labor groups, like AFL–CIO; People for the American Way; consumer and patient protection groups; some gun rights groups, such as Gun Owners of America; many state lawmakers, state legislatures, and governors; the Constitution Party; and the editorial page of The Wall Street Journal, among others.

Highlighting the broad diversity of the coalition opposing Title II of the REAL ID Act, the American Center for Law and Justice (ACLJ), founded by evangelical Christian Pat Robertson, participated in a joint press conference with the ACLU in 2008.

Among the 2008 presidential candidates, John McCain strongly supported the REAL ID Act, but Hillary Clinton called for it to be reviewed, Barack Obama and Ron Paul flatly opposed it, and Mike Huckabee called it "a huge mistake." The subsequent Obama administration opposed it.

In 2008, Cindy Southworth, technology project director for the National Network to End Domestic Violence, noted a "conundrum" in the mission "to identify people who are dangerous, such as terrorists, and at the same time, [...] in a way that keeps everyday citizens and victims safe." The National Coalition Against Domestic Violence also voiced concern about the REAL ID Act.

Adrian Wyllie, the then-chair of the Libertarian Party of Florida, drove without carrying a driver license in 2011 in protest of the REAL ID Act. After being ticketed, Wyllie argued in court that Florida's identification laws violated his privacy rights; a judge rejected this claim.

=== Congress ===
The House of Representatives approved the original REAL ID Act, H.R.418, on February 10, 2005, by a vote of 261–161. At the insistence of the bill's sponsor and then House Judiciary Committee Chair Jim Sensenbrenner, the REAL ID Act was subsequently attached by the House Republican leadership as a rider to H.R.1268, a bill dealing with emergency appropriations for the Iraq War and with the 2004 tsunami relief funding, which was widely regarded as a must pass bill. The Senate passed H.R.1268 on April 21, 2005, without the REAL ID Act. However, the REAL ID Act was reinserted in the conference report on H.R.1268, which was then passed by the House on May 5, 2005, by a 368–58 vote and unanimously by the Senate on May 10, 2005. The Senate never discussed or voted on the REAL ID Act specifically and no Senate committee hearings were conducted on the REAL ID Act prior to its passage. Critics charged that this procedure was undemocratic and that the bill's proponents avoided a substantive debate on a far-reaching piece of legislation by attaching it to a "must-pass" bill.

A May 3, 2005, statement by the American Immigration Lawyers Association said: "Because Congress held no hearings or meaningful debate on the legislation and amended it to a must-pass spending bill, the REAL ID Act did not receive the scrutiny necessary for most measures, and most certainly not the level required for a measure of this importance and impact. Consistent with the lack of debate and discussion, conference negotiations also were held behind closed doors, with Democrats prevented from participating."

On February 28, 2007, Senator Daniel Akaka (D-HI) introduced the Identification Security Enhancement Act of 2007 to repeal the REAL ID Act and restore the equivalent provisions of the Intelligence Reform and Terrorism Prevention Act, which provided more regulatory flexibility with state participation. Seven Democratic and Republican senators cosponsored the bill. Committee hearings were held, but the bill did not advance.

A similar bill was introduced on February 16, 2007, by Representative Tom Allen (D-ME), with 41 cosponsors, all Democrats. This bill did not advance either.

A more limited bill, introduced on February 13, 2007, by Senator Susan Collins (R-ME), with four cosponsors, would have extended the deadlines for states to comply with the REAL ID Act.

On June 15, 2009, Senator Daniel Akaka introduced the PASS ID Act, which would replace the REAL ID Act with a similar law without some of the requirements that were considered excessive, such as the obligation to verify documents with the issuing authority and shared databases. The bill passed the Committee on Homeland Security and Governmental Affairs but did not advance further.

=== State legislatures ===
Many state legislatures strongly opposed the REAL ID Act, before the states eventually complied with it years later.

On January 25, 2007, the Maine Legislature overwhelmingly passed a resolution refusing to implement the REAL ID Act in that state and calling on Congress to repeal the law. Many Maine lawmakers believed that the law would do more harm than good, they were concerned that it would create bureaucratic problems, threaten individual privacy, could make citizens more vulnerable to ID theft, and would cost Maine taxpayers at least $185 million in five years to implement all aspects of the bill. The resolution vote in the Maine House of Representatives was 137–4 and in the Maine Senate unanimous, 34–0.

On February 16, 2007, the Utah legislature unanimously passed a resolution opposing the REAL ID Act. The resolution stated that REAL ID was "in opposition to the Jeffersonian principles of individual liberty, free markets, and limited government", and that "the use of identification-based security cannot be justified as part of a 'layered' security system if the costs of the identification 'layer'—in dollars, lost privacy, and lost liberty—are greater than the security identification provides".

Alaska, Arizona, Arkansas, Colorado, Georgia, Hawaii, Idaho, Illinois, Louisiana, Michigan, Minnesota, Missouri, Montana, Nebraska, Nevada, New Hampshire, North Dakota, Oklahoma, Pennsylvania, South Carolina, Tennessee, Virginia, and Washington joined Maine and Utah in passing legislation opposing the REAL ID Act. Similar resolutions were introduced in the District of Columbia, Kentucky, Louisiana, Maryland, Massachusetts, New York, Ohio, Oregon, Rhode Island, Texas, Vermont, West Virginia, Wisconsin, and Wyoming.

On April 16, 2009, the Missouri House of Representatives passed a bill prohibiting the state from complying with the REAL ID Act, by a vote of 83–69 and 3 present. On May 13, 2009, the Missouri Senate unanimously passed the bill 43–0. Missouri Governor Jay Nixon signed this bill into law on July 13, 2009. This law was later repealed in 2017. Alaska also repealed its anti-Real-ID law in 2017.

In the 2012 Florida Legislative Session, the anti-Real-ID bill HB 109 and its Senate companion S 220 were introduced. Named the Florida Driver's License Citizen Protection Act, it would require discontinuation of several of the federally mandated provisions of the REAL ID Act and destruction of copies of U.S. citizens' documents from the government database. That bill died in the Transportation and Highway Safety Subcommittee on March 9, 2012.

=== Constitutionality ===
Some critics claimed that the REAL ID Act violated the Tenth Amendment to the United States Constitution as a federal legislation in an area that, under the terms of the Tenth Amendment, was the province of the states. Anthony Romero, the executive director of the ACLU, stated: "REAL ID is an unfunded mandate that violates the Constitution's 10th Amendment on state powers, destroys states' dual sovereignty and consolidates every American's private information, leaving all of us far more vulnerable to identity thieves".

Former Republican Representative Bob Barr wrote in a February 2008 article: "A person not possessing a REAL ID Act-compliant identification card could not enter any federal building, or an office of his or her congressman or senator or the U.S. Capitol. This effectively denies that person their fundamental rights to assembly and to petition the government as guaranteed in the First Amendment".

The DHS's final rule regarding the implementation of the REAL ID Act discussed several constitutional concerns raised by the commenters on the proposed version of this rule. The DHS explicitly rejected the assertion that the implementation of the REAL ID Act would lead to violations of the citizens' individual constitutional rights. Concerning the Tenth Amendment argument about the violation of states' constitutional rights, the DHS rule acknowledged that these concerns had been raised by several individual commenters and in the comments by some states. The DHS rule did not attempt to rebuff the Tenth Amendment argument directly, but said that the DHS was acting in accordance with the authority granted to it by the REAL ID Act and that DHS had been and would be working closely with the states on the implementation of the REAL ID Act.

On November 1, 2007, attorneys for Defenders of Wildlife and the Sierra Club filed an amended complaint in U.S. District Court challenging the REAL ID Act. The amended complaint alleged that this unprecedented authority violated the fundamental separation of powers principles enshrined in the U.S. Constitution. On December 18, 2007, Judge Ellen Segal Huvelle rejected the challenge. On March 17, 2008, the attorneys filed a petition for a writ of certiorari with the U.S. Supreme Court to hear their "constitutional challenge to the secretary's decision waiving nineteen federal laws, and all state and local legal requirements related to them, in connection with the construction of a barrier along a portion of the border with Mexico". They questioned whether the preclusion of judicial review amounted to an unconstitutional delegation of legislative power and whether the "grant of waiver authority violates Article I's requirement that a duly-enacted law may be repealed only by legislation approved by both Houses of Congress and presented to the President". On April 17, 2008, numerous amicus briefs "supporting the petition were filed on behalf of 14 members of Congress, a diverse coalition of conservation, religious and Native American organizations, and 28 law professors and constitutional scholars". The Supreme Court denied the petition on June 23, 2008.

=== National ID card ===
There was disagreement about whether the REAL ID Act instituted a "national identification card" system. The new law only set forth national standards, but left the issuance of cards and the maintenance of databases in state hands; therefore, the Department of Homeland Security claimed that it was not a "national ID" system. Websites such as no2realid.org, unrealid.com, and realnightmare.org argued that this was a trivial distinction, and that the new cards were in fact national ID cards, due to the uniform national standards, the linked databases created by AAMVA, and the requirement of such identification for domestic air travel.

Many advocacy groups and individual opponents of the REAL ID Act believed that having a REAL ID-compliant identification might become a requirement for various basic tasks. A January 2008 statement by the ACLU of Maryland said: "The law places no limits on potential required uses for Real IDs. In time, Real IDs could be required to vote, collect a Social Security check, access Medicaid, open a bank account, go to an Orioles game, or buy a gun. The private sector could begin mandating a REAL ID to perform countless commercial and financial activities, such as renting a DVD or buying car insurance. REAL ID cards would become a necessity, making them de facto national IDs". However, government-issued identification was already required to perform some of these tasks; for example, two forms of identification – usually a driver license, passport, or Social Security card – were required by the Patriot Act in order to open a bank account.

=== Privacy ===
Many privacy rights advocates charged that by creating a national system electronically storing vast amounts of detailed personal data about individuals, the REAL ID Act increased the chance of such data being stolen and thus raised the risk of identity theft. The Bush administration, in the DHS final rule regarding the REAL ID Act implementation, countered that the security precautions regarding handling sensitive personal data and hiring workers for this task, which were specified in the REAL ID Act and in the rule, provided sufficient protections against unauthorized use and theft of such personal data.

Another privacy concern raised by privacy advocates such as the Electronic Frontier Foundation was that the implementation of the REAL ID Act would make it substantially easier for the government to track numerous activities of Americans and conduct surveillance. Supporters of the REAL ID Act, such as the conservative think-tank Heritage Foundation, dismissed this criticism under the grounds that states would be permitted by law to share data only when validating someone's identity.

The Data Privacy and Integrity Advisory Committee, which was established to advise the Department of Homeland Security on privacy-related issues, released a statement regarding the Department of Homeland Security's proposed rules for the standardization of state driver licenses on May 7, 2007. The committee stated that "Given that these issues have not received adequate consideration, the Committee feels it is important that the following comments do not constitute an endorsement of REAL ID or the regulations as workable or appropriate", and "The issues pose serious risks to an individual's privacy and, without amelioration, could undermine the stated goals of the REAL ID Act".

=== Gender ===
The REAL ID Act requires that states and territories include an individual's gender on each driver license and identification card issued. As of 2022, all states and territories allowed individuals to change their gender on identification documents to either male or female, and many states also offered the option of gender-neutral marker X. The requirements for changing the recorded gender varied by jurisdiction, from merely a personal request to additional documentation such as a court order or proof of surgery.

Some scholars criticized the inclusion of gender markers in identification documents, pointing to the ineffectiveness of gender in confirming a person's identity or due to privacy concerns of transgender individuals.

=== Asylum and deportation ===
Many immigrant and civil rights advocates felt that the changes related to evidentiary standards and the immigration officers' discretion in asylum cases, contained in the REAL ID Act, would prevent many legitimate asylum seekers from obtaining asylum. For example, scholars pointed to how the REAL ID Act placed more emphasis on applicant account discrepancies to determine asylum seekers as "incredible" and discretion on additional corroboration requirements, which discounted potential trauma-related psychological and other barriers related to persecution that might affect testimony accounts. Additionally, a 2005 article in LCCR-sponsored Civil Rights Monitor stated, "The bill also contained changes to asylum standards, which according to LCCR, would prevent many legitimate asylum seekers from obtaining safe haven in the United States. These changes gave immigration officials broad discretion to demand certain evidence to support an asylum claim, with little regard to whether the evidence can realistically be obtained; as well as the discretion to deny claims based on such subjective factors as 'demeanor'. Critics said the reason for putting such asylum restrictions into what was being sold as an anti-terrorism bill was unclear, given that suspected terrorists are already barred from obtaining asylum or any other immigration benefit".

Similarly, some immigration and human rights advocacy groups maintained that the REAL ID Act provided an overly broad definition of "terrorist activity" that would prevent some deserving categories of applicants from gaining asylum or refugee status in the United States. A November 2007 report by Human Rights Watch raised this criticism specifically in relation to former child soldiers who had been forcibly and illegally recruited to participate in an armed group.

=== Environment ===
In 2020, the section of the REAL ID Act waiving laws that could interfere with the construction of the border barrier negatively impacted the natural and cultural environment of the border area. One example was at Quitobaquito Springs in the Organ Pipe Cactus National Monument in Arizona, one of the only reliable above-ground water sources in the Sonoran Desert and home to the endangered Sonoyta pupfish and Sonora mud turtle. The spring and surrounding lands are also sacred to the Hia C-eḍ Oʼodham and Tohono Oʼodham peoples. Due to the construction of the border barrier, the flow of water declined precipitously from March 2020, and threatened the cultural landscape as well as the two endangered species, along with other desert animals and plants that relied on the water.

== See also ==
- Coalition for a Secure Driver's License
- Identity document
- Internal passport
- Internal passport of Russia
- Registered Traveler
- Safeguard American Voter Eligibility Act (SAVE Act), proposed law
- Secure Fence Act of 2006
- United States passport
- United States Passport Card
- Western Hemisphere Travel Initiative
