= Visa requirements for United States citizens =

Visa requirements for United States citizens are administrative entry restrictions by the authorities of other states that are imposed on citizens of the United States. As of 2026, holders of a United States passport may travel to 180 countries and territories without a travel visa, or with a visa on arrival. The United States passport ranks (Note: Using dense ranking.) 9th in terms of travel freedom, according to the Henley Passport Index. It is also ranked 9th by the Global Passport Power Rank.

== Visa requirements map ==
Visa requirements for United States citizens holding ordinary passports United States and its territories Freedom of Movement Visa not required / ETA (Note: ETA required for Australia, Israel, Kenya, Mozambique, New Zealand, Saint Kitts and Nevis, Seychelles and the United Kingdom) Visa available both on arrival or online Visa on arrival eVisa Visa required Travel restricted (either by local law or US regulations) or admission refused

== Visa requirements ==
General visa requirements of sovereign countries towards United States citizens:

Country / Region	Visa requirement	Allowed stay	Notes (excluding departure fees)	Reciprocity
Afghanistan	eVisa	30 days	e-Visa : Visitors must arrive at Kabul International (KBL).; Visitors born in Afghanistan do not require a visa.; All visitors are required to register with the Ministry of Foreign Affairs upon arrival.; The U.S. government forced all Afghan diplomatic missions in the U.S. to close in March 2022. Applicants must now obtain a visa from a mission in another country, unless applying for a visitor eVisa online.; Since 2024, the Taliban only accepts visas issued by approved diplomatic missions, though those who have already entered on a visa issued by another mission are allowed to stay.; The U.S. government advises its citizens not to visit Afghanistan due to civil unrest, crime, terrorism, risk of wrongful detention, kidnapping, and limited health facilities. U.S. citizens in Afghanistan are urged to depart immediately via commercial means if possible.	No
Albania	Visa not required	1 year	One must leave for 90 days to reset the visa-free period.	No
Algeria	Visa required		Application for a tourist visa to Algeria must be accompanied by a certificate of accommodation.; Persons may be denied entry if entering with a passport containing visas or stamps issued by Israel.; Persons may be denied entry if entering with a passport containing visas or stamps issued by Israel.; Visitors on tours organized to some southern regions by an approved travel agency may obtain a visa on arrival for up to 30 days.	Yes
Andorra	Visa not required	3 months		Yes
Angola	Visa not required	30 days	30 days per trip, but no more than 90 days within any 1 calendar year for tourism purposes only.; Visitors must have a return/onward ticket and a hotel reservation confirmation.; An International Certificate of Vaccination is required.	No
Antigua and Barbuda	Visa not required	6 months	Stringent application of rules regarding proof of sufficient funds, return ticket and accommodation.	No
Argentina	Visa not required	90 days	Extendable up to 180 days.; Argentina requires travelers to have health insurance prior to the arrival as of July 2025.	No
Armenia	Visa not required	180 days		No
Australia	Electronic Travel Authority	90 days	eTA fee is AUD$20; 90 days on each visit in 12-month period if granted.; May enter using SmartGate.	Yes
Austria	Visa not required	90 days	90 days within any 180-day period in the Schengen Area.; Residence permit (Aufenthaltstitel) for stays of longer than 90 days obtainable after arrival under certain conditions.	Yes
Azerbaijan	eVisa	30 days	Visitors departing from New York can obtain a visa at the airport upon arrival in Baku, however no airline currently operates this route. Visa can be obtained on arrival in certain emergency situations.; If staying in Azerbaijan for more than ten days, visitors must register at the State Migration Service within three days of arrival.; Applicants of Armenian ancestry or with Armenian visas in their passport may be denied a visa.; Travellers with a visa or evidence of travel to the now-defunct Republic of Artsakh (stamps) are permanently denied entry.	No
The Bahamas	Visa not required	8 months	Passport card or enhanced drivers license valid for sea travel.	No
Bahrain	eVisa / Visa on arrival	14 days		No
Bangladesh	Visa on arrival	30 days	Visa on arrival is available at Dhaka, Chittagong, and Sylhet international airports, pre arrival visa required if arriving by sea or by land border crossing.; No visa required for Bangladeshi Americans and their spouse and children with a copy of a former Bangladeshi passport, a Dual Nationality Certificate, NVR, a Bangladeshi NID, or a digital birth registration certificate.; The VOA fee is 50 USD, excluding processing fees.	No
Barbados	Visa not required	6 months		No
Belarus	eVisa	30 days	The U.S. government advises its citizens not to visit Belarus due to the Belarusian authorities’ arbitrary enforcement of local laws, the risk of detention, the continued facilitation of Russia’s war against Ukraine, the potential of civil unrest, and the Embassy’s limited ability to assist U.S. citizens residing in or traveling to Belarus. U.S. citizens in Belarus are advised to depart immediately.	No
Belgium	Visa not required	90 days	90 days within any 180-day period in the Schengen Area; Residence permit (Titre de séjour/Verblijfstitel/Aufenthaltstitel) obtainable after arrival for stays longer than 90 days under certain conditions.	Yes
Belize	Visa not required	180 days	Mandatory Car Disinfection at border. If one fails to do so, they will be sent back to go through this procedure. A fee does apply.	No
Benin	eVisa	30 days	International Certificate of Vaccination or Prophylaxis required.; Three types of electronic visa are offered: the e-Visa valid for 30 days for a single entry (50 EUR), the e-Visa valid for 30 days for several (multiple) entries (75 EUR), and the e-Visa valid for 90 days to make several (multiple) entries (100 EUR).	No
Bhutan	eVisa	90 days	The Sustainable Development Fee (SDF) of 200 USD per person, per night for almost all visitors to Bhutan. Additionally, if payment is made in US dollars from September 1, 2023 to August 31, 2027, the SDF is 100 USD.; Tour guide required for all travelers except in city of Thimpu and Paro. Even in these cities, tourists are not permitted to enter any tourist attraction without a guide. They are only allowed to walk and shop around these cities without a guide.	No
Bolivia	Visa not required	90 days		No
Bosnia and Herzegovina	Visa not required	90 days	90 days within any 6-month period.	No
Botswana	Visa not required	90 days	90 days within any 1-year period.	No
Brazil	eVisa	90 days	Brazilian authorities have announced that United States citizens will require a visa beginning April 10, 2025. United States citizens will be able to obtain visas online.	No
Brunei	Visa not required	90 days		Yes
Bulgaria	Visa not required	90 days	90 days within any 180-day period in the Schengen Area.	No
Burkina Faso	Admission refused		International Certificate of Vaccination or Prophylaxis required.; The U.S. government advises its citizens not to visit Burkina Faso for any reason due to terrorism, crime, and kidnapping.; Following Niger's example, Burkina Faso has suspended visa services for U.S. citizens and barred Americans from entering.	Yes
Burundi	Online Visa / Visa on arrival	1 month	Visa on arrival obtainable at Bujumbura International Airport, and all land borders.	No
Cambodia	eVisa / Visa on arrival	30 days	Visa is also obtainable online.	No
Cameroon	eVisa		International Certificate of Vaccination or Prophylaxis and current immunization records required.	No
Canada	Visa not required	6 months	Anyone with a criminal record (including misdemeanors or alcohol-related driving offenses in the US) may not be able to enter Canada without first obtaining an approval for rehabilitation or a Temporary Resident Permit (TRP).; Passport Card, NEXUS card, or enhanced drivers license valid for land and sea travel.; United States citizens and permanent residents are exempt from obtaining Canada ETA.	Yes
Cape Verde	Visa not required (EASE)	30 days	Must register online at least five days prior to arrival.; Visitors must pay the Airport Security Fee (TSA) before visiting. The cost is 3,400 CVE (approx. 31 EUR) and can be paid via the online platform (EASE).	No
Central African Republic	Visa required		International Certificate of Vaccination or Prophylaxis required.; The U.S. government advises its citizens not to visit Central African Republic (CAR) due to armed conflict, crime, civil unrest, and kidnapping, as well as Embassy Bangui’s limited capacity to provide support to U.S. citizens.	Yes
Chad	Visa Issuance Suspended		On June 5, 2025, Chad suspended visa issuances to U.S. citizens in response to Donald Trump's travel ban; visas issued on or prior to June 5, 2025 will still be honored until their expiration.; Dual-citizens of Chad can still travel to Chad but can only travel with a valid Chad passport.; Passengers with an entry authorisation issued by the authorities of Chad can obtain a visa on arrival.; International Certificate of Vaccination or Prophylaxis required only if arriving from a high risk country as defined by the WHO.; Registration within 72 hours is mandatory prior to arrival.	Yes
Chile	Visa not required	90 days	No reciprocity fees required.	Yes
China	Visa required		This entry is about formal laws. A China visa travel guide from Wikivoyage is available for more practical guidance.: 30-day visa‑free entry to Hainan Province if arriving at the island from outside Mainland China.; 240-hour (10-day) visa-free transit to a third country or region (including Hong Kong, Macau or Taiwan) using any mode of transport. Must have a confirmed onward ticket/itinerary, and enter through 1 of 64 approved ports.; During which, may freely travel within the 24 provinces permitted for visa-free transit and engage in tourism, business, and visits.; 24-hour visa-free transit to a third country or region (including Hong Kong, Macau, and Taiwan), is available at most international airports, without leaving the airport.; Travellers who need to leave the airport may obtain a temporary entry permit from immigration.; 5-day port visa (Visa on Arrival) for Shenzhen if arriving at designated ports of entry from Hong Kong by land or sea, for stays within Shenzhen.; 3-day port visa (Visa on Arrival) if arriving in Zhuhai or Xiamen at designated ports of entry, for stays within the respective city.; 15-day visa-free entry for cruise ship passengers in tour groups, if arriving at any cruise port along China's coastline, including but not limited to Tianjin; Dalian; Shanghai; Lianyungang; Wenzhou; Zhoushan; Xiamen; Qingdao; Guangzhou; Shenzhen; Beihai; Haikou; Sanya. May further travel inland to all regions of coastal provinces (and equivalents) and Beijing.; May apply for a port visa (Visa on Arrival) if travelling for an urgent, qualified reason. Prior clearance for port visa is highly recommended or may be denied boarding by airlines.; Visas for U.S. citizens are valid for up to 10 years.; U.S. citizens arriving via cruise ports as part of tour groups are visa exempt for stays of up to 15 days.	Yes
Colombia	Visa not required	90 days	Extendable up to 180-days stay within a one-year period; Colombian-born U.S. citizens and U.S. citizens traveling with children may face special exit requirements.	No
Comoros	Visa on arrival	45 days		No
Republic of the Congo	Visa required		International Certificate of Vaccination or Prophylaxis required.; In April 2019 Congolese authorities announced a plan to introduce an electronic visa in August 2019. Visa applications can already be submitted online at the Republic of the Congo embassy in France website.	Yes
Democratic Republic of the Congo	eVisa	7 days	International Certificate of Vaccination or Prophylaxis required.; Registration required.	No
Costa Rica	Visa not required	90 days	90 days out of any 12-month period.	No
Côte d'Ivoire	eVisa	3 months	e-Visa holders must arrive via Port Bouet Airport.; International Certificate of Vaccination or Prophylaxis required.	No
Croatia	Visa not required	90 days	90 days within any 180-day period in the Schengen Area.	Yes
Cuba	eVisa	90 days	Tourist travel is prohibited under U.S. law for U.S. citizens, permanent residents, and others subject to U.S. jurisdiction. Under the Cuban Assets Control Regulations, all persons subject to U.S. jurisdiction are not permitted to travel to Cuba unless licensed to engage in travel-related transactions. In addition to specific licenses granted by the Office of Foreign Assets Control (OFAC), there are 12 "general licenses" that people can choose to travel on without being required to notify OFAC, (Note: The general licenses are: Family visits; Official business of the U.S. government, foreign governments, and certain intergovernmental organizations; Journalistic activity; Professional research and professional meetings; Educational activities; Religious activities; Public performances, clinics, workshops, athletic and other competitions, and exhibitions; Support for the Cuban people; Humanitarian projects; Activities of private foundations or research or educational institutes; Exportation, importation, or transmission of information or informational materials; Certain export transactions that may be considered for authorization under existing Department of Commerce regulations and guidelines with respect to Cuba or engaged in by U.S.-owned or -controlled foreign firms; To use a general license, travelers are required only to attest to one on a form provided by the airline, and only when traveling on a flight directly from the U.S. They are expected to maintain a full-time schedule consistent with the terms of the general license, and to only make transactions related to this purpose. Airlines and travelers are required to maintain records of all Cuba-related transactions for at least five years.) and the broad and self-reported nature of these licenses means travel is in practice subject to few restrictions.; Cuba requires travelers to purchase a tourist card prior to arrival, which can be obtained from the airline or a Cuban diplomatic mission. Tourist cards are valid for one entry and a 30-day stay, which can be extended once by 90 days at a hotel or immigration office in Cuba.; Cuba requires travelers to have health insurance valid in Cuba, which can be purchased from the airline.	No
Cyprus	Visa not required	90 days	90 days within any 180-day period.	No
Czech Republic	Visa not required	90 days	90 days within any 180-day period in the Schengen Area.	Yes
Denmark	Visa not required	90 days	U.S. citizens can enter Denmark for up to 90 days out of any 180 day period, regardless of time spent in other Schengen countries prior to entry into Denmark.	Yes
Djibouti	eVisa	90 days	e-Visas valid at any port of entry.	No
Dominica	Visa not required	6 months		No
Dominican Republic	Visa not required	30 days	Extendable up to 90 days.; Passport card or enhanced drivers license valid for sea travel.	No
Ecuador	Visa not required	90 days	Extendable for another 90 days, per year	No
Egypt	eVisa / Visa on arrival	30 days	e-Visa issued for 30 days.; Visa-free travel for tourists arriving at Sharm El Sheikh, St. Catherine, or Taba airports and remaining in the Sinai resorts up to 15 days.	No
El Salvador	Visa not required	180 days	Part of the Central America-4 Free Mobility Agreement. One ninety-day extension may be granted if applied five days before the first expires.; In the CA4 area, one gets 90 days total for the entire area. To reset one's stay, they must leave the area.	No
Equatorial Guinea	eVisa		International Certificate of Vaccination or Prophylaxis required if one is traveling from a country with risk of yellow fever.	No
Eritrea	Visa required		Permit required to leave capital.	Yes
Estonia	Visa not required	90 days	90 days within any 180-day period in the Schengen Area	Yes
Eswatini	Visa not required	30 days	Extendable up to 60 days.	No
Ethiopia	eVisa / Visa on arrival	90 days	Visa on arrival is obtainable only at Addis Ababa Bole International Airport.; e-Visa holders must arrive via Addis Ababa Bole International Airport.; e-Visa is available for 30 or 90 days.	No
Fiji	Visa not required	4 months		No
Finland	Visa not required	90 days	90 days within any 180-day period in the Schengen Area	Yes
France	Visa not required	90 days	90 days within any 180-day period in the Schengen Area (in Regions of France); A bilateral agreement pre-dating the Schengen area may allow 90 days of stay in France regardless of days spent in other Schengen countries.	Yes
Gabon	Visa Issuance Suspended	90 days	US Embassy in Libreville announced that effective January 1, 2026, Gabon has issued a reciprocal visa ban for U.S. Citizens.; e-Visas are available for one to six months.; e-Visa holders must arrive via Libreville International Airport.; International Certificate of Vaccination or Prophylaxis required.; Embassy visas are valid for 5 years and multiple entries for US citizens	Yes
Gambia	Visa on arrival	30 days	International Certificate of Vaccination or Prophylaxis required only for travellers arriving high risk countries and having transited for more than 12 hours	No
Georgia	Visa not required	1 year		No
Germany	Visa not required	90 days	90 days within any 180-day period in the Schengen Area; Residence permit (Aufenthaltstitel) for stays of longer than 90 days obtainable after arrival under certain conditions.; Germany requires that all passports be signed.	Yes
Ghana	eVisa		Pre approved visa can be obtained on arrival.; International Certificate of Vaccination or Prophylaxis required.; Visas for US citizens are either single entry or multiple entry and valid for 5 years. The fee for single entry 3 month validity is 60 USD and the fee for the multiple entry visa is 100 USD.	Yes
Greece	Visa not required	90 days	90 days within any 180-day period in the Schengen Area	Yes
Grenada	Visa not required	3 months		No
Guatemala	Visa not required	90 days	Part of the Central America-4 Free Mobility Agreement.; In the CA4 area, one gets 90 days total for the entire area. To reset one's stay, they must leave the area.	No
Guinea	eVisa	90 days	International Certificate of Vaccination or Prophylaxis required.	No
Guinea-Bissau	Visa on arrival	90 days		No
Guyana	Visa not required	30 days		No
Haiti	Visa not required	3 months	Travel currently almost impossible due to gang violence. Only open borders are the sea borders. Air borders are currently not open, nor is the border with the Dominican Republic.; Foreign visitors are required to pay a US$10 Tourist visa fee.; The U.S. government advises its citizens not to visit Haiti due to kidnapping, crime, terrorist activity, civil unrest, and limited health care.	No
Honduras	Visa not required	3 months	Part of the Central America-4 Free Mobility Agreement.; In the CA4 area, one gets 90 days total for the entire area. To reset one's stay, they must leave the area.	No
Hungary	Visa not required	90 days	90 days within any 180-day period in the Schengen Area	Yes
Iceland	Visa not required	90 days	90 days within any 180-day period in the Schengen Area	Yes
India	eVisa	30 days	e-Visa holders must arrive via 32 designated airports (Note: Ahmedabad; Amritsar; Bagdogra; Bengaluru; Bhubaneswar; Chandigarh; Chennai; Coimbatore; Delhi; Gaya; Goa-Dabolim; Goa-Manohar; Guwahati; Hyderabad; Indore; Jaipur; Kannur; Kochi; Kolkata; Kozhikode; Lucknow; Madurai; Mangaluru; Mumbai; Nagpur; Port Blair; Pune; Surat; Thiruvananthapuram; Tiruchirappalli; Varanasi; Visakhapatnam) or 5 designated seaports. (Note: Chennai; Cochin; Mormugao; Mumbai; Mangalore); An Indian e-Tourist Visa may only be obtained twice within 1 calendar year.; Foreigners of Pakistani origin or who hold a Pakistani Passport are not eligible for an e-Visa. Foreigners who are not Pakistani nationals, but whose parents or grandparents (either paternal or maternal) were born in, or were permanent residents in Pakistan, are also not eligible for an e-Visa.; American citizens are also eligible for a ten-year, multiple-entry tourist visa.; American citizens of Pakistani heritage are not eligible for an eVisa nor are they eligible for a ten-year, multiple-entry tourist visa, and must apply for a regular visa.	No
Indonesia	e-VOA / Visa on arrival	30 days	Can be bought for IDR 500.000 (approx. US$35).	No
Iran	Visa required		Iranian visas must be obtained from the Iranian Interests section of the Embassy of Pakistan, Washington, D.C. or an Iranian embassy in a third country.; Independent travelers must be accompanied by an authorized guide at all times.; Admission refused if passport contains stamps or visas issued by Israel.; The U.S. government advises its citizens not to visit Iran due to the risk of terrorism, civil unrest, kidnapping, arbitrary arrest of U.S. citizens, and wrongful detention.	Yes
Iraq	eVisa	30 days	Authorities in Iraq have decided to remove the visa-on-arrival requirement for nationals of the European Union and several other countries, requiring them to now apply for an e-visa to enter Iraq through the official platform.; The U.S. government advises its citizens not to visit Iraq for any reason due to terrorism, kidnapping, armed conflict, civil unrest, and the U.S. government’s limited ability to provide emergency services to U.S. citizens in Iraq.	No
Ireland	Visa not required	3 months	Residence permit for stays of longer than 90 days obtainable after arrival under certain conditions.	Yes
Israel	Electronic Travel Authorization	90 days	ETA-IL fee is 25 NIS; 90 days on each visit in 2-year period if granted.; Dual nationals of Israel and the United States who don't have an Israeli passport, including infants, may be required to obtain an Israeli passport in order to leave Israel.; Entry prohibited for any person "who knowingly issues a public call for boycotting Israel".	Yes
Italy	Visa not required	90 days	90 days within any 180-day period in the Schengen Area; A bilateral agreement pre-dating the Schengen area may allow 90 days of stay in Italy regardless of days spent in other Schengen countries.	Yes
Jamaica	Visa not required	6 months	Departure tax collected by airline for all arrivals by air.	No
Japan	Visa not required	90 days	Persons who have been sentenced to 1 year or more of jail are not eligible for visa free travel to Japan. United States citizens are also eligible for a Japanese eVisa.	Yes
Jordan	eVisa / Visa on arrival		Visa can be obtained upon arrival.; Not available at King Hussein/Allenby Bridge; Crossing via any border with Israel may cause issues when entering some countries.; Visa fee can be waived with Jordan Pass and three night hotel stay.	No
Kazakhstan	Visa not required	30 days	Visa free was granted in 2014 under the unilateral visa waiver for countries with high investment in the Kazakhstan economy.	No
Kenya	Electronic Travel Authorisation	90 days	Applications can be submitted up to 90 days prior to travel and must be submitted at least 3 days in advance.; eTA fee is 32.50 USD.; Proof of reservation at the hotel where visitors plan to stay is required (if staying with friends, an invitation letter is also acceptable).; Yellow fever vaccination certificate is required if coming from endemic countries.	No
Kiribati	Visa not required	90 days	May not exceed 90 days within any 12-month period.	No
North Korea	Travel restricted by U.S. government/Admission refused for U.S. citizens with foreign nationality		U.S. passports holders must obtain a special passport validation from the U.S. federal government before travel. Such validations are only ever issued if travel is in the interests of US national security.; United States citizens require a visa when traveling to North Korea; as there is no North Korean diplomatic mission in the United States, US citizens must obtain a visa from a diplomatic mission in a third country.; U.S. secretary of state Rex Tillerson authorized a ban on American travel to North Korea that went into effect in August 2017, following the death of Otto Warmbier, a US student who was detained in North Korea and sentenced to 15 years of hard labor for allegedly stealing a propaganda poster.; The U.S. government advises its citizens not to visit North Korea for any reason due to the continuing serious risk of arrest, long-term detention, and the threat of wrongful detention of U.S. nationals.	Yes
South Korea	Visa not required	90 days	From September 2021, travelers require the Korean Electronic Travel Authorization (K-ETA). The validity period is 3 years from the date of approval.; The government of the Republic of Korea announced that from April 1, 2023, to December 31, 2026, a K-ETA is not required for 27 countries citizens visiting Korea for 90 days or less for business or tourism.	Yes
Kuwait	eVisa / Visa on arrival	3 months	Visa fee is 10 KWD.	No
Kyrgyzstan	Visa not required	30 days	30 days within any 60-day period.	No
Laos	eVisa / Visa on arrival	30 days	18 (Note: Savannakhet Airport; Lanetoui - Mengkang (China); Meuangmom - Wan Pong (Myanmar); Banvang - Ban Khok Phai (Thailand); Namngeun - Huay Kon (Thailand); Paksan - Bueng Kan (Thailand); Paktaphan - Pak Saeng (Thailand); Pangmon - Ban Huak (Thailand); Phoudou (Thailand); Dak ta ock - Nam Giang (Vietnam); La Lai (Vietnam); Namkan (Vietnam); Namphao - Cau Treo (Vietnam); Namsoy - Na Meo (Vietnam); Naphao - Cha Lo (Vietnam); Pahang - Long Sap (Vietnam); Panghok - Tây Trang (Vietnam); Phoukeua - Bo Y (Vietnam)) of the 33 border crossings are only open to regular visa holders.; e-Visa may be used to enter Laos through the Luang Prabang, Pakse and Vientiane international airports, 3 Thai-Lao Friendship Bridges (Note: Vientiane (Friendship Bridge 1); Savannakhet (Friendship Bridge 2); Bokeo (Friendship Bridge 4)), in Boten (road and railroad), and in Vientiane (at Khamsavath railway station).; Visa on arrival is available at the Luang Prabang, Pakse and Vientiane international airports, 4 Thai-Lao Friendship Bridges (Note: Vientiane (Friendship Bridge 1); Savannakhet (Friendship Bridge 2); Khammouane (Friendship Bridge 3); Bokeo (Friendship Bridge 4)) and 7 border crossings. (Note: Nongnokkheane - Trapeang Kriel (Cambodia); Boten - Bo han (China); Golden Triangle/Samliemkham (Thailand); Khamsavath railway station (Thailand); Namheuang - Ban Na Kraseng (Thailand); Vang tao - Chongmek (Thailand); Dansavan - Lao Bảo (Vietnam))	No
Latvia	Visa not required	90 days	90 days within any 180-day period in the Schengen Area.; A bilateral agreement pre-dating the Schengen area allows an additional 90 days of stay in Latvia (to a total of 180) regardless of days spent in other Schengen countries.	Yes
Lebanon	Free visa on arrival	30 days	Extendable for 2 additional months.; Visa waiver granted if there is no Israeli visa or seal and traveler has a telephone number, an address in Lebanon, and a non refundable return or circle trip ticket.; Pagers and handheld radios prohibited from boarding flights in Lebanon to protect aviation safety.; The US government advises its citizens not to visit Lebanon due to crime, terrorism, civil unrest, kidnapping, unexploded landmines, and the risk of armed conflict.	No
Lesotho	Visa not required	14 days	Extendable up to 180 days.	No
Liberia	Visa required		All persons entering Liberia are required to have a valid Certificate of Immunization (Yellow Book).; 3-year Multiple Entry Visa is the only option.	Yes
Libya	eVisa	30 days	The U.S. government advises its citizens not to visit Libya due to crime, terrorism, unexploded landmines, civil unrest, kidnapping, and armed conflict. U.S. citizens who are in Libya are urged to depart as soon as possible via commercial means if possible.; Independent travel is not permitted, and visitors must organize their visit through a tour guide. A tourist police escort is required at all times.; An eVisa will not be granted without a sponsor or tour agency.; A security letter issued by the Libyan Immigration Authorities may also be required.; Holders of passports containing an Israeli stamp or visa will be refused entry in Libya.	No
Liechtenstein	Visa not required	90 days	90 days within any 180-day period in the Schengen Area	Yes
Lithuania	Visa not required	90 days	90 days within any 180-day period in the Schengen Area.; Mandatory medical insurance.	Yes
Luxembourg	Visa not required	90 days	90 days within any 180-day period in the Schengen Area	Yes
Madagascar	eVisa / Visa on arrival	90 days	For stays of 61 to 90 days, the visa fee is 59 USD.	No
Malawi	eVisa / Visa on arrival	30 days		No
Malaysia	Visa not required	3 months	Immigration offenses, such as visa overstaying, are punishable by caning.	No
Maldives	Free visa on arrival	30 days	Extendable up to 90 days.; Permission from the Maldivian government required to travel to non resort islands.	No
Mali	Admission refused		International Certificate of Vaccination or Prophylaxis required.; Visas for U.S. citizens are valid for 5 years and are 185 USD.; The U.S. government advises its citizens not to visit Mali due to crime, terrorism, and kidnapping.; Following Niger's example, Mali has suspended visa services for U.S. citizens and barred Americans from entering.	Yes
Malta	Visa not required	90 days	90 days within any 180-day period in the Schengen Area	Yes
Marshall Islands	Freedom of Movement	Unlimited	Section 112 of the Immigration Act 2006 provides that a person who is not a citizen of the Republic may enter only if they hold a visa or are exempt from the requirement to hold a visa.; Section 113 of the Immigration Act 2006 exempts citizens of the United States, Palau and the Federated States of Micronesia from the requirement to hold a visa to enter the Republic.; Exempt persons remain subject to immigration clearance procedures upon arrival and departure and may be refused entry if ineligible for an entry permit under section 114.	Yes
Mauritania	eVisa	30 days	International Certificate of Vaccination or Prophylaxis required only for travellers arriving from high risk countries	No
Mauritius	Visa not required	90 days		No
Mexico	Visa not required	180 days	Visitors must obtain a Multiple Immigration Form. There is no charge for a tourist FMM for stays of less than 7 days when entering by land. For visitors staying more than 7 days and entering by land, it will cost 687 Mexican pesos or around US$40. The FMM is required for all visitors entering via air, regardless of length of stay, and the cost is included in the traveler's airfare and remitted by the airline.; Passport card or enhanced drivers license is valid for land and sea travel.; Exit stamp required if one entered using paper FMM (All land POEs); A person is in Mexico illegally if they did not get a FMM at the border (even if using the 7 day FMM fee exemption via land) or eFMM; Mandatory car disinfection at Mexico's southern borders (Guatemala and Belize)	No
Federated States of Micronesia	Freedom of Movement	Unlimited	Under Part 8 of the Federated States of Micronesia Immigration Regulations, a U.S. citizen entering the FSM to visit or remain is not required to obtain an entry permit, but must complete Form 5004 upon arrival.; U.S. citizens entering the FSM have the right to reside, work and do business in the FSM without additional immigration-related documents or procedures, and are not required to register their presence in the FSM.	Yes
Moldova	Visa not required	90 days	90 days within any 180-day period.; If entering Moldova through Transnistria, visitors should register their arrival with Moldovan authorities within three days.	No
Monaco	Visa not required	90 days	90 days within any 180-day period.	Yes
Mongolia	Visa not required	90 days	Registration required after 30 days.	No
Montenegro	Visa not required	90 days	Registration with the local police within 24 hours of arrival is mandatory.	No
Morocco	Visa not required	3 months		No
Mozambique	Electronic Travel Authorization	30 days	Visitors must register their ETA on the e-Visa platform at least 48 hours before travel and pay a processing fee of 48 USD.	No
Myanmar	eVisa	28 days	e-Visa holders must arrive via Yangon, Nay Pyi Taw or Mandalay airports or via land border crossings at Tachileik, Myawaddy, Kawthaung, Rih Khaw Dar or Tamu.; e-Visa available for both tourism (allowed stay is 28 days) or business (allowed stay is 70 days) purposes.; The U.S. government advises its citizens not to visit Myanmar due to armed conflict, the potential for civil unrest, arbitrary enforcement of local laws, poor health infrastructure, land mines and unexploded ordnance, crime, and wrongful detentions.	No
Namibia	eVisa / Visa on arrival	3 months	Beginning April 1st, 2025, US citizens will have to obtain a visa for Namibia. US citizens will be issued with visas on arrival upon payment of a designated fee.; Can be obtained online or on arrival for a fee of N$1,600 (approximately €82 / US$88).	No
Nauru	Visa required		Visas are issued with validity of 30 days.; Visa can be obtained in the Nauruan Press Office at the United Nations.	Yes
Nepal	Online Visa / Visa on arrival	90 days	Obtainable at Tribhuvan International Airport and certain land borders.; Total aggregate stay of no more than 150 days in any given calendar year.; U.S. citizens are eligible for five-year multiple entry visas.	No
Netherlands	Visa not required	90 days	90 days within any 180-day period in the Schengen Area (European Netherlands).; Residence permit (Verblijfstitel) for stays of longer than 90 days obtainable after arrival under certain conditions.	Yes
New Zealand	Electronic Travel Authority	3 months	eTA fee is NZD$17 requested via mobile app or NZD$23 requested via online plus an International Visitor Conservation and Tourism Levy (IVL) of NZD$100 must be paid. IVL not required for American Samoan citizens.; 3 months on each visit in 2-year period if granted.; May enter using eGate.; Holders of an Australian Permanent Resident Visa or Resident Return Visa may be granted a New Zealand Resident Visa on arrival permitting indefinite stay (pursuant to the Trans-Tasman Travel Arrangement).; Strict enforcement of food import laws, fines of NZD$400 for not declaring food.	Yes
Nicaragua	Visa not required	90 days	Tourist card must be purchased upon arrival.; Part of the Central America-4 Free Mobility Agreement.; In the CA4 area, a person gets 90 days total for the entire area. To reset their stay, they must leave the area.	No
Niger	Admission refused		Holders of a pre-approved confirmation from the National Police may obtain a visa on arrival (flyer visa) upon arrival at Niamey. The passport will be compounded for 1 working day and the traveler is required to appear at the Director General of Immigration the next working day to register and collect their passport.; International Certificate of Vaccination or Prophylaxis required.; The U.S. government advises its citizens not to travel to Niger due to crime, unrest, terrorism, health, and kidnapping.; Niger has suspended issuance of visas to U.S. citizens and openly barred Americans from entering.	Yes
Nigeria	eVisa	30 days	Business eVisas-on-arrival available for "Frequently Traveled Business Persons of International Reputes" or "Executives of Multi-national Companies", as well as for government officials; International Certificate of Vaccination or Prophylaxis required if arriving from a country with a risk of yellow fever transmission.	No
North Macedonia	Visa not required	90 days	Registration with the local police within 24 hours of arrival is mandatory.	No
Norway	Visa not required	90 days	3 months within a 6-month period, regardless of previous time spent in other Schengen countries, but including time spent in other Nordic countries.	Yes
Oman	Visa not required / eVisa	14 days / 30 days	Visa exemption valid for 14 days, e-Visa for 30 days.; Holders of a visa or entrance stamp of the Emirate of Dubai that is valid for at least 21 days are visa exempt.; Holders of a visa for Qatar that is valid for travel to Oman and valid for at least one month are visa exempt when arriving directly from Qatar.	No
Pakistan	eVisa	3 months		No
Palau	Visa not required	1 year	No visa is required for stays of one year or less.; Passport must have six months' validity beyond arrival and at least one blank page available for stamp.; Yellow fever vaccination is required if arriving from certain countries in South America or Africa; cholera vaccination is required if arriving from certain countries experiencing outbreaks.; Amounts of US$10,000 or more must be declared on entry and exit.	Yes
Panama	Visa not required	180 days	Denial of entry or transit to any person who has a criminal conviction.	No
Papua New Guinea	eVisa	60 days	Extendable for 30 days	No
Paraguay	Visa not required	90 days		No
Peru	Visa not required	90 days		No
Philippines	Visa not required	30 days	Naturalized US citizens who have ever held Philippine nationality (current or formerly) allowed to stay for up to one year as a balikbayan. This extends to their spouse and children of any age traveling with the dual-citizen/former Filipino, and present proof of association such as their marriage or birth certificate.	No
Poland	Visa not required	90 days	90 days within any 180-day period in the Schengen Area.; Dual nationals must use their Polish passport.; A bilateral agreement pre-dating the Schengen area allows a stay in Poland of 90 days, regardless of days spent in other Schengen countries.	Yes
Portugal	Visa not required	90 days	90 days within any 180-day period in the Schengen Area.	Yes
Qatar	Visa not required	90 days	Effective October 1, 2024, eligible US citizens will be granted 90 days visa free travel to the State Of Qatar; Visa issued upon arrival for no cost. There is a QAR 76 entry fee, valid for 90 days.; Persons with unpaid fines are prohibited from departing Qatar.	Yes
Romania	Visa not required	90 days	90 days within any 180-day period in the Schengen Area.	No
Russia	Visa required		72-hour visa-free transit for international cruise ship/ferry passengers only if travelling with an organized tour and accompanied at all times by a tour operator.; Registration required after 7 business days.; Russia signed the "Shared Values Visa" law on August 19, 2024, aimed at simplifying the residence permits for citizens of countries that do not share Russia's "traditional spirit and values". This list applies to 47 regions, including United States. The visa is valid for 3 months.; American citizens may receive multiple-entry visas valid for three years.; Residents of Alaska who are members of the indigenous population do not require a visa to visit Chukotka Autonomous Okrug if they have relatives (blood relatives, members of the same tribe, native people who have similar language and cultural heritage) in Chukotka. Individuals must be invited by a relative in Chukotka and must leave Chukotka within 90 days. Entry points are in Anadyr, Provideniya, Lavrentiya and Uelen.; The U.S. government advises its citizens not to visit Russia for any reason for the following reasons: Danger associated with the continuing war between Russia and Ukraine.; The risk of harassment or wrongful detention by Russian security officials.; The arbitrary enforcement of local laws.; The possibility of terrorism.; US citizens in Russia are advised to leave immediately.	Yes
Rwanda	eVisa / Visa on arrival	30 days	International Certificate of Vaccination or Prophylaxis required only if arriving from high risk countries as defined by WHO.	No
Saint Kitts and Nevis	Electronic Travel Authorisation	3 months	ETA fee is 17 USD.	No
Saint Lucia	Visa not required	6 weeks		No
Saint Vincent and the Grenadines	Visa not required	6 months		No
Samoa	Entry permit on arrival	90 days		No
San Marino	Visa not required			Yes
São Tomé and Príncipe	Visa not required	15 days	International Certificate of Vaccination or Prophylaxis required.	No
Saudi Arabia	eVisa / Visa on arrival	90 days	Access to Mecca and Medina are restricted to Muslims only and non-Muslims are denied entry.; Import of alcohol strictly prohibited.	No
Senegal	Visa not required	90 days	International Certificate of Vaccination or Prophylaxis required.	No
Serbia	Visa not required	90 days	90 days within any 180-day period.	No
Seychelles	Electronic Border System	3 months	Application can be submitted up to 30 days before travel.; Visitors must upload a reservation confirmation(s) for each visitor's location of stay in Seychelles.; Yellow fever vaccination certificate is required if coming from endemic countries.; Payment of the fee (EUR 10) by credit or debit card.; Valid for one journey only and it expires once exit the country.	No
Sierra Leone	eVisa / Visa on arrival	3 months / 30 days	International Certificate of Vaccination or Prophylaxis required.	No
Singapore	Visa not required	90 days	US citizens can use Automated Border Control	Yes
Slovakia	Visa not required	90 days	90 days within any 180-day period in the Schengen Area.; Medical insurance required.; Sufficient funds of US$50 per person per day required.; Registration within 3 working days required.	Yes
Slovenia	Visa not required	90 days	90 days within any 180-day period in the Schengen Area.; Registration with the local police required within 72 hours of arrival.	Yes
Solomon Islands	Free Visitor's permit on arrival	3 months	3 months within 12 months.; Visitors visa issued upon arrival for free.	No
Somalia	eVisa	30 days	All visitors must have an approved Electronic Visa (eTAS) before the start of their journey.; The U.S. government advises its citizens not to visit Somalia due to crime, terrorism, civil unrest, health, kidnapping, piracy, and lack of availability of routine consular services.	No
South Africa	Visa not required	90 days	Holders of passports without 2 blank pages may be denied entry.	No
South Sudan	eVisa		Printed visa authorization must be presented at the time of travel.; International Certificate of Vaccination or Prophylaxis required.; The US government advises its citizens not to visit South Sudan due to the security situation in the country. Crime, kidnappings, and armed conflict are present throughout the country.	No
Spain	Visa not required	90 days	90 days within any 180-day period in the Schengen Area.	Yes
Sri Lanka	ETA / Visa on arrival	30 days		No
Sudan	Visa required		If arriving from a country of high yellow fever risk and stayed for more than 12 hours, then Yellow Fever vaccine required.; Exit visa required.; Registration within 3 days mandatory.; The U.S. government advises its citizens not to visit Sudan due to armed conflict, civil unrest, crime, terrorism, and kidnapping.; Khartoum International Airport is currently closed, making it very difficult for Americans to leave the country.	Yes
Suriname	Visa not required	90 days	An entrance fee of USD 50 or EUR 50 must be paid online prior to arrival.; Multiple entry e-Visa is also available.	No
Sweden	Visa not required	90 days	90 days within any 180-day period in the Schengen Area.	Yes
Switzerland	Visa not required	90 days	90 days within any 180-day period in the Schengen Area.	Yes
Syria	eVisa / Visa on arrival	30 days	The eVisa portal is currently suspended.; Persons with passports bearing Israeli visas or entry/exit stamps are denied entry.; Visa not required for foreign citizens with proof of Syrian origin, such as an identification card or passport.; Dual-citizen males ages 17–42 need military service book.; If not forgiven by the military, dual-citizens may apply for a visit visa once a year through the embassy.; The U.S. government advises its citizens not to visit Syria for any reason due to the risk of terrorism, unrest, kidnapping, hostage taking, crime, and armed conflict.	No
Taiwan	Visa not required	90 days	Persons importing pork to Taiwan can be fined up to 1 million NT if caught.	Yes
Tajikistan	Visa not required / eVisa	30 days / 60 days	e-Visa also available.; e-Visa holders can enter through all border points.; Visa waiver stay is 30 days.; e-Visa gives a stay of 60.	No
Tanzania	eVisa / Visa on arrival	90 days		No
Thailand	Visa not required	30 days	Visa waiver program rules: 1. One can enter for 30 days per visa exempt stay.; 2. One can enter an unlimited number of times via air.; 3. Maximum of two entries if entering by sea or land. Else, one need hard visa.; 4. Overstayers will be banned and fined upon departure depending on length of overstay.; All passengers must complete the Thai Digital Arrival Card (TDAC), which is available starting 3 days before arrival.	No
Timor-Leste	Visa on arrival	30 days	For arrivals by air only	No
Togo	eVisa	15 days		No
Tonga	Free visa on arrival	31 days	Visas issued upon arrival at no charge to the passenger. Valid for 31 days.	No
Trinidad and Tobago	Visa not required	90 days		No
Tunisia	Visa not required	90 days		No
Turkey	Visa not required	90 days	Tourism and business purposes only.; Maximum stay of 90 days within any 180-day period.	No
Turkmenistan	Visa required		10-day visa on arrival if holding a letter of invitation provided by a company registered in Turkmenistan with a prior approval from the Foreign Ministry. Visitors can apply to extend their stay for an additional 10 days.; When transiting between two non-bordering countries, visitors can obtain a Turkmenistan transit visa for a five-day stay. This must be applied for in advance at the Turkmenistan Embassy. Visitors must also submit copies of the visas for the country of entry into Turkmenistan and the country of departure from Turkmenistan. Visa fee is 20 USD.	Yes
Tuvalu	Visa on arrival	1 month	Extendable up to 3 months.	No
Uganda	eVisa	3 months	Must apply online at least 2 business days prior to travel.; Airlines may deny passengers permission to board flights to Uganda without proof that they had successfully applied for an eVisa.; Ugandan immigration authorities may require additional documentation, including proof of a return plane ticket and detailed tour itinerary in Uganda.; International Certificate of Vaccination or Prophylaxis required.	No
Ukraine	Visa not required	90 days	90 days within any 180-day period; Entry via Russian occupied territories are considered illegal and will result in legal consequences; Entry only possible via land or sea following closure of air borders on February 24, 2022 due to the Russian invasion of Ukraine.; The U.S. government advises its citizens not to visit Ukraine due to Russia's aggression towards Ukraine.	No
United Arab Emirates	Visa not required	90 days	Extension possible with a fee.; Iris scan taken on arrival.; U.S. passport holders can sign up for E-Gate access on arrival/departure at Dubai International Airport.	No
United Kingdom	Electronic Travel Authorisation	6 months	An ETA is required to travel to the United Kingdom, including Northern Ireland.; eTA fee is £16; 6 months on each visit in 2-year period if granted.; Up to 90 days if arriving from Ireland (Common Travel Area)	Yes
Uruguay	Visa not required	90 days		No
Uzbekistan	Visa not required	30 days	5-day visa-free transit at the international airports if holding a confirmed onward ticket for a flight to a third country.; Registration within 3 days is mandatory.; Starting January 1, 2026, all U.S. citizens will be able to enter Uzbekistan visa-free and stay for up to 30 days.	No
Vanuatu	Visa not required	30 days	Extendable up to 120 days.	No
Vatican City	Visa not required	N/A	Open borders but de facto follows Italian visa policy.; No foreign accommodations, residency restricted to Vatican citizens only.; Even though no hotels exist in the Vatican, there is no limit to how many times a person may enter the country in a year.	No
Venezuela	eVisa		Introduction of Electronic Visa System for Tourist and Business Travelers.	Yes
Vietnam	eVisa		e-Visa is valid up to the exit date stated on application with a maximum length of 90 days, single and multiple entry options.; Phú Quốc visa exemption for up to 30 days.	No
Yemen	Visa required		Exit visa required for stays over 30 days.; Passengers can transit without visa with a confirmed onward ticket for a flight to a third country within 24 hours. They must stay in the international transit area of the airport and have documents required for the next destination.; Passengers can transit without visa with a confirmed onward ticket for a flight to a third country within 24 hours. They must stay in the international transit area of the airport and have documents required for the next destination.; Separately, Yemen introduced an e-Visa system for visitors who meet certain eligibility requirements (group travel of 10 or more people, business trips, and transit etc.).; The U.S. government advises its citizens not to visit Yemen due to terrorism, civil unrest, crime, health risks, kidnapping, armed conflict, and landmines.	Yes
Zambia	Visa not required	30 days	Visitors are eligible for a universal (KAZA) visa allowing access to Zimbabwe.; International Certificate of Vaccination or Prophylaxis required only travellers arriving from certain places as defined by Government. Please check the WHO 2020 Yellow Fever vaccination requirements document for exact list.	No
Zimbabwe	eVisa / Visa on arrival	1 month	Visitors are eligible for a universal (KAZA) visa allowing access to Zambia.; Tourism purposes only.	No

=== Territories or administrative subdivisions with different visa policies ===
Visa requirements for United States citizens for visits to various territories, disputed areas, partially recognized countries not mentioned in the list above, recognized administrative subdivisions that operate on different visa policies and restricted zones:

Visitor to	Visa requirement	Allowed stay	Notes (excluding departure fees)
Europe
Abkhazia	Visa required		Tourists from all countries (except Georgia) can visit Abkhazia for a period not exceeding 24 hours as part of an organized tourist group.
Åland Islands	Visa not required	3 months	
Belarus - Brest and Grodno	Visa not required	10 days	
Crimea	Visa required		Visa issued by Russia is required.
Novorossiya	Restricted area		Crossing from Ukraine requires visit purpose to be explained to Ukrainian passport control on exit and those who entered from Russia are not allowed to proceed further into Ukraine.
Northern Cyprus	Visa not required	3 months	Under certain conditions, may be only thirty or sixty days
Faroe Islands	Visa not required		
Gibraltar	Visa not required		
Guernsey	Visa not required		
Isle of Man	Visa not required		
Greece - Mount Athos	Permit required	3 days	Females and non-Christians denied entry.; Non-Orthodox Christians may obtain a permit (diamonitirion) from the Mount Athos Pilgrims' Bureau in Thessaloniki authorizing a stay of up to 4 days, limited to 10 people per day.; Orthodox Christians may obtain a permit for a stay of up to 4 days, limited to 100 people per day.; Arrangements must be made in advance with monastic communities for accommodation. Persons may only stay in a monastery for one night.; A permit may be issued to persons for 4-365 days to stay at one specific monastery in limited conditions.; Orthodox clerics must also receive permission from the Ecumenical Patriarchate of Constantinople in Istanbul; Visitors may only arrive by sea.; Certificate of Baptism required.
Kosovo	Visa not required	90 days	
Norway - Jan Mayen	Permit required	24 hours	Permit issued by the local police required for stays less than 24 hours; Permit issued by the Norwegian police required for stays of more than 24 hours.
Jersey	Visa not required		
Russia - Closed cities of Russia	Special authorization required		Several closed cities and regions in Russia require special authorization.
South Ossetia	Visa required		To enter South Ossetia, visitors must have a multiple-entry visa for Russia and register their stay with the Migration Service of the Ministry of Internal Affairs within 3 days.
Svalbard	Visa not required	Unlimited	Anyone of any nationality may live and work freely in Svalbard per the Svalbard Treaty.
Transnistria	Visa not required	45 days	Visitors must complete and obtain a temporary migration card at the border checkpoint. The maximum period of stay is 45 days, and it can be extended multiple times through this card.
Africa
Eritrea outside Asmara	Travel permit required		Travel Permit for Foreigners is required to travel outside of the capital.
Ascension Island	eVisa	3 months	3 months within any 1-year period.
Saint Helena	Visa not required		
Tristan da Cunha	Permission required		Permission to land required for 15/30 pounds sterling (yacht/ship passenger) for Tristan da Cunha Island; 20 pounds sterling for Gough Island, Inaccessible Island or Nightingale Islands.
Mayotte	Visa not required	90 days	
Sahrawi Arab Democratic Republic	Undefined		Undefined visa regime in the Western Sahara, same entry requirements with Morocco, controlled territory.
Somaliland	Visa on arrival	30 days	Obtainable on arrival or at the Somaliland Mission in Alexandria, VA.
Réunion	Visa not required	90 days	
Sudan outside Khartoum	Travel permit required		All foreigners traveling more than 25 kilometers outside of Khartoum must obtain a travel permit.
Sudan - Darfur	Travel permit required		Separate travel permit is required.
Asia
British Indian Ocean Territory	Special permit required		Special permit required.
People's Republic of China - Hainan	Visa not required	30 days	
Hong Kong	Visa not required	90 days	Visa required for holders of US diplomatic passports
India Protected and restricted areas of India	PAP/RAP required		Protected Area Permit (PAP) required for whole states of Nagaland and Sikkim and parts of states Manipur, Arunachal Pradesh, Uttaranchal, Jammu and Kashmir, Rajasthan, Himachal Pradesh.; Restricted Area Permit (RAP) required for all of Andaman and Nicobar Islands and parts of Sikkim.; Some of these requirements are occasionally lifted for a year.
Iraqi Kurdistan	eVisa	30 days	
Kazakhstan Baikonur & Priozersk	Special permission required		Special permission required for the city of Baikonur and surrounding areas in Kyzylorda Oblast, and the town of Priozersk near Almaty.
Iran - Kish Island	Visa not required		Tourists for Kish Island do not require a visa.
Macau	Visa not required	30 days	Visa required for holders of US diplomatic passports
Malaysia - Sabah and Sarawak	Visa not required		These states have their own immigration authorities and a passport is required to travel to them, but the same visa applies.
Maldives outside Malé	Permission required		Tourists are generally prohibited from visiting non-resort islands without the express permission of the Government of the Maldives.
Palestine	Visa not required		Travel to Gaza Strip may be restricted.
Tajikistan - Gorno-Badakhshan Autonomous Province	OIVR permit required		OIVR permit required.; Special permit required for Lake Sarez.
People's Republic of China - Tibet Autonomous Region	TTP required		Tibet Travel Permit required in addition to Chinese visa.
Saudi Arabia - Mecca and Medina	Special access required		Non-Muslims and those following the Ahmadiyya religious movement are strictly prohibited from entry.
Turkmenistan - Closed cities of Turkmenistan	Special permit required		A special permit, issued prior to arrival by Ministry of Foreign Affairs, is required if visiting the following places: Atamurat, Cheleken, Dashoguz, Serakhs and Serhetabat.
Vietnam - Phú Quốc	Visa not required	30 days	
Yemen outside Sanaa or Aden	Special permission required		Special permission needed for travel outside Sanaa or Aden.
Caribbean and North Atlantic
Anguilla	Visa not required	3 months	
Aruba	Visa not required	30 days	
Bermuda	Visa not required	6 months	
Caribbean Netherlands (Bonaire, St. Eustatius and Saba)	Visa not required	180 days	
British Virgin Islands	Visa not required	30 days	
Cayman Islands	Visa not required	6 months	
Colombia - San Andrés and Leticia	Tourist Card on arrival		Visitors arriving at Gustavo Rojas Pinilla International Airport and Alfredo Vásquez Cobo International Airport must buy tourist cards on arrival.
Curaçao	Visa not required	6 months	Maximum consecutive period of six months each calendar year.
France - French West Indies (Martinique, Guadeloupe, Saint Martin and Saint Barthélemy)	Visa not required	3 months	
Greenland	Visa not required		
Montserrat	Visa not required	6 months	
Puerto Rico	Freedom of movement	Unlimited	U.S. citizens and U.S. nationals may live and work freely in Puerto Rico.; Passport/EDL is not required for entry of U.S. Citizens.
Sint Maarten	Visa not required	6 months	Maximum stay allowed is 6 months uninterrupted with the possibility to extend.
Turks and Caicos Islands	Visa not required	90 days	
U.S. Virgin Islands	Freedom of movement	Unlimited	U.S. citizens and U.S. nationals may live and work freely in the U.S. Virgin Islands.; Passport / EDL is not required for entry of U.S. Citizens.
Oceania
American Samoa	Visa not required	30 days	Those classed as Samoan under local law enjoy permanent residence
Australia - Ashmore and Cartier Islands	Special authorisation required		Special authorisation required.
Christmas Island	Electronic Travel Authority	90 days	90 days; Passports and visas are not required when travelling from the Australian mainland. However, photographic identification must be produced for clearance through Customs and Immigration. Normal Australian Customs and Immigration procedures apply when entry is made from outside Australia.
France - Clipperton Island	Special permit required		Special permit required.
Cocos (Keeling) Islands	Electronic Travel Authority	90 days	90 days; Passports and visas are not required when travelling from the Australian mainland. However, photographic identification must be produced for clearance through Customs and Immigration. Normal Australian Customs and Immigration procedures apply when entry is made from outside Australia.
Cook Islands	Visa not required	31 days	
Fiji - Lau Province	Special permission required		Special permission required.
French Polynesia	Visa not required	90 days	90 days within any 180-day period.
Guam	Freedom of movement	Unlimited	U.S. citizens and U.S. nationals citizens may live and work freely in Guam.; Passport / EDL is required for entry. Under certain circumstances, a government issued photo ID and proof of citizenship may be used in lieu a passport on a case-by-case basis.
Niue	Visa not required	30 days	
New Caledonia	Visa not required	90 days	90 days within any 180-day period.
Norfolk Island	Electronic Travel Authority	30 days	30 days; Visa is issued upon arrival for a visit of up to max stay of 120 days, for holders of a multiple entry Electronic Travel authority (ETA) issued by Australia, valid 30 days beyond the period of intended stay in Norfolk Island.; From 1 July 2016 all movement between Norfolk Island and Australian mainland are considered as domestic movement, however all passenger are still required to carry passports or, for Australian citizens, some type of photographic identification and pass Customs and Immigration. Normal Australian Customs and Immigration procedures apply when entry is made from outside Australia. Passenger not carrying their passports are not eligible to purchase duty-free goods on Norfolk Island.
Northern Mariana Islands	Freedom of movement	Unlimited	U.S. citizens and U.S. nationals citizens may live and work freely in the Northern Mariana Islands.; Passport / EDL is not required for entry of U.S. Citizens.
Pitcairn Islands	Visa not required	14 days	
Tokelau	Entry permit required		
South America
Argentina - Misiones Isla Apipé and Isla del Medio	Visa not required	90 days	By being Argentine territories, the same visa policy applies.
Galápagos	Pre-registration required	60 days	60 days; Visitors must pre-register to receive a 20 USD Transit Control Card (TCT).
France - French Guiana	Visa not required	3 months	International Certificate of Vaccination required.
South Atlantic and Antarctica
Falkland Islands	Visa not required	1 month	A visitor permit is normally issued as a stamp in the passport on arrival, The maximum validity period is 1 month.
South Georgia and the South Sandwich Islands	Permit required		Pre-arrival permit from the Commissioner required (72 hours/1 month for 110/160 pounds sterling).
Antarctica	Special permits required		Special permits required for Bouvet Island, British Antarctic Territory, French Southern and Antarctic Lands, Argentine Antarctica, (Australia) Australian Antarctic Territory, (Antártica Chilena Province) Chilean Antarctic Territory, (Australia) Heard Island and McDonald Islands, (Norway) Peter I Island, (Norway) Queen Maud Land, (New Zealand) Ross Dependency.

== Pre-approved visas pick-up ==
Pre-approved visas can be picked up on arrival in the following countries instead of an embassy or consulate.

Pre-approved visas pick-up on arrival	Conditions
Bhutan	For a maximum stay of 15 days if the application was submitted at least 2 1/2 months before arrival and if the clearance was obtained.
Cameroon	Must hold approval from the General Delegate of Security.
Eritrea	Must have a sponsor who must submit an application at least 48 hours before arrival.
Liberia	Available only if arriving from a country without a diplomatic mission of Liberia and if a sponsor obtained an approval.
Nigeria	Holders of a visa application who have a Nigerian company taking responsibility for them.
Sudan	Holders of an entry permit issued by the Ministry of Interior.
Turkmenistan	Holders of an invitation letter from the local company that was approved by the Ministry of Foreign Affairs.

== Passport Card and EDL ==
The United States passport card or a state-issued enhanced driver's license (EDL) can be used as an alternative to the passport booklet only when travelling to and from Canada, Mexico, Bermuda, Anguilla, Antigua and Barbuda, Aruba, The Bahamas, British Virgin Islands, Caribbean Netherlands, Cayman Islands, Dominica, Dominican Republic, Grenada, Jamaica, Montserrat, Saint Kitts and Nevis, Saint Lucia, Saint Vincent and the Grenadines and Turks and Caico at maritime ports-of-entry or land border crossings. Passport cards and EDLs are proof of U.S. citizenship, but they are not valid for international air travel; if traveling by air, a passport book is required.

== APEC Business Travel Card ==
The APEC Business Travel Card (ABTC) is meant to facilitate travel for U.S. citizens engaged in verified business in the APEC region.

The U.S. ABTC should enable access to a dedicated fast-track lane for expedited immigration processing at some participating foreign APEC member airports.

U.S. APEC Business Travel Card holders may also use the Global Entry kiosks at participating airports upon their U.S. return.

As the U.S. is a transitional member of the ABTC scheme, however, the U.S. APEC Business Travel Card cannot be used in lieu of a visa to enter an APEC member country. The program was initially set to expire on September 30, 2018, but the November 2017 signing of the Asia-Pacific Economic Cooperation Business Travel Cards Act of 2017 (S. 504) ensured it would permanently remain.

== Consular protection of U.S. citizens abroad ==
American diplomatic missions, including embassies (blue), interests sections, and other representations (light blue)

The United States has the second most diplomatic missions of any country in the world. See also List of diplomatic missions of the United States and List of diplomatic missions in the United States.

The Department of State regularly publishes travel warnings or travel alerts.

== Foreign travel statistics ==
These are the numbers of visits by U.S. nationals to various countries in 2015 (unless otherwise noted):

Destination	Number of visitors
American Samoa (Note: Data for 2016)	17,560
Angola	17,259
Anguilla (Note: Data for 2017)	44,983
Antarctica	14,893
Antigua and Barbuda	96,347
Aruba (Note: Data for 2014)	576,793
Australia	781,000
Austria (Note: Counting only guests in tourist accommodation establishments.)	702,900
Azerbaijan	15,178
Bahamas	1,159,259
Barbados	168,945
Belgium	299,907
Belize	254,544
Bermuda	551,976
Bhutan	9,220
Bolivia	58,403
Bosnia and Herzegovina	25,926
Botswana	49,451
Brazil	475,232
British Virgin Islands (Note: Data for 2013)	442,434
Bulgaria	90,963
Burkina Faso	5,611
Cambodia	238,658
Cameroon	13,280
Canada	24,335,415
Cape Verde	4,282
Caribbean Netherlands: (Note: Data for arrivals by air only.): Bonaire; Saba; Sint Eustatius	5,900; 2,000; 2,700; 1,200
Cayman Islands	340,955
Chile	211,718
China	2,312,900
Colombia	529,013
Congo (Note: Data for 2012)	5,352
Cook Islands	8,372
Costa Rica	1,199,241
Croatia	451,947
Cuba	91,254
Curacao	59,714
Cyprus	25,388
Czech Republic	539,023
Dominica	17,773
Dominican Republic	2,073,963
Ecuador	259,406
El Salvador (Note: Excluding one-day visits)	447,628
Estonia	38,381
Eswatini	18,014
Fiji	81,198
Finland	124,997
France	3,622,362
French Polynesia	51,095
Gambia	4,058
Georgia	42,645
Germany	2,558,495
Greece	750,250
Greenland	2,767
Grenada	67,250
Guam	77,058
Guatemala	447,140
Guyana (Note: Data for 2010)	82,966
Haiti (Note: Data for 2007)	266,793
Hong Kong	1,215,629
Hungary	275,314
Iceland	576,403
Indonesia	316,782
India	1,376,919
Ireland	1,294,000
Israel	778,600
Italy	3,567,000
Jamaica	1,509,963
Japan	1,375,000
Jordan	166,441
Kazakhstan	29,632
Kiribati	1,319
Kyrgyzstan	14,200
Laos	38,765
Latvia	44,760
Lebanon	154,095
Lesotho	10,026
Lithuania	35,300
Luxembourg	32,144
Macau	186,378
Madagascar	4,165
Malaysia	198,203
Maldives	39,180
Malta	35,758
Malawi (Note: Data for 2009)	36,386
Mali	4,479
Martinique	6,463
Marshall Islands	1,546
Mauritius	9,655
Mexico	10,340,463
Micronesia	6,906
Moldova	21,878
Mongolia	16,684
Montenegro	18,874
Montserrat	1,665
Myanmar	76,502
Namibia	26,339
Nepal	42,687
Netherlands	1,450,000
New Caledonia	639
New Zealand	330,128
Niue	239
Nicaragua	288,538
North Macedonia	11,495
Northern Mariana Islands	8,528
Oman	58,598
Pakistan	73,129
Palau	7,546
Panama	338,590
Papua New Guinea	12,181
Paraguay	19,479
Peru	598,685
Philippines	957,813
Poland	474,100
Qatar	101,144
Romania	175,667
Russia	293,011
São Tomé and Príncipe (Note: Data for 2005)	154
Saint Lucia	152,738
Saint Vincent and the Grenadines	22,324
Samoa	10,177
Serbia	34,169
Seychelles	6,038
Singapore	565,250
Sint Maarten	236,379
Slovakia	45,670
Slovenia	95,863
Solomon Islands	1,623
South Africa	297,226
South Korea	868,881
Spain	2,650,068
Sri Lanka	57,479
Suriname	6,827
Taiwan	577,628
Tajikistan (Note: Data for 2019)	6,300
Tanzania	86,860
Thailand	1,056,124
Timor-Leste (Note: Data for arrivals by air only.)	2,557
Tonga	8,761
Trinidad and Tobago	161,539
Tunisia	13,896
Turkey	329,257
Turkmenistan	660
Turks and Caicos	315,247
Tuvalu	138
Uganda	57,959
Ukraine	153,778
United Arab Emirates	633,000
United Kingdom	3,308,000
Uzbekistan	17,160
Vanuatu	3,016
Venezuela	70,457
Vietnam	614,117
Zambia (Note: Data for 2015)	38,496
Zimbabwe	66,577

== See also ==
- Visa policy of the United States
- United States passport
- Bureau of Consular Affairs
- United States Passport Card
- List of citizenships refused entry to foreign states
