= Coalition for a Secure Driver's License =

American nonprofit organization

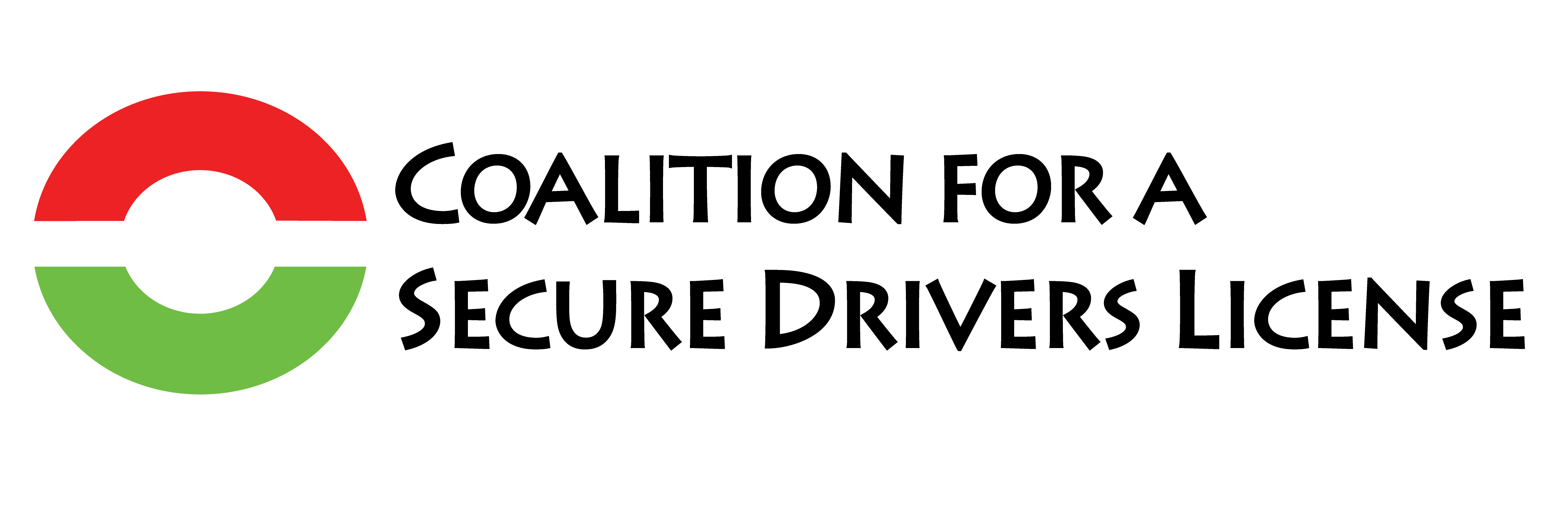
- Abbreviation: CSDL
- Formation: November 2001
- Type: 501(c)(3)
- Location: Washington, D.C.
- Website: www.secure-license.org

The Coalition for a Secure Driver's License (CSDL) is a 501(c)(3) nonpartisan, not-for-profit, crime prevention educational charity. It is funded by individual donor contributions and foundation grants.

The Coalition for a Secure Driver's License, according to its website, is committed to higher standards for both government and private entities that issue identity credentials, especially state agencies that issue driver's licenses and ID cards. The organization undertakes research projects addressing best practices for departments of motor vehicles (DMV), compliance with federal laws and regulations, identity fraud prevention and related identity management topics. CSDL provides research results and educational programs to the public and to state and federal officials. It is a member of the Document Security Alliance and of the American National Standards Institute.

== Goals and activities ==
CSDL was formed in November 2001, following the 9/11 investigation which revealed that the terrorists had fraudulently obtained over 30 valid IDs and driver's licenses. The 9/11 Commission recommended that "the federal government should set standards for the issuance of ... sources of identification, such as driver's licenses." Based on these findings Henry Buhl and Alan Weeden founded the CSDL as an organization to promote ID card security. One of the main goals of the Coalition for a Secure Driver's License was to create national standards based on best practices for driver's license and ID card issuance that states must meet.

The group opposed Governor Spitzer's effort to allow the state of New York to license immigrants regardless of their legal status because that effort would reduce the credibility of documentation required to obtain a license.

== Programs ==
=== Fake IDs are not worth the risks ===
This program seeks to educate the public on the consequences of purchasing and using a fake ID. It places posters in college dorm rooms, contributes flyers to college orientation packages, provides literature for law enforcement agencies to distribute, and travels around the country providing training and resources to combat fake IDs. By discouraging minors from breaking the law by using fake IDs, CSDL attempts to protect them from being arrested and having a permanent criminal record while also protecting the public from drunk drivers, alcohol related assaults, and alcohol related fatalities.

CSDL published an editorial in USAToday about fake IDs in April 2015.

=== Keeping IDentities Safe for KIDS ===
This program, stylized as "Keeping IDentities Safe for KIDS", was formed because criminals are increasingly using the identity information of children to obtain driver's licenses and IDs in new names because children have no criminal records or credit history, offering a blank slate for criminal activity. Using a fraudulently obtained driver's license, criminals can establish a line of credit or obtain employment with the child's identity. CSDL began working with the Boys & Girls Club in Washington state in November 2009 to create the Keeping IDentities Safe for KIDS program in order to raise awareness of the need for parents and guardians to take steps to protect their children's identities from theft and fraud. The program offers a suggested series of actions to be undertaken by parents on behalf of their children and encourages them to obtain Washington State ID cards. In some areas, the program offers reimbursement for parents or guardians obtaining ID cards for their children.

There are two levels of the KIDS program:

Level 1: A local sponsoring organization agrees to advise the community (through flyers, newspaper articles, state licensing agency contacts) that children are at risk from identity thieves and distributes educational brochures that explain why and how in detail. The brochures also explain that obtaining a state issued identity document reduces the risk, and will assist to correct the record should the child still be a victim of ID theft/ fraud.

Level 2 (Optional): Parents are asked to get their child a state issued identity document from the Washington Department of Licensing, with the inducement that during the time period the program is offered, there will be 100% reimbursement of the costs. CSDL will reimburse all parents and guardians with valid vouchers during the program's duration, usually 3 to 6 months from the distribution of educational brochures/vouchers. The parent must bring the state issued Identification Document (ID) or an Enhanced Identification Document (EID) with the child, to a location where the sponsor can confirm that the child has been recently issued a state ID/EID. Based on a completed request for reimbursement, the parent receives a check in the amount of the state fee for the ID/EID.

=== State awards ===
A state recognition awards program was established by the Board of Directors of CSDL in April 2009 to annually memorialize distinctive achievements of individual state agencies, including motor vehicle agencies. The program currently has four award categories: document security, for upgrades to the physical attributes of identity cards; public engagement, for information dissemination; identity protection, for fraud prevention programs; and homeland security, for improving processes to meet federal standards. Awards have been given to Nevada, Virginia, Nebraska, Colorado, Indiana, Florida, New Jersey, California, South Dakota, Delaware, Kansas, West Virginia, and New Mexico.

== Billboard controversy ==
In December 2005, the Coalition for a Secure Driver's License launched a billboard campaign in North Carolina urging the increase of driver's license issuance standards, which group members felt were overly lax. The billboard's slogan, "Don't License Terrorists" accompanied an image of a terrorist wearing a traditional Arab headdress while holding a driver's license and grenade. James Zogby, president of the Washington-based Arab American Institute, said the billboard was racist and anti-immigration for its depiction of an Arab man in traditional dress as a terrorist. Ernie Seneca, spokesman for North Carolina's Department of Transportation, replied that the state's driver's license program was sufficiently secure and Melanie Chernoff, deputy director of El Pueblo, a Hispanic advocacy group in Raleigh, said the billboard is unnecessary because license requirements in North Carolina already are strict. CSDL President Amanda Bowman defended the billboard, stating that North Carolina's driver's license program was vulnerable.

== See also ==
- Real ID Act
