= 5-11 Campaign =

Campaign against Real ID in the United States

The 5-11 Campaign is a single-issue, grassroots campaign that seeks to repeal the federal Real ID Act of 2005 and stop implementation of the Real ID Act in the United States. The campaign was founded on May 11, 2008, the date of enactment of the Real ID Act of 2005. The campaign works mainly through legislation submissions, grassroots activism, and grassroots community education.

== Background ==
The 5-11 Campaign began as a conversation at Brave New Books between Harlan Dietrich, the store's owner and literacy activist, and Sheila Dean, anti-Real ID activist and blogger. The idea for the campaign came about by contrasting 9-11, the culturally ingrained term for the World Trade Center disaster, with May 11, 2008 (5-11), the enactment date of the Real ID Act of 2005. The date 5-11 was seen as of critical importance, as every American’s citizenship is now in question.

== Positions ==
The 5-11 Campaign opposes the Real ID for reasons involving privacy, identity security, Constitutional sovereignty, the ineffective and wasteful nature of the bill, national security, and other reasons listed below.

=== Privacy ===
Proponents of 5-11 Campaign note the threat of Real ID's RFID technology permitting breaches of privacy, from tracking and profiling to identity theft and development of a Surveillance state. The Electronic Frontier Foundation warns that Real ID "will inevitably expand to facilitate a wide range of surveillance activities."

=== Identity security ===
The Real ID poses the threat of increased identity fraud. The machine-readable strip on each Real ID will contain unprotected personal information. The private sector and anyone with a barcode reader will have access to the cardholders personal data, which will expose the cardholder to tracking, profiling, and identity theft.

The Real ID will be vulnerable to insider and outsider fraud because The Real ID Act requires States to connect their drivers license data to the data of all 55 other states and territories. Thousands of false driver's licenses are already being issued by bribed state employees, and the Federal Government has exposed the personal information of as many as 40 million Americans to potential theft. The Real ID database will certainly be a target for identity thieves.

=== Passage of the Act ===
The 5-11 Campaign opposes the way that the Real ID Act was passed. While the official DHS site claims Congress responded to a recommendation from the 8/11 Commission Report by passing the Real ID Act, The Real ID Act of 2005 was previously rejected as a stand-alone bill and was then inserted into a bundled legislation bill HR1268, titled Emergency Supplemental Appropriations Act for Defense, the Global War on Terror, and Tsunami Relief, 2005. The 5-11 Campaign opposes the covert passage of the Real ID Act, as it was slipped into a bundle of unrelated legislation involving emotionally based issues of tsunami relief and increased funding for increased body armor for U.S. troops.

=== 4th Amendment ===
With personal and biometric information stored in an international database, the security of a person's information is at great risk, and the probability of identification theft is great. The demand of citizenship identity documents without criminal cause is an extreme escalation of government seizures.

=== 10th Amendment ===
"The powers not delegated to the United States by the Constitution, nor prohibited by it to the States, are reserved to the States respectively, or to the people."

The Real ID, as written today, can be used for “any official purpose” the Secretary of the Department of Homeland Security deems appropriate. The 5-11 Campaign does not trust the federal government with this kind of unrestrained, undefined authority. The federal government is violating the 10th amendment by attempting to force the states to comply with Real ID. DHS mandates Real IDs be used for "accessing a Federal facility; boarding Federally-regulated commercial aircraft; and entering nuclear power plants," then adds, "DHS may consider expanding these official purposes through future rulemakings to maximize the security benefits of REAL ID." The Real ID will inevitably expand into a de facto National ID card and an internal passport, "used to track and control individuals movements and activities."

=== Inefficiencies of the Real ID and government waste ===
States’ taxpayers will pay billions to comply with the Real ID Act of 2005, an unfunded federal mandate. The REAL ID application process will require that everyone apply and renew cards in person, leading to long lines of angry constituents. There is also concern that many groups of people, survivors of domestic violence and military personnel will not be able to produce the required documents to apply for a Real ID compliant license.

=== National security ===
The 5-11 Campaign believes that the security provisions determined by the Real ID Act, as currently written, are not only counterproductive but may in the future actually make the continental U.S. more vulnerable to malintent due to mandatory identity document storage in insecure database networks. The Campaign also believes that retention of a person's identity articles as they travel to and from the U.S. is excessive and does not serve the safety and security of America's citizens. They do not recognize preemptive crimes as a reason for legal search and seizure. NOTE: The 5-11 Campaign has no other security position other than what pertains to the Real ID Act.

The 5-11 Campaign also opposes the lack of state or public oversight of actions taken by elected or appointed officials on the matter of citizen identity use, storage and dissemination. Matters of identity are personal. There must be always be oversight and public input on how a U.S. citizen's personal information is being managed. The 5-11 campaign recognizes that participation in the Real ID is voluntary and those who are opposed to Real ID should not volunteer information for obtaining a Real ID.

=== Transportation and travel ===
The 5-11 Campaign feels there would be a duplication of efforts in the Real ID's stipulations that citizens use a Real ID as an internal passport for U.S. continental travel. A passport is sufficient to leave the continental U.S. and territories to enter another country.

The demand of citizenship identity documents without criminal cause is in violation of the 4th Amendment, which protects Americans from illegal search and seizures. The 5-11 Campaigners actively express their opposition to the use of Real IDs by presenting a passport when they fly, enter federal buildings and or circumstances where a Real ID card would be required by law.

=== Real ID and immigration ===
Organizations on both sides of the immigration issue have found fault with Real ID's immigration policy. No strategy introduced by the Real ID Act has been found to create relevant changes in illegal human trafficking, pecuniary employment of undocumented aliens, or their establishing residence in the U.S.

=== Identity technologies ===
The 5-11 Campaign opposes the use of RFID chips in identity documents because of their poor performance in identity security. They have failed in the U.S. Visitor and Immigration Status Indicator Technology (US-VISIT) program at the border, where the technology's read rates proved inadequate.

The 5-11 Campaign opposes the sharing of personal information and biometrics data internationally, as DHS's Robert Mocny proposed in the US-VISIT program. Global information sharing of biometrics data is a major threat to identity security. Not only would we have to trust our records with the AAMVA employees of the United States, but we would also be asked to trust the information technology systems and employees of other countries with whom we link our databases
