= Border Crossing Card =

Identification card for Mexicans to travel to the United States

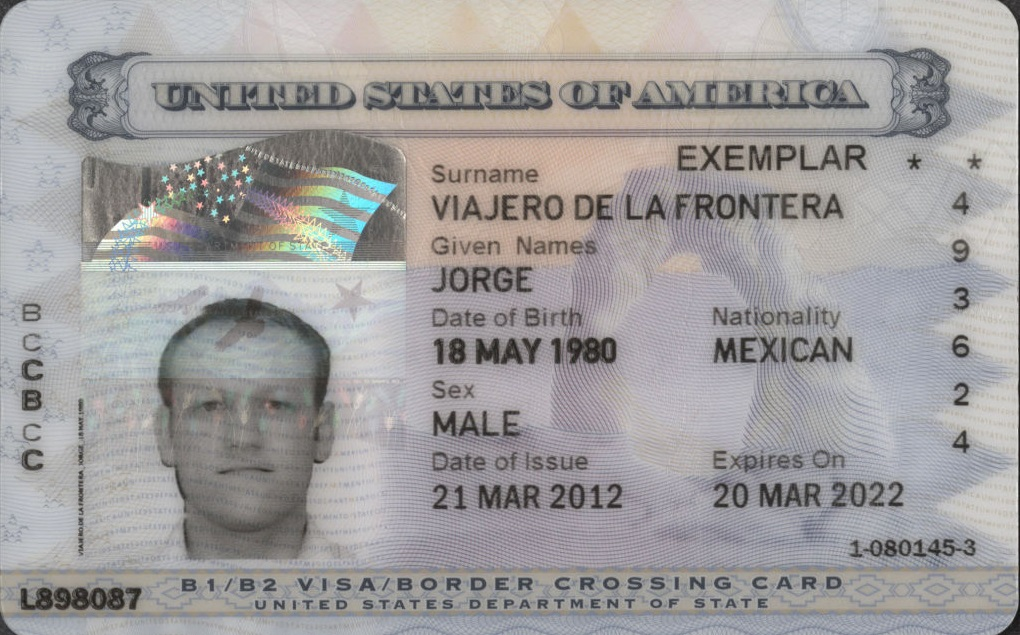
The front of the Border Crossing Card (3rd generation)

A Border Crossing Card (BCC) is an identity document used by nationals of Mexico to travel to the United States. As a standalone document, the BCC allows its holder to travel directly from Mexico to the United States by land, pleasure vessel or ferry. When presented with a valid Mexican passport, the BCC also functions as a B-1/B-2 visa and is accepted for travel from any country to any part of the United States by any means of transportation.

== History ==
Since 1953, Mexico and the United States have agreed to make special accommodations for Mexican nationals who cross the Mexico–United States border into the immediate area to promote the economic stability of the region. On November 12, 1953, the two countries entered into an agreement concerning the border area, which included a provision allowing Mexican nationals who resided near the border to be issued border-crossing identification cards. These cards could be used for multiple applications for admission during the validity of the card.

In 1982, the border zone that may be visited with a BCC without Form I-94, which is normally issued for visitors, was defined as the area within 25 miles (40 km) from the border. In 1999, the portion of the zone in Arizona was expanded to 75 miles (121 km) from the border. In 2004, the allowed period of stay in the border zone with a BCC without Form I-94 was expanded from 72 hours to 30 days. In 2013, the portion of the zone in New Mexico was expanded to 55 miles (89 km) from the border or up to Interstate 10.

== Eligibility ==
The BCC is issued only to Mexican nationals residing in Mexico and by the U.S. diplomatic missions in Mexico. Applicants must satisfy the same requirements as for a B visa, including demonstrating their ties to Mexico that would compel them to return after a temporary stay in the United States. The applicant must have a valid Mexican passport.

== Description ==
The first generation of machine-readable BCCs, known as "laser visas", was produced from April 1, 1998, until September 30, 2008. The laminated, credit card-size document is both a BCC and a B1/B2 visitor visa. The cards are valid for travel until the expiration date on the front of the card, usually ten years after issuance. They are nearly identical to the previous generation U.S. permanent resident card.

October 1, 2008, marked the beginning of production of a second generation B-1/B-2 visa/BCC. The new card is similar in size to the old BCC, but contains enhanced graphics and technology. The original BCC was produced by the now defunct Immigration and Naturalization Service but the current card is produced by the Department of State. It is virtually identical to the U.S. passport card, which is issued to nationals of the United States for the purposes of land and sea border crossings, in its general design layout. The card includes an RFID chip and integrated contactless circuit and is part of the same PASS system as the passport card.

== Use ==
As a standalone document, the BCC allows its holder to travel directly from Mexico to the United States by land, pleasure vessel or ferry. At the port of entry, BCC holders may apply for Form I-94, which is normally issued for visitors, and continue their visit to any part of the United States for the period specified on the form, usually six months. If they do not apply for Form I-94, they may remain in the following border areas for up to 30 days:

- California within 25 miles (40 km) of the border
- Arizona within 75 miles (121 km) of the border
- New Mexico within 55 miles (89 km) of the border or up to Interstate 10, whichever is further north
- Texas within 25 miles (40 km) of the border

When presented with a Mexican passport, the BCC functions as a B visa and is accepted for travel from any country to any part of the United States by any means of transportation.

== See also ==
- B visa
- Enhanced driver's license
- NEXUS card
- United States passport card
