= Veteran Health Identification Card =

Identification card issued by the United States Department of Veterans Affairs

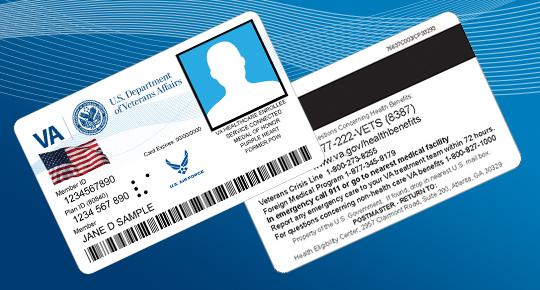
Veterans Health Identification Card as of 2014

The Veteran Health Identification Card (VHIC) is an identification card issued by the United States Department of Veterans Affairs (VA) for eligible veterans to receive medical care at VA Medical Facilities. The VHIC protects the privacy of veterans' sensitive information, as it no longer displays the Social Security number or date of birth on the front of the card. The VHIC will only display the veteran's name, picture, and special eligibility indicators—Service Connected, Purple Heart and former POW, if applicable, on the front of the card. Only veterans who are eligible for VA medical benefits will receive the card.

Starting on Jan. 1, 2020, the Purple Heart and Disabled Veterans Equal Access Act allows Purple Heart recipients, former prisoners of war and veterans with service-connected disabilities entry onto military installations to use the AAFES Exchange; commissary and Morale, Welfare and Recreation facilities. Pre-identified primary caregivers of veterans with service-connected disabilities, as documented by the Department of Veterans Affairs, will also be granted entry onto the installation and access to these facilities. To access the base, these veterans will need to show a VHIC.

== Background ==
=== Purpose ===
The only purpose of the card is for identification and check-in for VA appointments at VA Medical Centers (VAMC), Outpatient Clinics (OPC) and Community Based Outpatient Clinics (CBOC). The VHIC cannot be used as a credit card or an insurance card, and it does not authorize or pay for care at non-VA facilities.

=== Veterans Health Identification Card ===
In 2014 the Veterans Administration established a newly designed Veterans Health Identification Card (VHIC) to replace the legacy Veterans Identification Card (VIC). The new Veterans Health Identification Card comes with additional security features and a different look and feel, replaced the old Veteran Identification Card, first issued in 2004. The new cards will protect against identity theft and will be personalized with the emblem of the veteran's branch of service. Other new features add "VA" in braille, to help visually impaired veterans, along with VA phone numbers and emergency-care instructions.

== Qualification ==
=== Minimum duty requirements ===
Most veterans who enlisted after September 7, 1980, or entered active duty after October 16, 1981, must have served 24 continuous months or the full period for which they were called to active duty in order to be eligible. This minimum duty requirement may not apply to veterans who were discharged for a disability incurred or aggravated in the line of duty, for a hardship or "early out", or those who served prior to September 7, 1980. Since there are a number of other exceptions to the minimum duty requirements, VA encourages all veterans to apply so that they may determine their enrollment eligibility.

Veterans who may qualify (Note: This is not a comprehensive list and veterans should check with the VA to see if they qualify. Many unique circumstances lead to qualification.)

- Veterans with a service-connected disability rating
- Served in combat or in a war zone
- Medical conditions incurred while in the service
- Location of service
- Served in theater of combat operations within the past five years
- Received a Purple Heart Medal
- Former Prisoner of War
- Receive VA pension or disability benefits
- Make less than US$62,000 annually
- Honorable, General, or Other-Than-Honorable, Clemency, Bad Conduct Discharge

Veterans who are disqualified

- Dishonorable Discharge: with this characterization of service, all veterans' benefits are lost, regardless of any past honorable service

In September 2011, the Veterans ID Card Act, HR 2985, was introduced by US Congressmen Todd Akin, and Silvestre Reyes. The bill would allow the VA to issue photo identification cards to veterans who are not retirees but who also do not presently receive VA medical benefits.

=== State and local government veterans cards ===
Other jurisdictions at state, county and municipal levels have also created their own identification card schemes for easier veteran access to discounts and other benefits within the jurisdiction. In most states, including Washington, D.C. and Puerto Rico, a person's driver's license or state identification card may optionally carry a veteran status identifier.

== See also ==
- Veterans Health Administration
