= Enhanced driver's license =

Type of driver's license with passport features

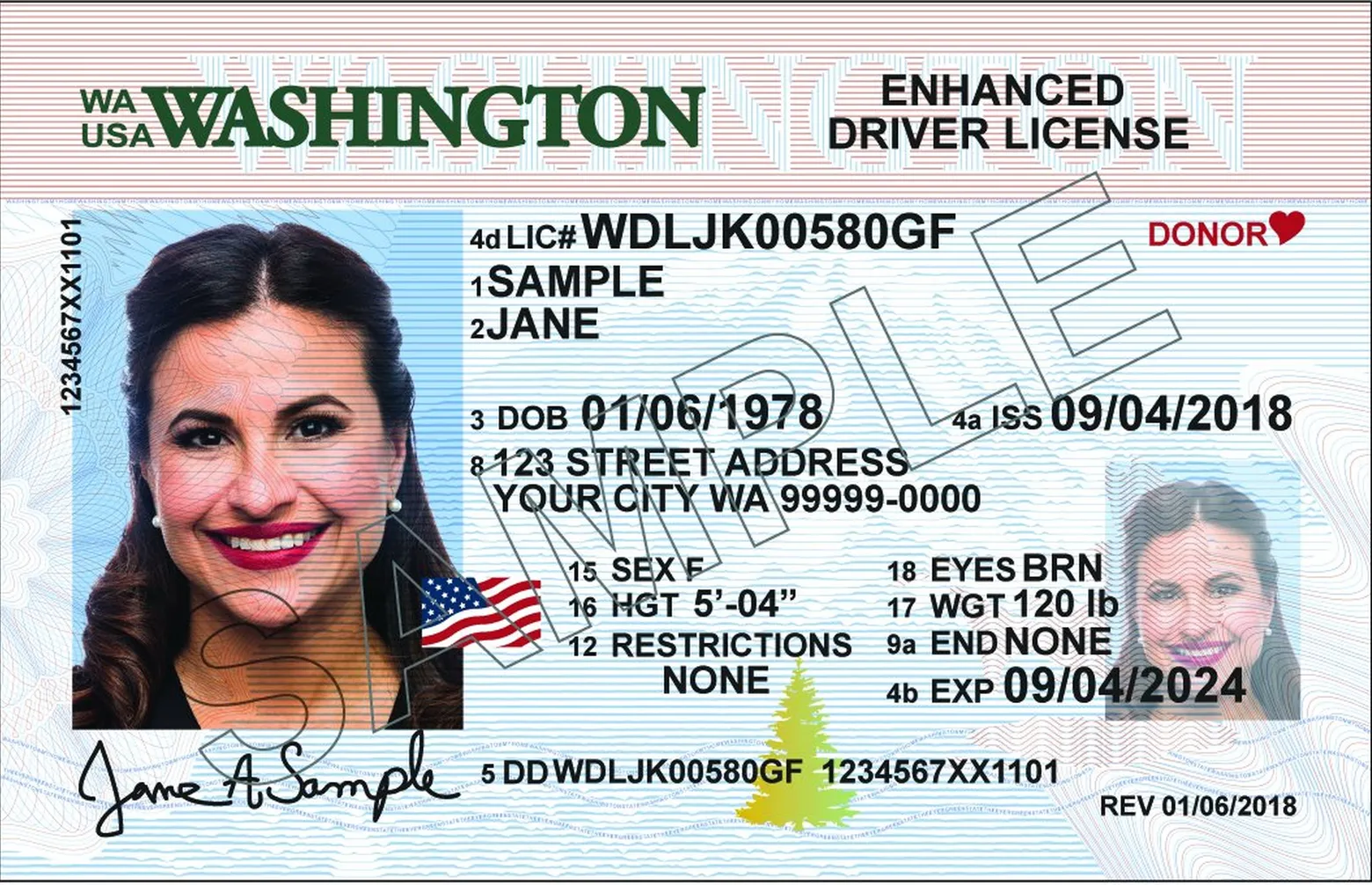
Washington State Enhanced Driver's License - Sample

An enhanced driver's license (EDL) or enhanced ID, is a card which functions as both driving license and identity card with limited passport features, issued in some states in the United States and formerly issued in some provinces in Canada, for people who are both citizens of the country and residents of the relevant region, compliant with the Western Hemisphere Travel Initiative.

== United States ==
EDLs are available to U.S. citizens who reside in the states of Michigan, Minnesota, New York, Vermont, and Washington. Ohio passed a law in 2023 to offer EDLs, but the law was repealed before the IDs ever came into effect.

In 2015, the California legislature passed a bill to implement EDLs, but it was vetoed by Governor Jerry Brown over privacy concerns surrounding the radio-frequency identification (RFID) chip used in the EDL. At the time, the ACLU was actively working to oppose the roll-out of EDLs saying that the RFID chips could be used for tracking and racial profiling.

An EDL is similar to the United States passport card in that it allows for international land and sea travel, but not air travel, to countries that recognize it. EDL cards include a RFID chip and barcode for automated identification of the card and its holder.

As a Western Hemisphere Travel Initiative-compliant travel document, an EDL may be used for "official purposes" (such as boarding a domestic flight) covered by the U.S. Real ID Act. Unlike EDLs, Real ID-compliant licenses alone are not sufficient to cross international borders even if a state gives its Real ID-compliant licenses a similar name.

== Canada ==
As of August 2022, no Canadian province or territory is issuing EDLs and the program will terminate in the country once the validities of all existing EDLs lapse. Previously, EDLs were available to Canadian citizens residing in British Columbia, Manitoba, Ontario, and Quebec. Between 2008 and 2009, the Saskatchewan government spent approximately $600,000 to develop EDLs for the province. However after nearly a year into development, the Bill to codify EDLs into provincial law was voted down after an investigation by the Province's Privacy Commissioner and none were ever issued.

After running an EDL program for five years, Quebec discontinued the cards program on 30 September 2014, citing low demand as the reason. All Quebec EDLs had expired by 2019. Ontario terminated the program in June 2019 as a government initiative to save costs, although existing EDLs remain valid until their expiration dates. British Columbia announced in early 2021 that the province would be phasing out EDLs and no new applications would be accepted from 18 January 2021 for similar reasons. In February 2021, Manitoba, the last province that was still accepting new applications, announced that it would be discontinuing the enhanced driver's licenses and enhanced identification cards in 2022. The province terminated the program in June 2022 and no new cards would be produced.

== See also ==
- Driver's licenses in Canada
- Driver's licenses in the United States
  - Real ID Act
- Cards from other programs that may be used to enter the United States without a passport by land
  - Free and Secure Trade (FAST)
  - Global Entry
  - NEXUS
  - Secure Electronic Network for Travelers Rapid Inspection (SENTRI)
