= United States passport card =

U.S. identity card

United States Passport Card
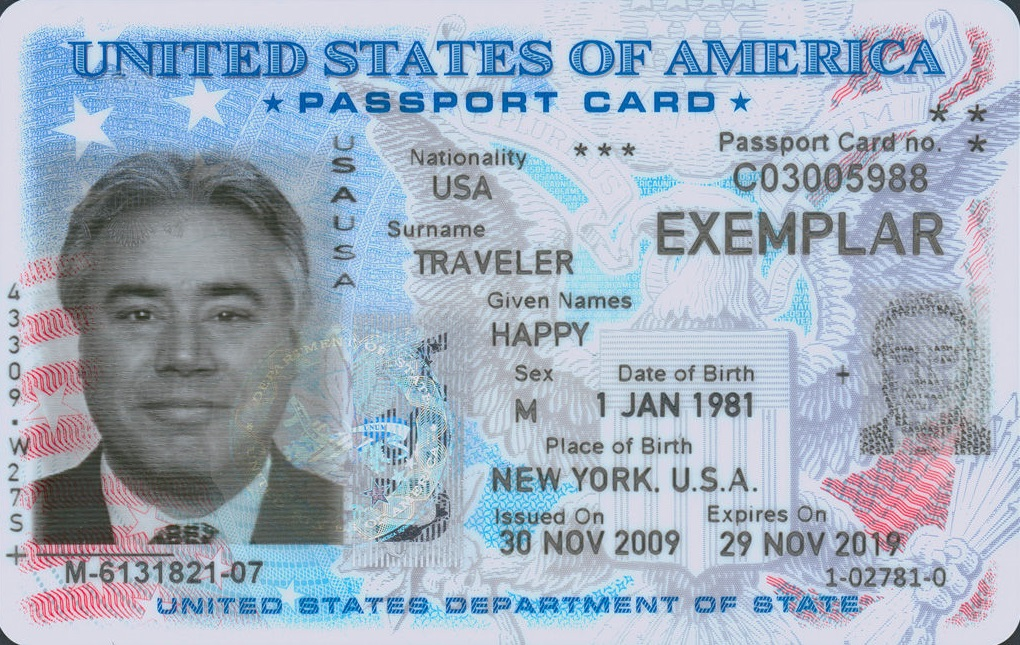
- The front of a United States passport card

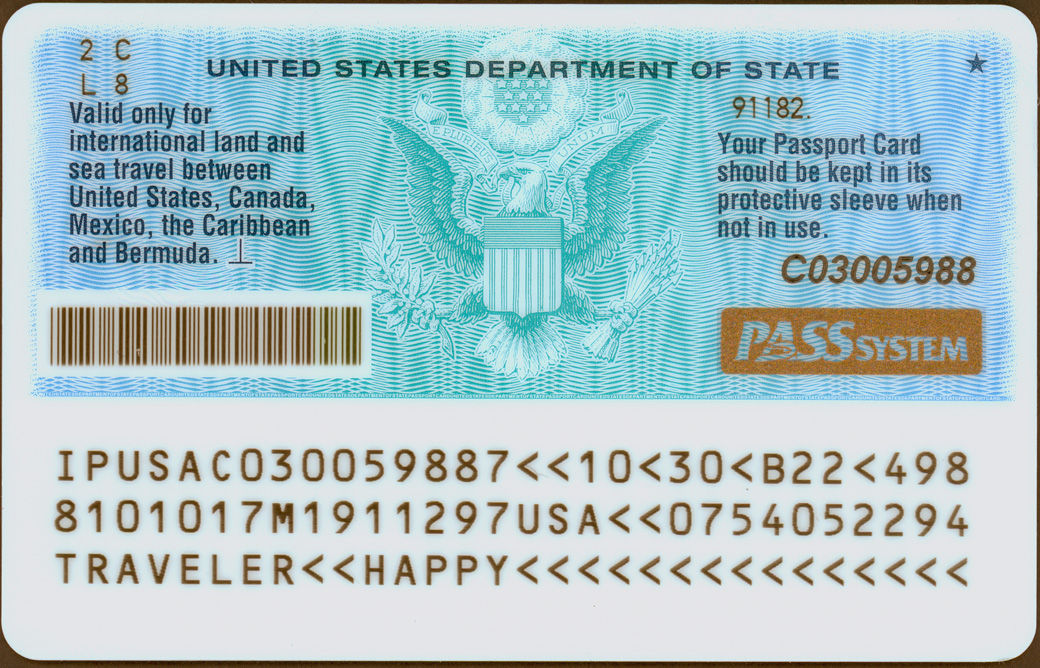
- The back of a United States passport card
- Type: Identity document Travel document
- Issued by: Department of State
- First issued: 2008
- Purpose: Identification
- Eligibility: United States nationality
- Expiration: 10 years after date of issue for people 16 or older; 5 years for minors under 16
- Cost: $30 (adults) / $15 (minors under 16) $35 administration fee (required for all minor's cards and passports and an adult's first passport. Only one administration fee is charged for an individual applying for both a card and book at the same time.)

The United States passport card is an optional national identity card and a travel document issued by the U.S. federal government in the size of a credit card. Like a United States passport book, the passport card is only issued to U.S. nationals (Note: The term U.S. nationals includes U.S. citizens and U.S. non-citizen nationals.) exclusively by the U.S. Department of State. The passport card allows its holders to travel by air within the United States, and to travel by land and sea within part of North America. However, the passport card cannot be used for international air travel. U.S. passport cards can be used to verify identity and U.S. nationality. The requirements to attain the passport card are identical to the passport book.

The passport card (previously known as the People Access Security Service Card or PASS Card) was created as a result of the Western Hemisphere Travel Initiative, which imposed more stringent documentary requirements on travelers. As of 2025, more than 40 million passport cards have been issued to U.S. nationals. The card is manufactured by Idemia.

National identity cards with similar utility are common inside the European Union and European Free Trade Association countries for both national and international use, with the difference that such cards can also be used for international air travel (within the EU, the Schengen Area and several other European countries that allow entry with a national ID card).

== History ==
As a result of the September 11, 2001 attacks, the United States began implementing a range of measures to increase the security of its borders and its identity documents. One result of this was the Western Hemisphere Travel Initiative (WHTI), which mandated that a smaller, more secure number of documents verifying both identity and nationality be used to facilitate identification and international border crossing. Before the WHTI, many different types of documents were acceptable to cross the border, including birth certificates issued by thousands of different authorities within the United States and Canada. As a result of the WHTI, U.S. nationals traveling to Canada would have been required to obtain a passport book in order to enter the United States. In order to offer a less expensive and more portable alternative to border communities and frequent travelers, the passport card was developed.

In an effort to improve efficiency at land crossings, the passport card also includes a vicinity-read radio frequency identification chip with a unique identifying number tied to government databases. Unlike the passport book, the RFID chip in the passport card is designed to be readable at a greater distance, allowing border agents to access traveler information before they pull up to the inspection station. While a biometric passport contains a chip containing all of the traveler's information in electronic format, the RFID chip in a passport card does not contain any personal information beyond the identifying number, which is used to locate records in secure government databases. To prevent the RFID chip from being read when the card is not being used, the card comes with a sleeve that stores the card when it's not in use and blocks the radio frequencies used by the RFID chip. The passport card's chip is conformant to GS1 EPC standards, as a GDTI-96 (Global Document Type Identifier) with the GS1 company prefix set to 0893599002 (Department of State, Consular Systems & Technology), the document type set to 01, and the aforementioned opaque identifying number as the serial number.

Passport cards with a third gender option, represented by an X marker, began to be issued in late 2023 (despite the earlier implementation in passport books). This later implementation was due to delays caused by necessary technological updates. It was discontinued by the second Trump administration via executive order. However, this has since been blocked in Federal district court due to a preliminary injunction issued in the case, Orr v Trump. Passport cards and books with an “X” gender marker have therefore resumed being issued to members of the class covered by the lawsuit.

== Use ==
=== As an international travel document ===
U.S. passport cards can be used to enter the United States at land border crossings and sea ports of entry. The card is also accepted for entry by land or sea into Canada, Mexico, Bermuda, and some countries and territories in the Caribbean (excluding Barbados, Cuba, Haiti, Trinidad and Tobago, and French overseas territories). It cannot be used to travel by air to these countries, or by any means to other countries.

The Department of State stated that the reason for this limited validity was that "designing a card format passport for wide use, including by air travelers, would inadvertently undercut the broad based international effort to strengthen civil aviation security and travel document specifications to address the post 9/11 threat environment".

=== As personal identification ===
Aside from being unable to be used for international air travel, the passport card is treated as a passport for all other purposes. A United States passport card can be used as primary evidence of United States nationality, just like a passport book, and can be used as a valid proof of identity and nationality both inside and outside the United States. The passport card also distinguishes non-citizen nationals (who form a very small percentage of US nationals) from US citizens by listing "U.S. National" under nationality rather than "USA".

==== Within the United States ====
Under the REAL ID Act, the passport card is accepted for federal purposes (such as domestic air travel or entering federal buildings), which may make it an attractive option for people whose driver's licenses and ID cards were not REAL ID-compliant when those requirements went into effect on May 7, 2025. TSA regulations list the passport card as an acceptable identity document at airport security checkpoints.

U.S. Citizenship and Immigration Services has indicated that the U.S. passport card may be used in the Employment Eligibility Verification Form I-9 process. The passport card is considered a "List A" document that may be presented by newly hired employees during the employment eligibility verification process to show work authorized status. "List A" documents are those used by employees to prove both identity and work authorization when completing the Form I-9.

Passport cards are much less popular than driver licenses, a commonly used form of identification. In 2023, there were fewer than 25 million valid passport cards in circulation (issued in the previous 10 years). In contrast, in 2023 there were about 238 million licensed drivers.

==== Outside the United States ====
In some countries, laws require foreign visitors and/or all adults to carry official personal identification at all times. Carrying a passport card may meet the demands of local law enforcement without the risks associated with carrying the full passport book.

Compared with state ID cards and driver's licenses, the passport card is designed to be more universal. It is formatted to United Nations ICAO machine readable document standards, which are used on IDs around the world. Also, unlike state driver's licenses, which may not even list the country on them, the passport card contains the words United States of America in its header. It also contains national symbols, such as a U.S. flag, in the background, as opposed to the state symbols found on driver's licenses. Since people abroad may not be familiar with every U.S. state, the passport card's emphasis on being from the United States makes it more understood in this regard.

== Validity and fees ==
The passport card shares the same validity period as the passport book: 10 years for persons 16 and over, 5 years for children under 16. As of 2026, the passport card renewal fee for eligible applicants (adults only, by mail or online) is US$30; first-time applicants and those applying in person must also pay a $35 processing fee, for a total fee of $65. Passport cards for children must be applied for in person; the total fee is $50, including the $35 processing fee.

Adults who already have a fully valid passport book may pay a fee of $30 to apply for the card using the passport renewal form, regardless of when the passport book expires.

A U.S. national is allowed to hold both a passport card and a passport book. Both may be applied for simultaneously by paying the respective fees for each passport, plus a single $35 processing fee for first-time and other in-person applicants.

== Card layout ==
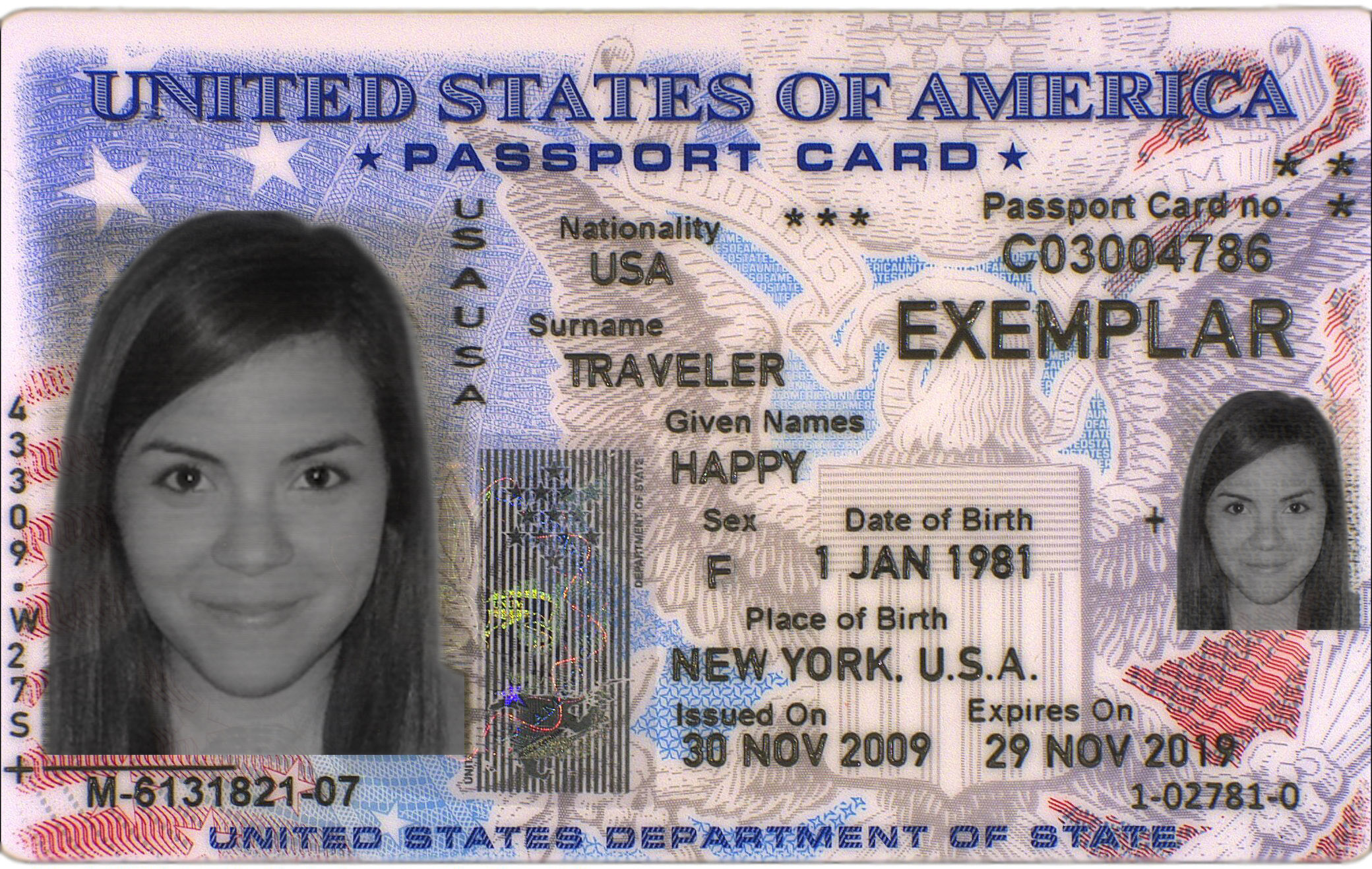
Figure 1: Front of Card blank artwork (2008).

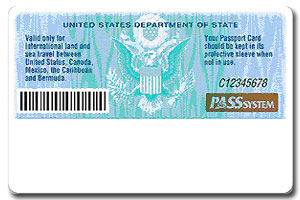
Figure 2: Card back artwork (2008).

The passport card is formatted according to specifications for credit card (ID-1) sized travel documents, as described in ICAO Document 9303, Part 3, Volume 1. The card contains both human-readable and machine-readable information; the latter is printed in the machine-readable zone on the rear of the card as OCR-readable text in a similar format as on the identity page of the passport book. The zone starts with the letters IP (designated by ICAO for passport card), followed by the issuing country code USA and then the passport card's serial number (which is prefixed with a "C" and differs from the individual's passport book number, even if issued together). The general layout of the passport card is virtually identical to the layout of the Border Crossing Card issued to Mexican nationals with primarily the background imagery and entitlements varying between the two cards.

=== Anti-counterfeiting features ===
In addition to the embedded RFID chip, the front of the card features a complex multi-layer hologram consisting of an American bald eagle surrounded by the words "United States of America Department of State" in a small clearly readable font, further surrounded by the same words repeatedly in microprint. The card's background consists of interweaving smooth curves rich in variable color and microprint. All of the personal information on the card is created by laser engraving, with some key information produced in raised tactile engraving, including the date of birth, vertical letters "USA", the passport card number, and an alphanumeric sequence underneath the photograph. A second, smaller "ghost" photograph of the bearer is included on the right side of the card; when closely inspected this ghost image is actually an approximation of the shading in the original photo composed of various letters from the card holder's name. There is an embossed seal in the upper left hand corner of the card (partially overlapping the photograph) depicting the obverse of the Great Seal of the United States. When viewed under UV lighting, a reddish-orange bald eagle in flight appears. The eagle carries thirteen arrows in one talon and an olive branch with thirteen leaves and thirteen olives on the branch. The eagle's image is 3-dimensional, with the flying figure poised above the shield from the Great Seal. In its beak, the eagle clutches a scroll with the motto E pluribus unum ("Out of Many, One"). On the rear of the card, the "PASSsystem" mark appears in optically variable ink, and the number C######## is a raised tactile engraving.
