= Identity documents in the United States =

In the United States, identity documents are typically the state-issued driver's license or identity card, while also the Social Security card (or just the Social Security number) and the United States passport card may serve, as national identification. The United States passport itself also may serve as identification. There is, however, no official "national identity card" in the United States, in the sense that there is no federal agency with nationwide jurisdiction that directly issues an identity document to all US citizens for mandatory regular use.

There have been proposals to nationalize ID cards, as currently citizens are identified by a patchwork of documents issued by both the federal government as well as individual state and local governments.

It is both a political issue and a practical one, and the idea of federalism is cited as supporting federated (regional) identification. All legislative attempts to create a national identity card have failed due to tenacious opposition from liberal and conservative politicians alike, who regard the national identity card as the mark of a totalitarian society.

The most common national photo identity documents are the passport and passport card, which are issued by the U.S. Department of State to U.S. nationals only upon voluntary application. Issuance of these documents is discretionary - that is, for various reasons, the State Department can refuse an application for a passport or passport card.

More recently, various trusted traveler programs have been opened to the public in the United States, including TSA Precheck, SENTRI, NEXUS, FAST (Free and Secure Trade), and Global Entry. With the exception of TSA Precheck, which provides a unique “Known Traveler Number”, these programs provide photo IDs issued by the Department of Homeland Security and are considered national photo IDs.

The driver's license, which is issued by each individual state, operates as the de facto national identity card due to the ubiquity of driving in the United States. Each state also issues a non-driver state identity card which fulfills the same identification functions as the driver's license, but does not permit the operation of a motor vehicle.

Social Security cards have federal jurisdiction but cannot verify identity. They verify only the match between a given name and a Social Security Number (SSN) and were intended only for use in complying with Social Security payroll tax laws. They now are used in a wider scope of activities, such as for obtaining credit and other regulated financial services in banking and investments.

== Birth certificate ==
The birth certificate is the initial identification document issued to parents shortly after the birth of their child. The birth certificate is typically issued by local governments, usually the city or county where a child is born. It is an important record, often called a "feeder document," because it establishes U.S. citizenship through birthright citizenship, which is then used to obtain, or is the basis for, all other identity documents. By itself, the birth certificate is usually only considered proof of citizenship but not proof of identity, since it is issued without a photograph at birth, containing no identifying features. A birth certificate is normally produced along with proof of identity, such as a driver's license or the testimony of a third party (such as a parent), to establish identity or entitlement to a service.

A child born abroad to two U.S. citizen parents, or one citizen parent and one non-citizen, also typically has citizenship from birth. Such births are registered with the nearest U.S. embassy or consulate. If the embassy or consulate determines the child acquired citizenship at birth, it issues a Consular Report of Birth Abroad, also known as Form FS-240. A birth certificate will also be issued locally in the country where the child was born. The consular report is proof of U.S. citizenship and may be used to obtain a passport for the child and register the child for school, among other purposes.

== Social Security card ==
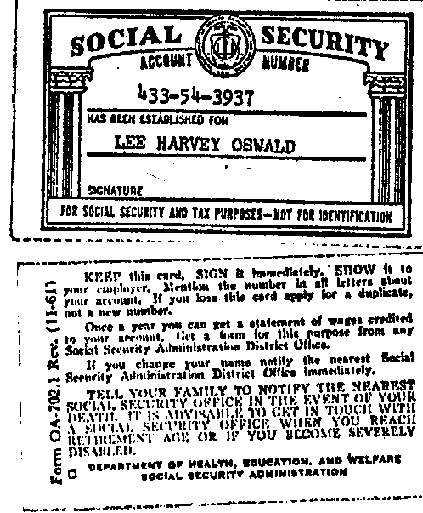
SSN Card with Not For Identification Purposes tagline

The Social Security number (SSN) and card are issued by the Social Security Administration. Almost all parents voluntarily apply for a Social Security number shortly after the birth of a child. In the absence of a national identity card (and concordant national identity number), the Social Security number has become the de facto national identifier for a large variety of purposes, both governmental and non-governmental.

The SSN was created to ensure accurate reporting of a worker's wages to the Social Security Administration. Prior to 1986, it was common to apply for a SSN shortly before it might be needed, most often when a teenager. Tax reform acts of 1986, 1988, and 1990 required parents to supply the SSN of children over age 5, 2, or 1 respectively, to receive an income tax deduction for the child. This led to parents applying for their children's SSN at birth.

Because their original purpose was so limited, Social Security cards were not designed with the rigorous security measures typically expected of identity documents. They do not have a photograph or physical description of the bearer, nor are they required to be renewed. Therefore, the Social Security card is not usually considered proof of identity, only proof that the person named on the card holds the number indicated on the card. It is normally used in conjunction with other documents, such as a photo ID, to prove that the person holding the card is legally present in the U.S. and has the right to work in the U.S. (unless the card is marked with a restriction).

Many organizations, universities, and corporations historically used SSNs to uniquely identify their customer or student populations. The Family Educational Rights and Privacy Act of 1974, also known as the Buckley Amendment, required changes that eliminated the use of the SSN as an identifier for a student. Educational institutions now request the SSN at first contact as required by other federal laws and assign their own unique number to each person to maintain the individual's privacy as required. Other laws require the SSN be associated with interest-bearing accounts, interest-paying loans, most public assistance programs, and state-issued identification, e.g. driver's licenses. To reduce the incidence of identity theft, several states have passed laws that require institutions using the SSN to assign their own identifier numbers to individuals, and prohibit them from using the SSN as a primary key.

== State-issued driver's license/ID card ==
A driver's license is issued by each state's department of motor vehicles (DMV), which is required to drive. Each state's DMV can also issue a state identity card, which does not contain any endorsements to operate vehicles and can be used as official identification where asked for or needed. Most states do not allow for one person to hold both a driver's license and a state identity card, with federal regulations prohibiting such for REAL ID-compliant driver's licenses and state identity cards.

In addition to verifying driving privileges, drivers' licenses are used to purchase automobile insurance or during a police traffic stop and serve as the primary form of identity for American adults. They are widely used by both government entities and private businesses to verify identity or age, such as in entering secure government facilities, boarding a commercial airliner, business transactions, or in the purchase of age-restricted items such as alcoholic beverages or cigarettes.

Drivers' licenses issued in any state are recognized as valid identity documents in all other states under a variety of legal principles like comity and the Full Faith and Credit Clause of the United States Constitution. However, if a person permanently moves to another state as a resident, state laws usually give a period of time, such as 60 days, in which a person must surrender his out-of-state license for the license of his new home state.

Driver's licenses include a gender marker, typically either "M" or "F". This has been changing in the early 21st century. As of September 2019, at least 14 states and the District of Columbia offer a third, gender-neutral option beyond "male" and "female" to serve people with nonbinary gender identities.

== Requirement to carry identification ==
There is no legal requirement that American residents must carry their licenses when not operating a vehicle. However, the U.S. Supreme Court ruled in Hiibel v. Sixth Judicial District Court of Nevada that states are permitted to require people to truthfully state their name when a police officer asks them, and more than half of the states (as well as the District of Columbia) have enacted some variant of stop and identify statutes requiring compliance with such police inquiries. In some states, such as California, failure to produce an identification document upon citation for any traffic infraction (such as riding a bicycle on the wrong side of a street) is sufficient justification for full custodial arrest.

== REAL ID Act ==
Prior to 2005, each state designed its own driver's license according to its own standards. In 2005, the U.S. Congress passed a bill known as the REAL ID Act, which established uniform standards for the design and content of state drivers' licenses and delegated authority to the Department of Homeland Security to implement and regulate compliance with the Act. One aspects of the Act involves requirements for linking of license and ID card databases.

== Passport and passport card ==
United States passports are issued by the U.S. Department of State. Applications for passports are most often filed at United States Postal Service offices or local county or municipal clerk's offices. For many years, passports were not required for U.S. citizens to re-enter from countries near the United States (including Canada, Mexico, Bermuda, and most Caribbean and Central American nations.) In light of this, and given the country's immense size and the great distances which the average citizen lives from an international border, passport possession in the United States had remained relatively low. Indeed, most Americans normally did not obtain passports or carry them regularly unless traveling abroad, and as of 2006, only 60 million (20% of Americans) had passports. As of 2011, approximately 37% of Americans have passports or passport cards.

However, in response to recommendations in the 9/11 Commission Report, the U.S. Department of Homeland Security now requires proof of citizenship for people entering the United States from neighboring countries. This requirement is known as the Western Hemisphere Travel Initiative, and was implemented in stages:

- On January 23, 2007, a passport, U.S. Coast Guard Merchant Mariner's Document, or NEXUS card became mandatory when re-entering from those locations when traveling by air, with a few exceptions.
- On January 31, 2008, officers at land and sea ports of entry stopped taking oral declarations of citizenship from travelers; all individuals entering the U.S. are now required to present documentary proof of identity and citizenship.
- Beginning July 1, 2009, people entering the United States by land or sea must present a passport, passport card, or other document proving citizenship or permanent resident status.

By law, an unexpired U.S. passport (or passport card) is conclusive proof of U.S. nationality (though not necessarily citizenship) and has the same force and effect as proof of United States nationality as certificates of naturalization or of citizenship, if issued to a U.S. citizen for the full period allowed by law.

=== Passport card ===
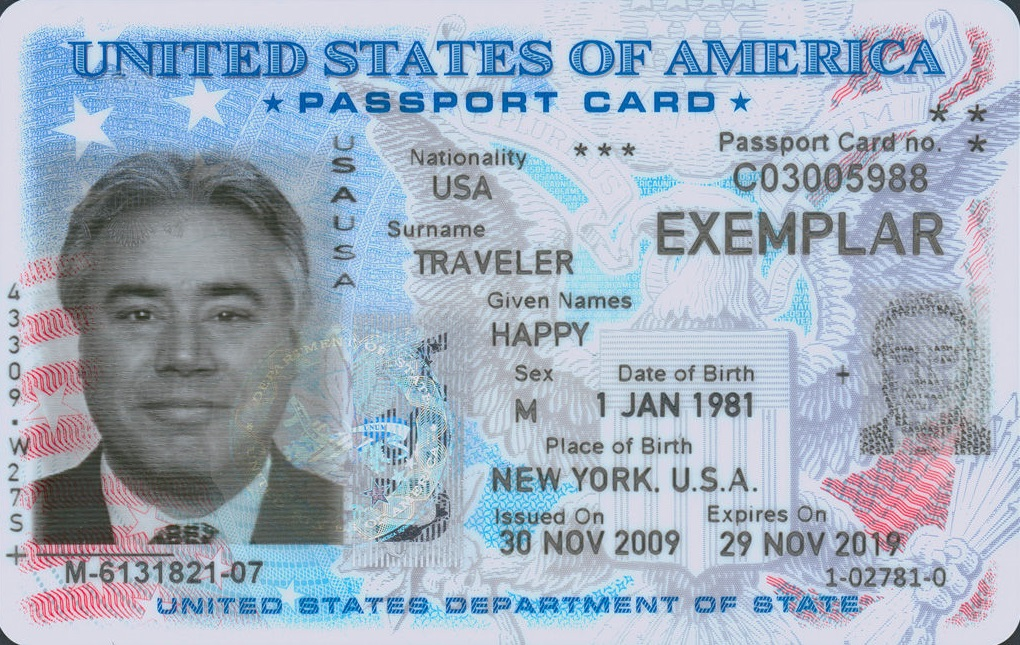
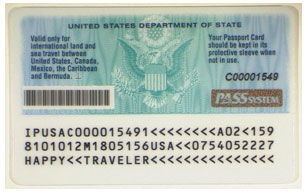
Front and back of a U.S. passport card.

The main purpose of the U.S. passport card is to provide a more convenient wallet-sized identity and citizenship document for citizens who want to carry an official federal ID and for those who live near a land border. It can be used for land and sea travel between the United States and Canada, Mexico, the Caribbean and Bermuda but cannot be used for other countries or for international air travel. Other than these travel limitations, the passport card carries the same rights and privileges as the passport book. The passport card is also accepted as valid identification for domestic air travel inside the United States.

When outside the United States and the above-mentioned countries, the passport card can be used as identification and proof of citizenship within a particular country, even though it is not valid for travel internationally (i.e., traveling from Germany to Switzerland/Austria/France/etc.).

U.S. Citizenship and Immigration Services has indicated that the U.S. passport card may be used in the Employment Eligibility Verification Form (also known as the I-9) process. The passport card is considered a "List A" document that may be presented by newly hired employees during the employment eligibility verification process to show work authorized status. "List A" documents are those used by employees to prove both identity and work authorization when completing the Form I-9.

== Department of Defense Identification Card ==
Members of the military and employees of the Department of Defense receive identity documents based on their status. A Geneva Conventions Identification Card (called a Common Access Card or CAC) is issued to Active Duty and Selected Reserve service members, DOD employees, and some contractors. Adult dependents of service members, retired service members, and members of the inactive ready reserve receive a different kind of military ID that does not contain the smart card cryptographic chip that the Common Access Card has.

A DOD identification card number usually matches the holder's Social Security Number. However, on June 1, 2011, the DOD began phasing out use of the SSN to protect service members' identities. It was replaced with a 10-digit DOD ID Number and a 12-digit Benefits ID Number.

== Immigration ==
Immigration and travel documents such as the Green Card or a visa can be used to prove identity and the right to work in the United States (if applicable)

The Immigration and Nationality Act of 1952 added Section 264(e), "Every alien, eighteen years of age and over, shall at all times carry with him and have in his personal possession any certificate of alien registration or alien registration receipt card issued to him pursuant to subsection (d). Any alien who fails to comply with the provisions of this subsection shall be guilty of a misdemeanor and shall upon conviction for each offense be fined not to exceed $100 or be imprisoned not more than thirty days, or both." Citing case laws, reliable authors, incl. those at American Jurisprudence, have written that there are probable causes to arrest immigrant who fails to produce the documentation by U.S. Immigration and Customs Enforcement unless proven otherwise.

== Other identity documents ==
In the absence of a national identity card, the typical adult in the United States often possesses a large number of documents issued by many different public and private entities to prove their identity.

For citizens who acquire United States citizenship not by virtue of being born in the United States, the federal government issues a Certificate of U.S. Citizenship or Certificate of Naturalization, which are documents that function similarly to a birth certificate. These two documents, along with a U.S. passport, are by law one of the few primary documents for proving U.S. citizenship. These certificates are normally not carried on a day-to-day basis; instead, they are used to procure other documents, such as a passport or driver's license, which are then carried and used as a primary means of identification.

The federal government also issues a variety of other documents and cards which can be used to establish identity. Trusted traveler cards are issued by US Customs and Border Protection to indicate participation in the NEXUS, SENTRI, or Global Entry programs used to facilitate expedited entry through customs. Within the marine trades (and supporting trades thereof), the Transportation Worker Identification Credential provides unescorted access to secured port facilitates.

Federal, state, and local governments and agencies typically issue identification cards for their employees. These cards can be used to prove identity outside of the workplace. Although there are varying degrees of acceptance, government workplace identification is generally seen as more trustworthy than workplace identification from a private company. A notable example is the Department of Defense's Common Access Card, which functions as the military's primary ID card.

There are a variety of secondary documents used to establish identity. However, these documents are typically not accepted as a primary form of identification. They are typically only used to obtain a primary form of identification (usually a driver's license or passport), when other forms of identification have been lost or stolen, or as auxiliary documents in conjunction with a primary form of identification. These other documents include:

- Access documents issued by private or governmental organizations, such as a press pass or a backstage pass
- Baptismal certificate
- City identification card
- Clinic, doctor or hospital record
- Credit cards and debit cards
- Day care or nursery school record
- Deed for ownership of real estate, which is often used as proof of residence or address.
- Divorce Decree
- Health insurance card issued by a private health insurance company, by Medicare, or by a government agency
- Hunting license
- Internal identification card issued by one's employer, university, or school
- Library card
- License documents issued by government organizations authorizing privileges other than driving, such as an amateur radio license, pilot's license, or concealed firearm permit
- Marriage certificate
- Massachusetts Liquor Identification Card (do not have to be a Massachusetts resident)
- Medical cannabis card
- Proof of automobile insurance card (when driving), renter's insurance, or homeowner's insurance
- Proof of professional certification (for members of regulated professions)
- School record or report card
- Utility bills, which are often used as proof of residence or address.
- Voter's registration card
- W-2 wage and tax statement

=== Membership ID ===
- Loyalty cards issued by private companies (supermarkets, warehouse club stores, etc.)
- Private associations identification
- Private clubs (social, athletic, educational, alumni, etc.)
- Professional organization identification

=== Native American Indian Documents ===
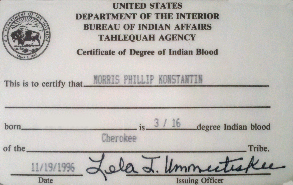
Certified Degree of Indian Blood Card issued by the United States Bureau of Indian Affairs, issued to Morris Phillip Konstantin (Phil Konstantin) on November 19, 1996. It lists him as 3/16th Cherokee Indian by blood (some personal information was burred out).

- Certificate of Indian Status (INAC) card
- Certificate of Degree of Indian Blood
- I-872 American Indian Card
- Indian Health Services eligibility/document
- Tribal enrollment documentation
- Tribal Membership Card
