= Viajero Confiable =

Mexican trusted traveler program

Programa Viajero Confiable (lit. 'Trusted Traveller Program') is a Mexican program which allows members to pass securely through customs and immigration controls in reduced time, by using automated border control systems at select airports. The program, part of the Western Hemisphere Travel Initiative (WHTI), was introduced in three airports in 2014 and has since expanded to additional sites.

== Description ==
Like the joint Canada/US NEXUS and the United States’ Global Entry and TSA PreCheck programs, Programa Viajero Confiable members traveling via participating airports may use designated lanes which allow them to speedily and securely clear customs, because the Mexican government has already performed a background check on them, and they are considered a trusted traveler. At the participating airports, members may use automated kiosks to scan their passport and fingerprints, and complete an electronic immigration form.

== Eligibility ==
The program is targeted at Mexican citizens, as well as U.S. or Canadian citizens who are members of the Global Entry or NEXUS program and are lawful permanent residents of Mexico, membership is valid for five years.

Applying for Programa Viajero Confiable comprises the following steps:

- For U.S. and Canadian citizens, be first an approved member of a U.S. TTP or Canadian Program (such as the two listed above)
- Apply online at the program website: https://www.gob.mx/inm/acciones-y-programas/viajero-confiable
- Submit the required payment (current MX$1372)
- After passing the background check and receiving provisional approval, choose a location for and schedule the required interview (the current locations include the airports and local offices at Cancun, Mexico City, and San Jose del Cabo)
- At the interview, have one's photograph, iris scan, fingerprints taken; verify submitted documentation; submit passport for inspection; and finalize the application for final review and approval.

== NEXUS eligibility ==
Mexican nationals in the Programa Viajero Confiable members may apply for NEXUS program membership. Similarly, NEXUS members from Canada and the USA may also apply to Programa Viajero Confiable, as may U.S. Citizens who are members of Global Entry.

== History ==
Programa Viajero Confiable was first introduced in three airports - Cancún International Airport, Mexico City International Airport, and Cabo San Lucas International Airport - in early 2014 but has since expanded to additional sites.

== See also ==
- Port Passenger Accelerated Service System (PORTPASS)
- Secure Electronic Network for Travelers Rapid Inspection (SENTRI)
