= Port Passenger Accelerated Service System =

The Port Passenger Accelerated Service System (PORTPASS) was a suite of programs of the former U.S. Immigration and Naturalization Service (INS), including:

- Immigration and Naturalization Service Passenger Accelerated Service System (INSPASS)
- Secure Electronic Network for Travelers Rapid Inspection (SENTRI)
- Videophone Inspection Program (VIP) and Outlying Area Reporting Station (OARS)
- Remote Video Inspection System (RVIS)

While SENTRI and the Videophone Inspection Program are still in operation, most of these programs have been superseded by the U.S. Department of Homeland Security (DHS) Western Hemisphere Travel Initiative programs, such as NEXUS (frequent traveller program) and Global Entry programs.
