= Trusted Traveler Programs =

Collection of initiatives managed by the U.S. Department of Homeland Security (DHS)

Trusted Traveler Programs (TTP) are initiatives managed by the U.S. Department of Homeland Security and its subordinate agencies, Customs and Border Protection (CBP) and Transportation Security Administration (TSA), to provide expedited security screening and border crossing for pre-approved, low-risk travelers.

== History ==
During the 1990s and early 2000s, the US Immigration and Naturalization Service operated INSPASS, a trusted traveler program designed to integrate with Canadian and European programs, at JFK and Newark Airports. INSPASS operated with a similar system, identifying travelers with their handprint. The program was discontinued in 2002 when the INS was merged with U.S. Customs to form U.S. Customs and Border Protection.

== Membership Cards ==
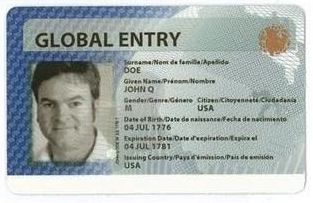
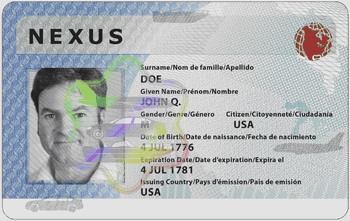
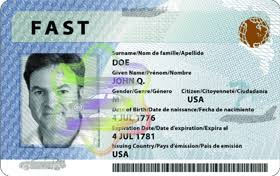
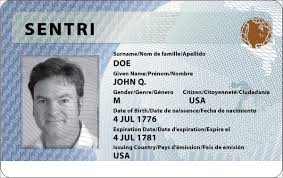
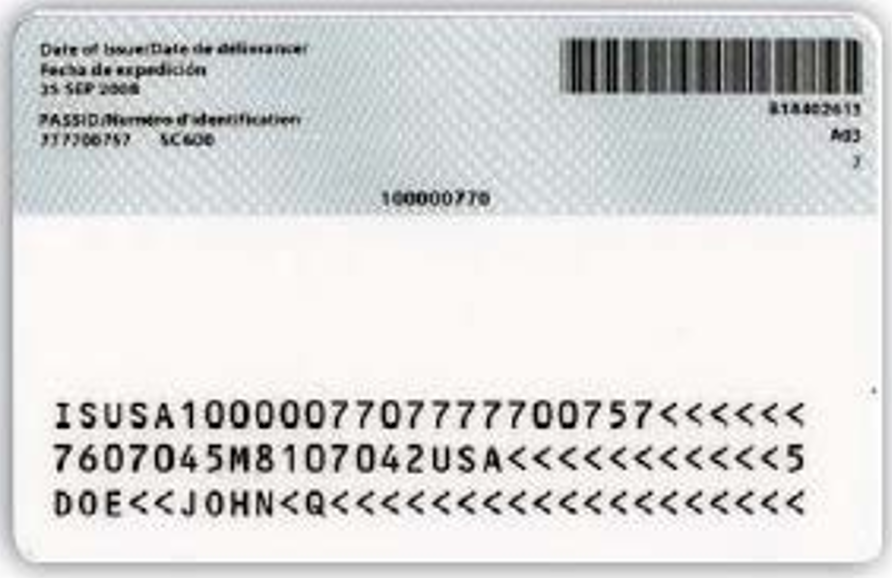
Membership cards of the Trusted Traveler Programs

== Types ==
Logos of different Trusted Traveler Programs

=== Active programs ===
==== Global Entry ====
Global Entry is a trusted traveller program of the U.S. Customs and Border Protection service that allows pre-approved, low-risk travelers to receive expedited clearance upon arrival into the United States through automatic kiosks at select airports and via designated lanes by land and sea. U.S. citizens, non-citizen nationals, and U.S. lawful permanent residents are eligible to apply for Global Entry. In addition, nationals of the countries that have reached agreements with the United States may also apply for this program. As of 2024, Global Entry was available at 62 U.S. airports and 14 non-U.S. airports with U.S. preclearance, and more than 12.7 million people were enrolled in the program.

==== NEXUS ====
NEXUS is another trusted traveller program operated jointly by the U.S. Customs and Border Protection and the Canada Border Services Agency that allows pre-approved, low-risk travelers to receive expedited clearance upon arrival into the United States and Canada by air, land, and water. The program is available to U.S. citizens, U.S. permanent residents, Canadian citizens, Canadian permanent residents, and Mexican nationals. Members of NEXUS can use the benefits of Global Entry if their fingerprints and passport information were collected during the interview to apply for the program.

==== SENTRI ====
SENTRI is similar to the NEXUS program, but it is fully operated by the U.S. Customs and Border Protection. It allows expedited entry to the United States at the Mexico–United States border for pre-approved travelers that are considered low-risk. U.S. citizens, U.S. permanent residents, and all foreign nationals are eligible for the program. U.S. citizens and U.S. permanent residents may use their SENTRI card at Global Entry kiosks. Mexican nationals who are SENTRI members may apply for Global Entry after passing a risk assessment conducted by the Mexican government.

==== TSA PreCheck ====
Members of Global Entry (along with members of other U.S. Trusted Traveler programs, NEXUS and SENTRI) may be selected to use TSA PreCheck on all participating airlines by entering their "Known Traveler Number" from their Global Entry card or dashboard into their flight reservation information or into their frequent flyer account. While any person, including TTP participants, may be subjected to standard or enhanced screening at any time (i.e., denied PreCheck), denying PreCheck to Global Entry members is rare. PreCheck is included for all Global Entry members, NEXUS members who are U.S. citizens, U.S. permanent residents or Canadian citizens, and SENTRI members who are U.S. citizens or U.S. permanent residents.
