= Form I-9 =

United States employment eligibility verification form

USCIS Form I-9, Employment Eligibility Verification (revised July 2017)

Form I-9, officially the Employment Eligibility Verification, is a United States Citizenship and Immigration Services form in existence since 1986. Mandated by the Immigration Reform and Control Act of 1986, it is used to verify the identity and legal authorization to work of all paid employees in the United States. All U.S. employers must ensure proper completion of Form I-9 for each individual they hire for employment in the United States.

== Requirements ==
The Immigration Reform and Control Act of 1986 (IRCA) required employers to verify that all newly hired employees presented facially valid documentation verifying the employee's identity and legal authorization to accept employment in the United States. The I-9 form, or more properly the Employment Eligibility Verification Form, is provided by the federal government for that purpose.

Every employee hired after November 6, 1986 must complete an I-9 form at the time of hire. Employees must complete Section 1 of the form upon commencing employment. The employer must complete Section 2 within three days of the employee's starting date at work. The employer is responsible for ensuring that the forms are completed properly and in a timely manner.

The I-9 is not required for unpaid volunteers or for contractors. However, a company could still find itself liable if it contracts work to a contractor it knows either is or employs unauthorized workers.

Multiple versions of Form I-9, Employment Eligibility Verification, have been issued since the form was first introduced in 1987; not all versions are valid for use. Currently, only forms showing the following revision date are valid: "Rev. 07/17/2017 N*".

If an employee cannot read or cannot write in English, a translator or preparer may complete the form and sign it on behalf of the employee. The form also requires the employee's own signature.

In October 2004, new legislation made it possible to complete the I-9 electronically.

=== Prerequisites for employees ===
In completing form I-9, prospective employees attest, under penalty of perjury, that they are in one of the following categories:

- A U.S. citizen,
- A U.S. non-citizen national,
- A lawful permanent resident or
- An alien authorized to work.

=== Documentation for proof of identity or employment authorization ===
With the form, prospective employees must provide documents that prove their eligibility to work. A variety of documents are acceptable. The prospective employee must provide either:

- One document that establishes both identity and employment eligibility (on List A on the I-9)
- One document that establishes identity (on List B) together with another document that establishes employment eligibility (on List C).

All documents must be unexpired

==== List A ====
Documents that may be used under "List A" of the I-9 form to establish both identity and employment eligibility include:

- An unexpired U.S. Passport,
- A U.S. Passport Card,
- A Permanent Resident Card (often called a "green card") or Alien Registration Receipt Card with photograph,
- An unexpired Temporary Resident Card,
- An unexpired foreign passport with an I-551 stamp, or with Form I-94 (For the certain alien who is authorized to work with restrictions. The person should also attach the documents which indicate an unexpired employment authorization.),
- An unexpired Employment Authorization Document issued by the United States Department of Homeland Security that includes a photograph (Form I-766) or
- An unexpired Employment Authorization Card.

==== List B ====
Documents that may be used under "List B" of the I-9 to establish identity include:

- Driver's license or identification card issued by a U.S. state or outlying possession of the U.S. provided it contains a photograph or identifying information such as name, date of birth, sex, height, eye color and address;
- Federal or state identification card provided it contains a photograph or identifying information such as name, date of birth, sex, height, eye color and address;
- School identification card with photograph;
- U.S. Armed Services identification card or draft record;
- Voter Registration Card;
- U.S. Coast Guard Merchant Mariner Card;
- Native American tribal document;
- Driver's license issued by a Canadian government authority or
- Trusted traveler documentation (Global Entry, NEXUS, SENTRI).

For individuals under the age of eighteen, the following documents may be used to establish identity:

- School record or report card;
- Clinic, doctor or hospital record or
- Daycare or nursery school record.

Employees who supply an item from List B (to establish identity) must also supply an item from List C (to establish employment eligibility).

==== List C ====
Documents that may be used under "List C" of the I-9 to establish employment eligibility include:

- A U.S. Social Security card issued by the Social Security Administration unless it indicates one of the following:
  - NOT VALID FOR EMPLOYMENT (generally issued to non-immigrant aliens unauthorized to work)
  - VALID FOR WORK ONLY WITH INS AUTHORIZATION
  - VALID FOR WORK ONLY WITH DHS AUTHORIZATION,
- A Certification of Report of Birth (DS-1350) or a Certification of Birth Abroad (FS-545) issued by the U.S. State Department,
- Original or certified copy of a birth certificate from the U.S. or an outlying possession of the U.S., bearing an official seal,
- A Certificate of U.S. Citizenship (Form N-560 or N-561),
- A Certificate of Naturalization (Form N-550 or N-570),
- Native American tribal document,
- U.S. Citizen ID Card (Form I-197),
- An ID Card for the use of a Resident Citizen in the United States (Form I-179),
- An unexpired employment authorization card issued by the Dept. of Homeland Security (other than those included on List A) or
- Consular Report of Birth Abroad (Form FS-240).

U.S. citizens who have lost their social security card can apply for a duplicate at the Social Security Administration.

Employees who supply an item from List C (to establish employment eligibility) must also supply an item from List B (to establish identity).

=== Reverification ===
Employers must update or reverify certain ID documents at or prior to their expiration date. This does not apply to already presented and accepted non-expired U.S. Passports or Permanent Resident Cards when they reach their expiration date, nor to any List B documents (e.g., state driver's licenses and state IDs). The USCIS website, in the Employer section, Employer Bulletins, lists the limited requirements and allowed instances for reverification.

For U.S. citizens, I-9s are valid continuously unless a break of more than a year of employment occurs. International employees on F-1 (student), H-1B (specialty occupation), or J-1 (exchange visitor) visas must have their I-9 reverified each time their visa has expired with a new work authorization permit (renewed visa with work authorization, EAD, Permanent Residence Card, etc.).

=== Retention ===
Employers must retain a Form I-9 for all current employees. Employers must also retain a Form I-9 for three years after the date of hire, or one year after the date employment ends, whichever is later. Employers must show their employees' I-9 form any time the immigration or labor authority requests it.

== Anti-discrimination provisions ==
The Immigration Reform and Control Act which introduced the requirement leading to the promulgation of the I-9 form also included anti-discrimination provisions. Under the Act, most U.S. citizens, permanent residents, temporary residents, asylees or refugees who are legally allowed to work in the United States cannot be discriminated against on the basis of national origin or citizenship status. This provision applies to employers of three or more workers and covers both hiring and termination decisions. In addition, an employer must accept any valid document or combination of documents specified in the I-9 form as long as the documents appear genuine.

For example, an employer could not refuse to hire a candidate because his I-9 revealed that he was a non-citizen (such as a permanent resident or a refugee) rather than a U.S. citizen. For this reason some immigration lawyers advise companies to avoid requiring an I-9 until a candidate is hired rather than risk a lawsuit. As another example, a company could not insist that an employee provide a passport rather than, say, a driver's license and social security card. Another anti-discrimination provision requires that employers must enforce I-9 compliance in a uniform manner. For example, an employer must not require some employees to complete an I-9 before being hired, but allow others to complete the form after starting employment.

Employers must not assume that the employee is unauthorized to work just because the individual either could not bring the proof of employment authorization or has brought the unaccepted documents until the start date of the employment. Instead, employers should encourage that employee to bring the acceptable documents which are under the List A, B and C. Employers may terminate the employment only if the employee cannot attest the person's work authorization by bringing the proof after the start date.

The Office of Special Counsel for Immigration-Related Unfair Employment Practices ("OSC") is a section within the Department of Justice's Civil Rights Division that enforces the anti-discrimination provision of the Immigration and Nationality Act ("INA"). The OSC can help workers by calling employers and explaining proper verification practices and, when necessary, by providing victims of discrimination with charge forms. Upon receipt of a charge of discrimination, OSC investigations typically take no longer than seven months. Victims may obtain various types of relief including job relief and back pay.

OSC also has an extensive outreach program. It provides staff to speak at outreach events throughout the country, and has free informational brochures, posters and tapes for distribution.

=== Types of discrimination ===
The OSC investigates the following types of discriminatory conduct under the anti-discrimination provision of the Immigration and Nationality Act (INA), 8 U.S.C. § 1324b:

==== Citizenship or immigration status discrimination ====
With respect to hiring, firing, recruitment or referral for a fee by employers with four or more employees, employers may not treat individuals differently because they are or are not U.S. citizens or work-authorized individuals. U.S. citizens, recent permanent residents, temporary residents, asylees and refugees are protected from citizenship status discrimination. However, permanent residents who do not apply for naturalization within six months of eligibility are not protected from citizenship status discrimination. Citizenship status discrimination which is otherwise required to comply with law, regulation, executive order or government contract is permissible by law.

==== National origin discrimination ====
With respect to hiring, firing, recruitment or referral for a fee by employers with more than three and fewer than fifteen employees, employers may not treat individuals differently because of their place of birth, country of origin, ancestry, native language, accent or because they are perceived as looking or sounding foreign. All U.S. citizens, lawful permanent residents and work authorized individuals are protected from national origin discrimination. The Equal Employment Opportunity Commission has jurisdiction over employers with fifteen or more employees.

==== Unfair documentary practices ====
Relating to verifying the employment eligibility of employees, employers may not request more or different documents than are required to verify employment eligibility, reject reasonably genuine-looking documents or specify certain documents over others with the purpose or intent of discriminating on the basis of citizenship status or national origin. U.S. citizens and all work authorized individuals are protected from document abuse.

==== Retaliation ====
Individuals who file charges with OSC; who cooperate with an OSC investigation; who contest action that may constitute unfair documentary practices or discrimination based upon citizenship, immigration status, or national origin; or who assert their rights under the INA's anti-discrimination provision are protected from retaliation.

== Penalties ==
The IRCA includes penalties for I-9 noncompliance. Federal law provides for imprisonment or fines for making false statements or using false documents in connection with the completion of the I-9. An employer who hires an unauthorized worker can be fined between $250 and $5,500 per worker. In addition, such an employer can be barred from federal government contracts for a year. An employee who knowingly accepts fraudulent documentation can also be criminally prosecuted under other immigration laws.

An employer who fails to keep proper records that I-9s are properly filed can be fined $110 per missing item for each form, up to $1100 per form, even if the employee is legally authorized to work in the United States. Since 2009, Immigration & Customs Enforcement (ICE) has conducted over 7,500 audits and imposed over $80 million in fines. In 2011 alone, ICE conducted 2,740 audits and assessed over $7 million in fines.

An individual who knowingly commits or participates in document fraud may be fined between $375 and $3,200 per document for the first offense and between $3,200 and $6,500 per document for subsequent offenses.

== See also ==
- Immigration to the United States
- E-Verify
