= FLUX Alliance =

International travel program

FLUX Alliance (Fast Low Risk Universal Crossing) was an intergovernmental program to allow for efficient movement of frequent travellers across international borders of participating countries. The program ended January 1, 2017. Applicants to the program are evaluated in interviews by US Customs and Border Control and Dutch authorities, a security threat assessment is carried out, and biometric information is collected including fingerprints and eye imaging.

Similar to the NEXUS agreement between the US and Canada which coordinates their Global Entry and CANPASS Air programs, FLUX coordinates between the US Global Entry and Netherlands Privium programs. It is envisioned to include other countries as well; Canada has voiced interest as well as Germany, the United Kingdom, and Japan.

FLUX Alliance receives financial support from the European External Borders Fund Grenzeloze mogelijkheden.

The Flux Alliance programme was ended for Netherlands citizens on 01 January 2017 and will be replaced by the Registered Traveller Program Nederland.
