= Smart Border Declaration =

US–Canada border agreement

The Smart Border Declaration is a binational agreement signed on December 12, 2001, between the United States and Canada. The agreement aimed to continually improve border security, information sharing, infrastructure protection, and law enforcement co-operation between the two nations. Many of the innovations that have become common worldwide were pioneered with the Smart Border initiative, including cargo and passenger preclearance, the NEXUS trusted traveller program, and joint policing missions on cross-border threats.

== Background ==
Following the 11 September 2001 attacks, the U.S. declared a "level one" alert at its borders, which required intrusive inspections of all crossing vehicles and passengers. Within a day, backups had grown to 15 hours at the border between Windsor and Detroit, and U.S.-bound semi-trailer trucks, many carrying Canadian-made auto parts to American factories, formed queues dozens of kilometers long. After two days, car plants in Ontario and the U.S. Midwest were shutting down as needed parts failed to arrive on time. The Canadian ambassador, Michael Kergin, working with Andy Card, the chief of staff under President George W. Bush, started a process to lessen border congestion.

In the weeks after 9/11, Canada's Chrétien government persuaded the Bush administration to work together to make the Canada-U.S. border both more secure and less of an impediment for high-value goods and low-risk travellers. The objective was to make both countries safer while making mutual trade easier through closer cooperation on security issues. Former Pennsylvania Governor and head of the U.S. Department of Homeland Security, Tom Ridge, and Canadian Foreign Affairs minister John Manley "got along extremely well" as they put together a plan. The result was the Smart Border Declaration signed on 12 December 2001. The Declaration included a four-part Action Plan. Within a year, it was expanded into a 30-point Action Plan.

== Features ==
The Smart Border Declaration and the associated 30-Point Action Plan to Enhance the Security of Our Shared Border While Facilitating the Legitimate Flow of People and Goods had four pillars: the secure flow of people; the secure flow of goods; secure infrastructure; and information sharing and coordination on the enforcement of these objectives. It promised quick action to produce a new high-tech clearance system to expedite and streamline commercial and business travel, while fortifying security.

In the agreement, Canada and the United States pledged to share passenger lists on flights between the two countries and to develop an integrated approach for processing truck, rail, and marine cargo away from the border. The program led to dedicated shipping lanes, and pre-screening systems for cargo that became commonplace for transport between Canada and the U.S.

The NEXUS program was introduced whereby individuals are deemed to be "trusted travelers" after vetting by Canadian and American officials. Similarly, the Free and Secure Trade (FAST) program (open to truck drivers from the United States, Canada, and Mexico) makes cross-border commercial shipments simpler and quicker. The programs leave authorities with more time and personnel to devote to less-trusted travellers and shipments.

== Later related initiatives ==
President Obama and Prime Minister Harper announced the Declaration of a Shared Vision for Perimeter Security and Economic Competitiveness on 4 February 2011, and on 7 December 2011 they released the Beyond the Border Action Plan. The plan provided a formal mechanism to strengthen border cooperation. It had initiatives in four areas: Addressing Threats Early; Trade Facilitation, Economic Growth and Jobs; Cross-Border Law Enforcement; and Critical Infrastructure and Cyber Security. The Beyond the Border plan lapsed in 2017 under the Trump and Trudeau administrations.

The cooperation established by the Smart Border initiative made it easier to restrict border traffic in 2020 during the COVID-19 pandemic. Canada and the U.S. worked together to keep cross-border goods trade flowing, largely by exempting truck, rail, and air freight workers from most public health restrictions. However, the rules for discretionary travel, like vacations, were not harmonized. In late 2024, the idea of a North American border-security perimeter re-emerged as a way Canada could respond to President-elect Donald Trump's concerns about illegal migrants and drugs crossing the U.S.-Canada border.

Researchers at the U.S.-based Border Policy Research Institute say the border is likely to become less secure if the cooperation started with the Smart Border initiative is abandoned. Some sort of permanent oversight presence within the U.S. government, such as an expert panel or a commission, would help to keep border issues at the forefront of policy decisions and could ensure matters are dealt with more deliberately and efficiently.

== See also ==
- Free and Secure Trade (FAST) program
- NEXUS program
