= TSA PreCheck =

US trusted traveller program

TSA PreCheck logo

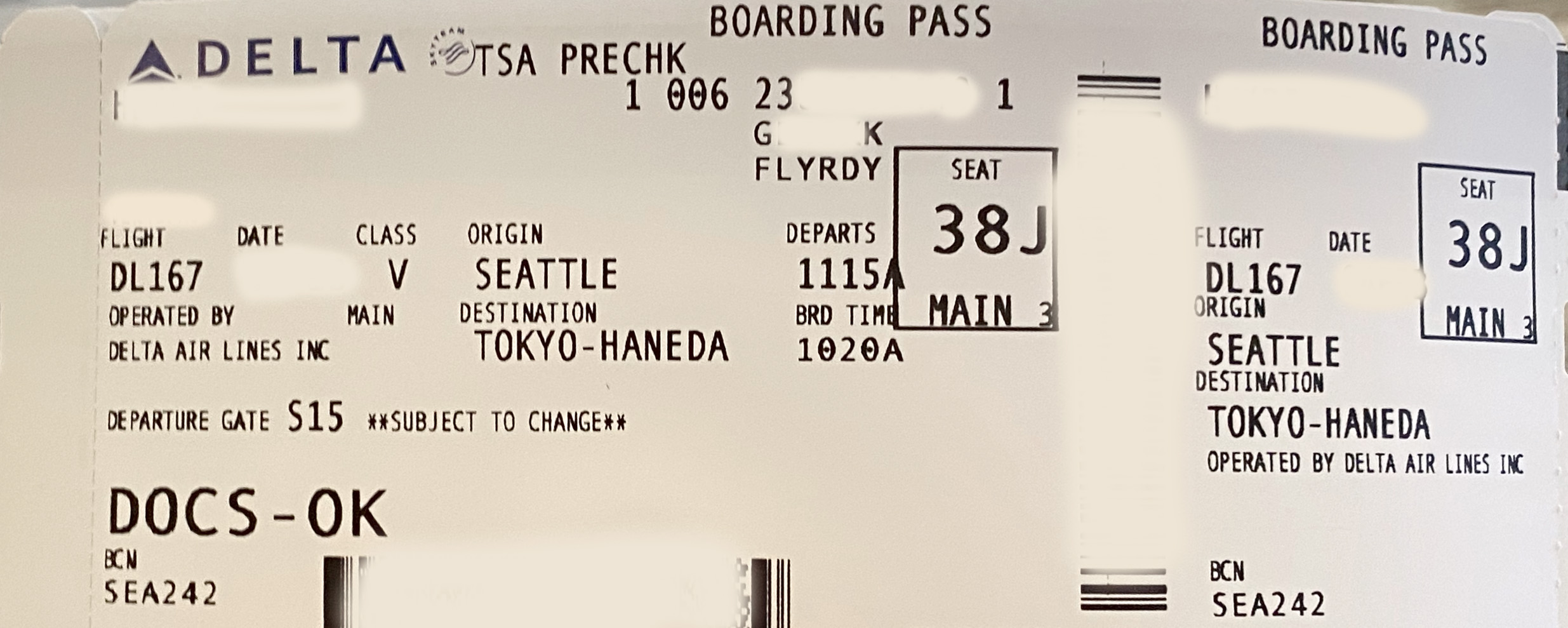
A boarding pass with the TSA Precheck endorsement

TSA PreCheck is a trusted traveler program that allows some people to receive expedited security screening at airports in the United States.

The program, branded as TSA Pre✓, was initiated in December 2013 and is administered (except for enrollment) by the United States Transportation Security Administration.

Travelers who can take advantage of TSA PreCheck are members of certain frequent flyer programs, members of Global Entry, Free and Secure Trade, NEXUS, and SENTRI, members of the U.S. Military, and cadets and midshipmen of the United States service academies It works for traveling on domestic itineraries and some international ones.

As of August 2026, 97 airlines participate in the program, which is available at more than 200 airports.

== History ==
In October 2011, the TSA announced the introduction of a new pilot program called "TSA PreCheck" with the goal of offering expedited security for a limited number of low-risk frequent flyers with American Airlines, and Delta Air Lines as well as travelers enrolled in any of the U.S. Customs and Border Protection's (CBP's) Trusted Traveler Programs. Passengers wishing to participate in this program were prompted by their airline or program to opt in or remain opted out. Passengers who opted in would then need to provide additional personal information and identification. If accepted, the passenger would be directed to a separate, designated lane at airport security when flying. At the time, the only airports offering the pilot program were Atlanta, Detroit Metro, Miami, and Dallas/Fort Worth, with only one security checkpoint at each offering the service. TSA's administrator also commented that TSA wanted to move from a "one size fits all" approach to a more risk-based system for screening while maintaining the effectiveness of their security efforts.

In February 2012, the TSA announced the expansion of the PreCheck program to passengers traveling with US Airways, United Airlines, and Alaska Airlines. Citing agency recognition that the majority of travelers pose no security threat, the expansion broadened expedited screening from the initial four pilot locations to nearly 30 major U.S. airports, including Denver, Chicago O’Hare, San Francisco, and New York JFK. They also announced their goal to continue expanding PreCheck to additional airlines once they can operationally handle it.

In December 2013, the TSA opened its first dedicated in-person PreCheck enrollment center at Indianapolis International Airport, with plans to expand to more than 300 application centers nationwide in the coming years. Passengers wishing to enroll could visit the TSA's website to pre-enroll before scheduling an appointment at the in-person enrollment center. After completing their appointment, the TSA would make a final decision on their application and would issue them a Known Traveler Number (KTN) to access PreCheck lanes in the future. Previously, the eligibility of the program was limited and inconsistent; only certain members of participating airlines were eligible and their eligibility would be determined on a per-flight basis.

== Enrollment ==
After completing a background check, being fingerprinted, and paying a fee ranging from $76.75 to $85.00 depending on the provider, travelers receive a Known Traveler Number (KTN). Unlike other trusted travel programs, whose enrollment is managed by the US government, the enrollment of TSA PreCheck is managed by three commercial companies: CLEAR, IDEMIA and Telos. The TSA does not issue an ID card like Global Entry, NEXUS, and SENTRI do. Travelers are notified if they have PreCheck by having an indicator printed on their boarding pass that may say "TSAPRECHK", "TSA PRE", or "TSA Pre✓®" depending on the airline and type of boarding pass.

== Touchless ID ==
TSA PreCheck Touchless ID logo and boarding pass eligibility indicator

TSA PreCheck Touchless ID (formerly known as Delta Digital ID) is an experimental and optional facial recognition technology used by only a few select airlines at a small number of checkpoints at major domestic hubs.

The program uses biometric cameras to compare a traveler's live image against the passport photo associated with their enrollment, allowing eligible passengers to verify their identity without presenting a physical ID or paper boarding pass. However, passengers are still required to carry an acceptable physical photo ID in the event manual identity verification is necessary.

=== Enrollment ===
Travelers must be active TSA PreCheck members, have a valid U.S. passport saved to Google Wallet or your airline profile (Note: Using Google Wallet without an airline profile is subject to the same airline restrictions and cannot be used on non-participating airlines.), and opt in before checking in. Once opted in, a Touchless ID indicator is displayed on the passenger's mobile boarding pass. As of 2026, only six major U.S. carriers offer Touchless ID: Alaska Airlines, American Airlines, Delta Air Lines, Hawaiian Airlines, Southwest Airlines, and United Airlines.

=== Privacy ===
Biometric data collected for Touchless ID is retained for a maximum of 24 hours after flight departure, and federal policy prohibits its use for law enforcement, surveillance, or external data sharing except for limited testing to evaluate the accuracy of TSA's facial comparison technology. These tests are conducted only at select locations with advance passenger notification. TSA secures all personal data and images used or temporarily stored by its facial comparison technology, and all systems comply with DHS and TSA cybersecurity requirements.

== Policies and Reception ==
The program has led to complaints of unfairness and longer wait lines. The TSA says that PreCheck is not guaranteed on every flight, as passengers are subject to random exclusions. Furthermore, passengers may be disqualified or suspended from PreCheck for violations of federal transportation security regulations. The TSA maintains a list of credit card issuers and loyalty programs that reimburse members' TSA PreCheck or Global Entry application fees.

== Children and Minors ==
Citing high travel demand, the TSA announced in May 2023 that children aged between 13 and 17 would be able to accompany a parent or guardian through the PreCheck security lines as long as they are all under the same reservation, and the parent or guardian has PreCheck linked on their reservation. Previously, this rule applied only to children 12 and under.
