= McAllen–Hidalgo–Reynosa International Bridge =

Road bridge crossing the Rio Grande between northeastern Mexico and Texas

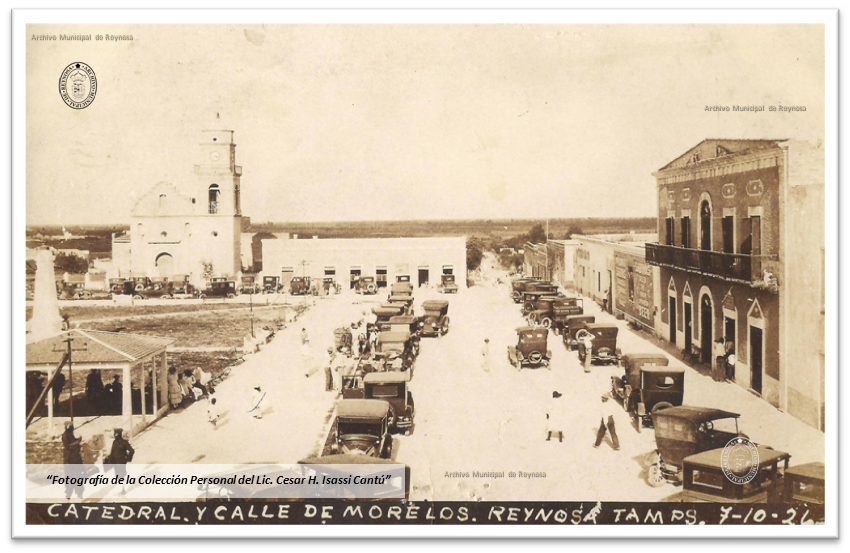
- Bridge's opening day celebration on 10 July 1926 in the plaza of Reynosa, Mexico.
- Coordinates: 26°05′42″N 98°16′17″W
- Crosses: Rio Grande, Mexico–United States border
- Locale: McAllen−Hidalgo, Texas, United States; Reynosa, Tamaulipas state, Mexico

Characteristics
- No. of spans: 2

History
- Opened: 1926

Location
- Interactive map of McAllen–Hidalgo–Reynosa International Bridge

The McAllen–Hidalgo International Bridge is a road bridge crossing the Rio Grande between the state of Tamaulipas in northeastern Mexico and the state of Texas in the southwestern United States.

== History ==
Prior to 1926, primitive ferry service existed between the cities via rowboat.

The McAllen–Hidalgo–Reynosa International Bridge was the first connecting the cities of Hidalgo and Reynosa, and was built in 1926.

As of 2015, the bridge includes two different structures, one for southbound traffic to Reynosa in Tamaulipas, Mexico and one for northbound traffic to McAllen, Texas, United States. The four-lane southbound structure is 524 in length and was completed in 1965. The four-lane northbound structures is 852 length and was completed in 1987.

== Route ==
The Hidalgo Texas Port of Entry is associated with the bridge that connects the cities of Hidalgo and McAllen in Texas to the city of Reynosa in Tamaulipas.

The road bridge has two spans, north and south bound, of four lanes each. This bridge has a SENTRI Lane.

=== Jurisdictions ===
As of 2015, the bridge is under the administration of the City of McAllen and the US and the federal government of Mexico on the south port of entry, though its US location is in Hidalgo, Texas, Hidalgo County, Texas, within the Pharr District of the Texas Department of Transportation.

Crossing the bridge north into Texas can take up to 1–2 hours, as the U.S. border agents stop all vehicles and the lines can be very long. Recently a Secure Electronic Network for Travelers Rapid Inspection−SENTRI lane was designated, which for an extra yearly fee shortens the U.S. entry time from Mexico.

Crossing the bridge south into Tamaulipas is generally quicker, as the Mexican border agents usually check few incoming vehicles. In 2025 the federal government of Mexico made a Guardia Nacional (Mexico) post making lines be 2 to 3 and a half hours (sometimes 5 hours).

Since 1996, all northbound trucks are required to use the Pharr–Reynosa International Bridge to enter the U.S.

== Border crossing ==
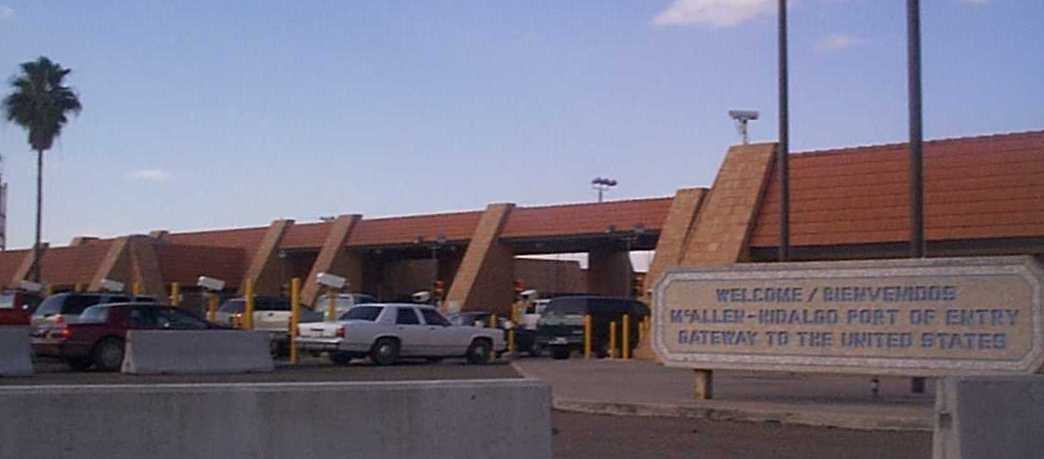
Hidalgo Texas Border Inspection Station 2000

The Hidalgo Texas Port of Entry is located at the northern end of the McAllen–Hidalgo–Reynosa International Bridge, in the city of Hidalgo. The northbound traffic is coming from the city of Reynosa. Since 1996, all northbound trucks are required to use the Pharr–Reynosa International Bridge to enter the U.S. from Reynosa.

== See also ==
- Anzalduas International Bridge — next Reynosa + McAllen road bridge upriver-west.
- Pharr-Reynosa International Bridge — 2nd downriver between the cities, for trucks.
- Bridges over the Rio Grande
- Tamaulipas–United States bridges
- List of international bridges in North America
