= Anzalduas International Bridge =

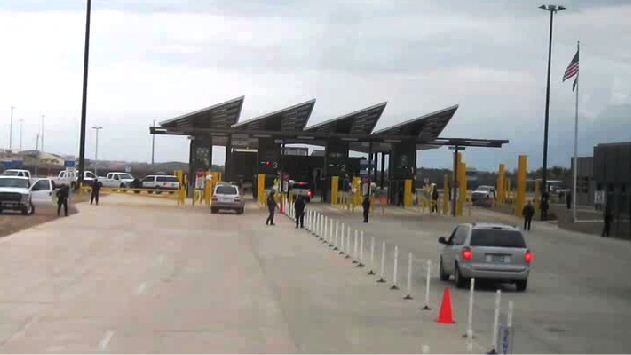
- Anzalduas Border Inspection Station, 2009
- Coordinates: 26.1165°N 98.3183°W
- Crosses: Rio Grande, Mexico—U.S. border
- Locale: Mission, Texas, United States; Reynosa, Tamaulipas state, Mexico
- Website: www.cbp.gov/contact/ports/hidalgo

History
- Opened: December 15, 2009; 16 years ago

Location
- Interactive map of Anzalduas International Bridge

Anzalduas International Bridge is an international bridge over the Rio Grande, which connects the western outskirts of both the city of Mission, Texas in the United States and the city of Reynosa, Tamaulipas state, in Mexico.

It provides cross-border commuters with two southbound and northbound lanes, as well as a pedestrian crossing.

The bridge opened on December 15, 2009. It is over three miles long and cost over $28 million to build.

== Bridge data ==
- Constructed by: Williams Brothers Construction
- Ground broke June 12, 2007
- Opened for business on December 15, 2009
- Construction cost: $28,493,593.70
- Four entrance lanes, including a SENTRI lane in the United States
- Bridge spans 3.2 miles (5.1 km)
- Has two safety bump-out spaces, and a pedestrian walkway, with lanes elevated to preserve nearby U.S. Fish and Wildlife Refuge
- Hours of operation: 6 am to 10 pm, daily

== Border crossing ==
The Anzalduas Port of Entry opened on December 15, 2009 with the completion of the Anzalduas International Bridge. It was designed to divert traffic from the congested Hidalgo Texas Port of Entry.

The presidential permit under which the bridge was constructed prohibited commercial traffic from using it until 2015, or when the Hidalgo Port of Entry averages more than 15,000 commercial entries per week. Commercial trucks and pedestrians continue to be prohibited from entering the US via this crossing; however, empty trucks may travel southbound to Mexico. The bridge has a dedicated commuter lane (SENTRI) that is open on restricted hours and frequently open to the general public during high traffic hours without notice.

== See also ==
- McAllen–Hidalgo–Reynosa International Bridge — next downriver between the cities.
- Pharr–Reynosa International Bridge — 2nd downriver between the cities, for trucks.
- Bridges over the Rio Grande
- Tamaulipas–United States bridges
- List of international bridges in North America
