= Pharr–Reynosa International Bridge =

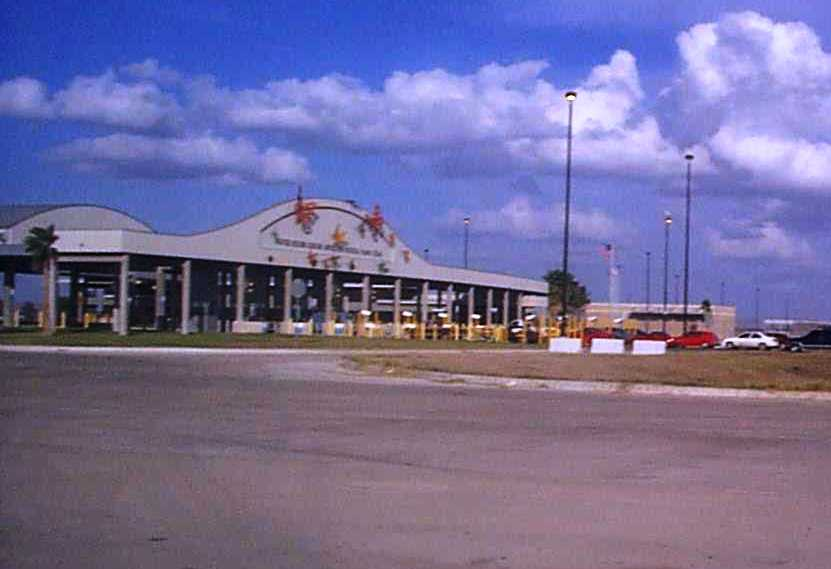
- Pharr Texas Border Inspection Station
- Coordinates: 26°04′N 98°13′W
- Crosses: Rio Grande, U.S.–Mexico border
- Locale: Pharr, Texas–Reynosa, Tamaulipas
- Other name: Pharr Texas Port of Entry
- Owner: City of Pharr; Government of Mexico

Characteristics
- Total length: 15,770 feet (4,810 m)
- Width: 4 lanes (3 northbound, 1 southbound)

History
- Opened: 1994

Location
- Interactive map of Pharr–Reynosa International Bridge

The Pharr–Reynosa International Bridge (Spanish: Puente Internacional Reynosa–Pharr) is an international bridge across the Rio Grande, along the U.S.–Mexico border. It connects the city of Pharr in the U.S. state of Texas with the city of Reynosa in the Mexican state of Tamaulipas. On the U.S. side, the bridge connects to U.S. Route 281 via Texas State Highway Spur 600. On the Mexico side, it provides access to Mexican Federal Highway 2. The bridge handles both commercial and passenger vehicles. Since 1996, all trucks have been diverted here from the McAllen–Hidalgo–Reynosa International Bridge, which is located upriver to the west.

== Border crossing ==
The Pharr Texas Port of Entry is located at the bridge. The tolling operation on the US side of the bridge is operated by the city of Pharr, Texas. The bridge opened in 1994, and since 1996, northbound trucks from Reynosa have not been to permitted to cross at the Hidalgo Texas Port of Entry. This has made Pharr a major commercial port of entry. It also has SENTRI lanes.

== See also ==
- Anzalduas International Bridge — next Reynosa + McAllen road bridge upriver-west.
- McAllen–Hidalgo–Reynosa International Bridge — next downriver between the cities.
- Bridges over the Rio Grande
- Tamaulipas–United States bridges
- List of international bridges in North America
- List of Mexico–United States border crossings
