= J-BIS =

Immigration control system

The J-BIS Biounit is an immigration control system that was introduced into Japanese airports. It is a machine that is located at the immigration booth. When a person who wishes to enter the country and applies for disembarkation, fingerprints of both index fingers are collected along with a photograph. At the same time, the person is checked against immigration office lists, and criminals, people who were previously deported, and other punished foreigners are prevented from entering the country. On November 20, 2007, Narita Airport, Kansai International Airport, and Chūbu Centrair International Airport had the system, with plans to roll out the system to the 27 airports and 126 harbors in the country.

== Summary ==
Until the start of J-BIS, when people would land in Japan and apply for entry, it was difficult to tell which people had changed their names or used special names on their passports, had been deported, or had criminal records. After the events of 9/11, Japan amended its Immigration Control and Refugee Recognition Act.

On November 20, 2007, the changes to the act went into effect. Most foreigners (everyone except special permanent residents, diplomats, people who were invited by the government, and people under the age of 16) were now required to have fingerprints taken from their two index fingers, as well as a photograph. The J-BIS system was the second system of its type enacted in the world; the first was the United States's US-VISIT system.

The fingerprint scans and photographs are transferred from the airport to the immigration office's servers, and this information is compared against a blacklist in around five seconds.

This list is a collection of Interpol information and around 14,000 people that have been searched by Japanese police, as well as the fingerprints and pictures that were recorded from around 800,000 foreigners who were deported from Japan. According to the immigration office, it is predicted that 0.001% of people who enter Japan appear on the blacklist.

Since the introduction of the system, 846 people were received exclusion orders by immigration authorities and 8 people were arrested for fabricating their fingerprints. The Japan Coast Guard also reported that the number of smugglers crossing the Korea Strait from the Korean Peninsula has increased rapidly.

== Procedure for entering the country under J-BIS ==
For people who apply to enter the country, they stand in front of the J-BIS machine at the immigration booth. They follow the instructions displayed on a monitor, and put both fingers on a glass pane, and after their fingerprints are scanned (it takes about 1 second) they hear a chime. Next, the terminal screen changes, and after a few seconds, their picture is taken by a camera mounted above the screen.

== Controversy ==
- For permanent residents other than special permanent residents, as well as foreigners who are married to Japanese, even if they can validate that they have permanent residences in Japan and are living in the country, if they temporarily go abroad and come back to Japan and need to use this system, some of them will be rejected.
- For foreigners who have family or homes in Japan, if they reject fingerprints or photographs on the basis of faith or ideology, even if they have no country to which they can return, they are refused entry.
- As J-BIS and US-VISIT are very similar, there is a question about the American government and the company who developed the system are planning to improve the system. The information collected by both systems is shared; there are no other systems like this in use.
- There is concern that the Japanese system, previously an internal legacy system created by Hitachi, will be reformed by Accenture Japan. A bid was accepted to do this for the low price of 100,000 yen. Such a low price has caused controversy since the system is so massive; similarly, transmitting such sensitive data to a "stateless corporation" in Bermuda has been questioned by officials.

== Automated gate ==
Along with the introduction of J-BIS, an "Automated gate" (自動化ゲート) was set up at Terminal 1 and 2 at Narita Airport, Haneda Airport, Chubu Centrair Airport and Kansai Airport. With this system, when a person enters or leaves the country, rather than having to be processed by an examiner there, a person can use a machine at the gate, thereby making both entry and departure simpler and easier, as well as more convenient. Japanese people with valid passports, foreigners with both valid passports (this includes refugees with valid travel certificates and re-entry permits) and re-entry permits can use this system.

Automated immigration at Narita Airport.

The gate works by holding up the identification page of the passport up to the terminal in front of the transparent booth, and the entrance to the booth will open. Inside the booth, there is an equipment to read fingerprints, where prints from two fingers are taken. After confirmation, if the person is confirmed to be him or herself, the exit gate will open. Although there is a worker sitting at the gate, according to the Ministry of Justice immigration office's information guide to the automated gates, most Japanese should be able to use the automated gate. When the automated gate is used, the entry/departure stamp is not affixed to one's passport. When a seal is needed, officials are available near the gate to affix the seal; alternatively, one can use the regular gate.

When one wants to use the gate, a person must register beforehand. For details, see the Ministry of Justice immigration office's information guide. For this advance registration, Japanese people (those who hold Japanese passports), only fingerprints are needed (not an image), as the automated gate does not take a picture.

== See also ==
- US-VISIT
- Narita Airport
