= Western Hemisphere Travel Initiative =

Passport requirement for entry into the US from select countries of the Americas

Western Hemisphere Travel Initiative logo

The Western Hemisphere Travel Initiative (WHTI) is the implementation of a requirement to show a passport or other acceptable document to enter the United States, for nationals of certain North American jurisdictions who were previously exempt from it when traveling within the Americas. The requirement comes from the Intelligence Reform and Terrorism Prevention Act, enacted in 2004 in response to the terrorist attacks of September 11, 2001, and implemented in phases between 2007 and 2009. According to the United States Department of Homeland Security, the purpose is to strengthen border security and facilitate entry into the United States for both U.S. citizens and foreign visitors.

== History ==
Passports were required for travel to the United States during the American Civil War, World War I, and continuously since 1941. However, exemptions from the passport requirement existed for travel within the Americas by nationals of some North American jurisdictions. Before 2007, to enter the United States from other parts of the Americas except Cuba, citizens of the United States, Canada and Bermuda were allowed to present any evidence of their citizenship, including merely an oral declaration. Nationals of Mexico could present a Border Crossing Card when arriving from Mexico or Canada. These exemptions applied to travel by any means of transportation.

In 2004, the Intelligence Reform and Terrorism Prevention Act was enacted in response to the terrorist attacks of September 11, 2001. Section 7209 of that law required that U.S. citizens, as well as nationals of neighboring jurisdictions who had been previously exempted from the passport requirement, present a passport or other document specified by the U.S. Department of Homeland Security to enter the United States. The law set a deadline of January 1, 2008 for the new requirement to take effect. In 2006, the Department of Homeland Security Appropriations Act, 2007 postponed this deadline to June 1, 2009.

The implementation of the new requirement was named the Western Hemisphere Travel Initiative (WHTI) and was done in phases. In the first phase, effective January 23, 2007, nationals of the United States, Canada, Bermuda and Mexico became required to present a passport to enter the United States by air from the Americas. The regulations retained exceptions for U.S. and Canadian citizens with a NEXUS card, and for members of the U.S. military and U.S. Merchant Marine.

Effective January 31, 2008, oral declarations were no longer accepted as evidence of citizenship. Citizens of the United States, Canada and Bermuda became required to present some document establishing their identity and citizenship to enter the United States by land or sea.

The second phase of the WHTI applied the passport requirement also for entry by land or sea from the Americas, effective June 1, 2009. The regulations again provided some exceptions. For entry by land or sea, in addition to the documents acceptable for entry by air, U.S. citizens could present a passport card, which was developed specifically for this purpose, with a lower cost and smaller size; and U.S. and Canadian citizens could present an enhanced driver's license or a trusted traveler card (FAST or SENTRI). For nationals of Mexico, entry with only a Border Crossing Card became restricted to travel from Mexico by land, pleasure vessel or ferry. Other exceptions were made for cruise ship passengers, children, Native Americans, and emergencies.

The WHTI did not affect the existing passport requirement for entry to the United States from outside the Americas, or for nationals other than of the United States, Canada, Bermuda and Mexico. It also did not affect the passport exemption for holders of a U.S. permanent resident card or similar immigration document, or for travel between the United States and its territories.

== Implementation ==
As a result of the WHTI, combined with previously existing requirements and subsequent changes, travelers must present one of the following documents when entering or departing the United States by air, or entering the United States by sea from outside the Americas:

- U.S. passport
- Foreign passport, with a U.S. visa if required
- U.S. permanent resident card (Form I-551), temporary I-551 stamp, re-entry permit (Form I-327), refugee travel document (Form I-571), advance parole authorization (Form I-512), temporary protected status document (Form I-512T), or employment authorization document (Form I-766) annotated "valid for re-entry to U.S." or "serves as I-512 advance parole"
- U.S. military or NATO identification with official travel order
- U.S. merchant mariner credential indicating U.S. citizenship
- NEXUS card indicating U.S. or Canadian citizenship (only to or from Canadian airports with preclearance)
- U.S. government-issued transportation letter or boarding foil (for entry only)
- Foreign emergency travel document or U.S. removal order (for departure only)

For entry by land or sea from the Americas, travelers must present one of the documents acceptable for entry by air or one of the following:

- U.S. passport card
- NEXUS, SENTRI, FAST or Global Entry card indicating U.S. or Canadian citizenship
- U.S. or Canadian enhanced driver's license
- Enhanced tribal card, Native American photo identification card, or Canadian Indian status card
- Border Crossing Card, only for entry from Mexico by land, pleasure vessel or ferry
- U.S. or Canadian birth certificate, U.S. Consular Report of Birth Abroad, U.S. naturalization certificate or Canadian citizenship certificate, only for children under age 16, or under age 19 in a supervised group
- Government-issued photo identification along with U.S. birth certificate, Consular Report of Birth Abroad or naturalization certificate, only for travel by cruise ship returning to the same place of departure in the United States

Children born to a U.S. permanent resident mother during a temporary visit abroad do not need a passport or visa at the mother's first re-entry to the United States within two years after birth. Children born abroad to a parent with a U.S. immigrant visa after its issuance do not need a visa if holding a passport and a birth certificate.

It is also possible for the U.S. Department of State to waive the passport requirement for a U.S. national in case of an emergency, for humanitarian reasons or national interest.

== See also ==
- Electronic System for Travel Authorization (ESTA)
- US-VISIT
- Visa policy of the United States
- Visa Waiver Program
