= Videophone Inspection Program and Outlying Area Reporting Station =

The Videophone Inspection Program (VIP) is a U.S. Customs and Border Protection program that enables boaters entering the United States from Canada to be inspected face-to-face by a CBP inspector upon arrival at a selected reporting station. The program was designed to facilitate the legal entry of pleasure boats into the United States that had not been issued a Form I-68.

== History ==
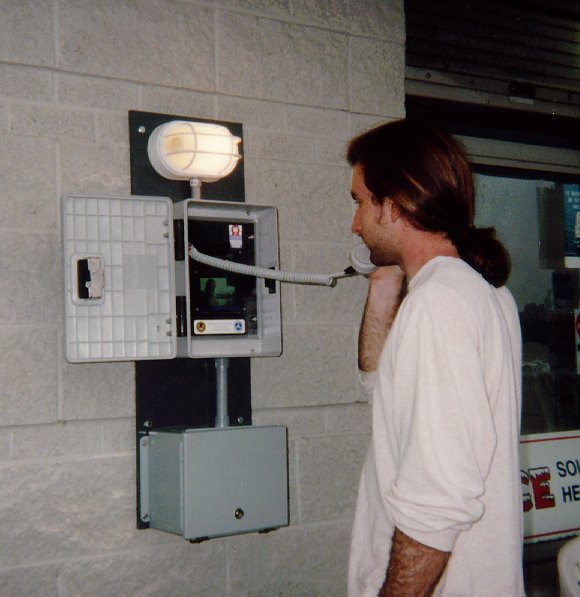
A videophone installed at the East 55th Street Marina in Cleveland, Ohio in 1998.

In June 1997, the US Immigration and Naturalization Service (INS) was mandated by Congress to design, develop and deploy a series of videophone inspection stations at four specific marinas along the US-Canada border in time for the 1997 boating season. In support of the INS, The U.S. Department of Transportation's Volpe Center designed and developed a weatherproof videophone system using commercially available components. The systems were first deployed in Morristown, Waddington, Ogdensburg and Clayton, New York, with installation completed on July 3, 1997.

The videophone system used a video transceiver developed by 8x8 and was housed within a Gaitronics weatherproof housing. Commercially available video screens and other electronic components were also used.

In 1998, the INS directed its contractor Electronic Data Systems to develop another videophone system. This system was called the Outlying Area Reporting Station (OARS), and it was installed on the shores of Grand Lake in Orient, Maine. It featured a card-reading unit and amplified speakerphone audio, but the video transmission was only one-way. This design was not deployed elsewhere; however, the OARS name is sometimes used to describe the current overall videophone program.

From 1998 to 1999 the INS decided to expand the deployment of their VIP system, and by the end of 1999 the system was deployed at the following 33 locations:

| Conneaut, OH | Ashtabula, OH | Geneva, OH |
| Fairport Harbor, OH | Mentor, OH | Eastlake, OH |
| Cleveland - East 55th Marina | Cleveland - Edgewater Marina | Lorain, OH |
| Sandusky, OH | Put-in-Bay, OH | Port Clinton, OH |
| Toledo, OH | Waddington, NY | Ogdensburg, NY |
| Morristown, NY | Clayton, NY | Sackets Harbor, NY |
| Oswego, NY | Olcott Beach, NY | Wilson, NY |
| Youngstown, NY | Rochester, NY - Port of Rochester Marina | Buffalo, NY |
| North Tonawanda, NY | Angle Inlet, MN - Carlson’s Marina | Angle Inlet, MN - Young’s Bay |
| Newport, VT | Erie, PA - Perry's Marina | Erie, PA - Presque Isle Marina |
| Erie, PA - Lampe Marina | Erie, PA - Dobbins Marina | Erie, PA - Safe Harbor Marina |

== Later years ==
Customs and Border Protection continued to operate and maintain the Videophone Inspection Program through 2018, mostly at the same locations. The systems at Angle Inlet were also used to inspect motor vehicles passengers arriving from Canada because there is no port of entry at the border.

Over the years, other locations were added, including Dunkirk, Sodus Point, Point Breeze, New York and Rochester, New York and Mackinac Island. Throughout, the design changed little from the original rapid prototypes of 1997. VIP and OARS were later grouped as the Small Vessel Reporting System (SVRS).

== Current status ==
Due to the widespread adoption of smartphones, the Small Vessel Reporting System was discontinued in 2020. Subsequently, a program called CBP ROAM was initiated, enabling small boaters to report for inspection using a mobile app.
