= Reverification =

Reverification occurs when an employer asks a worker to show his authorization to work after the employee has already shown work authorization documents to the employer. This may be needed when the employee's original work authorization expires.
