= INSPASS =

Former United States government program

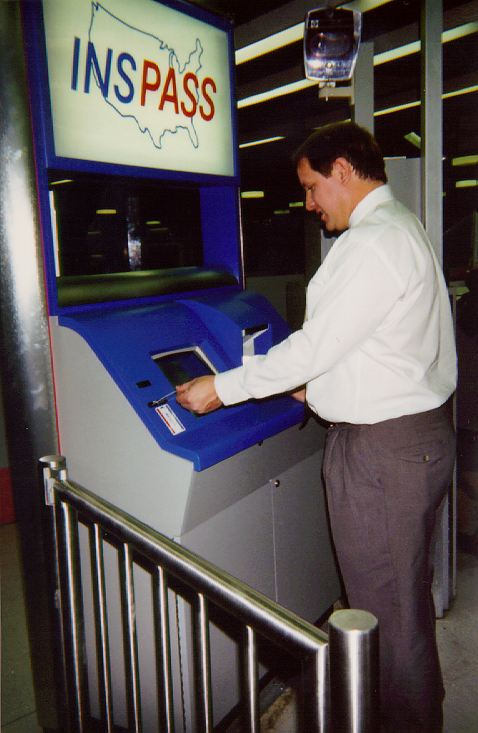
INSPASS kiosk at JFK International Airport, Delta Terminal, 1998

INSPASS, or INS Passenger Accelerated Service System, was a program of the United States Immigration and Naturalization Service (INS) during the 1990s and early 2000s the purpose of which was to facilitate the entry of pre-screened low-risk travellers through immigration and customs at certain airports.

Frequent travelers who were citizens of the U.S. or a handful of other trusted countries could apply for INSPASS privileges. After a background check, approved INSPASS members would register their hand geometry as a biometric identifier and were presented with an associated membership card.

Upon entering the United States after arriving from abroad, users would subject themselves to hand geometry scans and would pass through Federal Inspection without undergoing a formal interview by immigration inspectors. The initial kiosk implementation, as defined by the U.S. Department of Justice, was composed of the following elements:

- ATM-like stand
- 80486 personal computer
- MS-Windows running Visual Basic
- 10 inch monitor/touch-screen
- 16-key keypad
- OCR-B card reader
- Electronic gate lock trigger
- 5 inch Telpar receipt printer
- Recognition Systems, Inc (RSI) 'Handkey' hand geometry scanner

The program initially was established at JFK International Airport and Newark International Airport in May 1993. Later, it expanded to the US Immigration and Customs Pre-Clearance Inspection Stations in Toronto and Vancouver, Canada. Although modeled on the Dutch "SchipholPass" program, INSPASS was the first large scale biometric identity verification program undertaken by the United States Government and quickly became the largest biometric program in the world in terms of enrollments.

The development of the project was initially piloted and then later deployed with support from the John A. Volpe National Transportation Systems Center and INS contractor Computer Data Systems, Inc.. Support for the program was later taken over by Electronic Data Systems (EDS) in 1995 when they were awarded a general support services contract with the U.S. Department of Justice.

Program officials advocated the concept of "One Traveler, One Card" to promote harmonization of the system with other traveler biometric programs and regular meetings were held with the immigration authorities of Canada, the United Kingdom, Germany, Australia, and the Netherlands to achieve that goal. Pilots of land border versions were conducted in Buffalo, New York during the World University Games (summer 1993) and later in Hidalgo, Texas.

Eventually, a total of 15 permanent INSPASS kiosks were deployed at the following locations:

- New York (JFK) (6 terminals)
- Newark
- Toronto (2 terminals)
- Miami (2 terminals)
- Vancouver
- San Francisco
- Los Angeles (LAX) (2 terminals)

The program was discontinued in 2002. It has since been replaced by Global Entry, a program of the U.S. Customs and Border Protection that uses fingerprint biometrics to enable frequent travelers to bypass lines at traditional immigration inspection lanes at international airports.

== See also ==
- Biometrics
- PORTPASS
- U.S. Customs and Border Protection
