= NEXUS =

U.S.–Canada Trusted Traveler Program

NEXUS logo

NEXUS is a joint Canada Border Services Agency and U.S. Customs and Border Protection-operated Trusted Traveler and expedited border control program designed for pre-approved, low-risk travelers. Members of the program can avoid waits at border entry points by using reserved lanes at land crossings into Canada and the United States (including from Mexico), by using self-serve kiosks at airports in Canada, the US, and some international locations, or by phoning border officials for a marine entry. A NEXUS membership card is a valid document under the Western Hemisphere Travel Initiative (WHTI), so it can be used in place of a passport, including by air if flying between the US and Canada. However, carrying a valid passport is still recommended, in the rare event that a flight is diverted to an airport without NEXUS support.

== History ==
NEXUS began as a pilot project in 2000 at the Port Huron–Sarnia border crossing to reduce traffic congestion. At the time, delay-free crossing was available via two independent programs—Port Pass, for crossing into the U.S., and CanPass, for those entering Canada. Customs officials began taking NEXUS applications in October 2000, and the program began operation on November 28, 2000, using a dedicated lane at the Blue Water Bridge. Interest in the program was very high, with 550 approved and 2000 total applicants in the eight weeks leading up to that day. The pilot program was set to last six months, after which it would be put to an independent third-party evaluation. As a result of the September 11, 2001 attacks, the NEXUS lanes were closed and applications suspended while security measures associated with the Smart Border Declaration were implemented. The NEXUS lanes on the Blue Water Bridge reopened in December 2001.

Additional reading:
Remarks by the President and Prime Minister Chretien on U.S. – Canada Smart Borders – September 9, 2002

NEXUS officially launched in September 2002 along with the Free and Secure Trade (FAST) program in a joint announcement by President George W. Bush and Prime Minister Jean Chretien held at the Ambassador Bridge.

== Eligibility ==
To qualify for the program, an applicant must be a citizen or permanent resident of Canada or the United States or Mexican National who holds a Viajero Confiable membership. Permanent residents of the United States or Canada may need to reside in their respective country for three years before applying for NEXUS membership. A previous requirement to have resided in either country for three years has been removed to allow Canadian and American citizens living abroad, and those who have recently returned, to apply for NEXUS. Applicants must also be legally admissible to both Canada and the United States, must have complied with immigration and customs regulations during previous travel, and must undergo a criminal history check. Additionally, if the applicant is under 18, both parents must provide their written consent or attend the interview.

== Application process ==
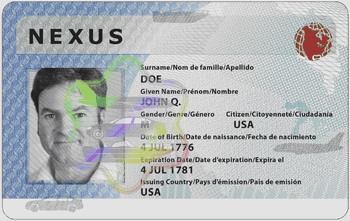
Sample NEXUS card

NEXUS applications are submitted online via the U.S. Customs and Border Protection website. Before October 2024, the application fee was US$50. Effective October 1, 2024, the application fee is US$120, but is waived for applicants under the age of 18.

Applicants are screened for citizenship and immigration status, and checked for criminal history and positive matches on U.S. Federal Bureau of Investigation (FBI), Canadian Security Intelligence Service (CSIS), Royal Canadian Mounted Police (RCMP), Interpol terrorism and no-fly list, United Nations databases, and the United Kingdom Police National Computer. Applicants who pass the initial screening are granted "conditional approval" and then must be interviewed in person by agents of both the Canada Border Services Agency and U.S. Customs and Border Protection (typically one right after the other or at the same time). That is, members must interview with both agencies (unlike Global Entry, another Trusted Traveler Program via US Customs and Border Protection only). An interview does not guarantee final acceptance even if the applicant was granted conditional approval. After final approval, members are mailed an RFID-enabled NEXUS card, valid for five years from the applicant's birthday following card issuance. Renewal typically takes place six months before expiration, and some members may be selected to attend another interview to verify that they still qualify for the program.

Shortly after the announcement of the US requirement for a WHTI document for all travelers by 2009, CBP and CBSA announced their commitment to streamline the membership renewal process for the NEXUS program, and now will waive the interview for members who have not had changes to their information and have maintained their low-risk status. The United States and Canada also announced that they had begun enrollment blitzes to expedite the processing of NEXUS applications and had launched an outreach and awareness plan to increase membership in NEXUS.

== Viajero Confiable Program ==
Mexican nationals who are also members of Mexico's Viajero Confiable Program may apply for the NEXUS Program online as of 2016. US citizens who are members of Global Entry and meet other requirements may apply for the Viajero Confiable card.

At the 2016 North American Leaders’ Summit, it was announced that by the end of 2016, "Canadian and American citizens who are members of the NEXUS Program will be eligible to apply to the Viajero Confiable Program, providing them with expedited immigration screening upon arrival at select international airports in Mexico."

== Use at land crossings ==
NEXUS cardholders are generally screened more quickly than non-NEXUS cardholders at Canadian and United States border crossings, offering NEXUS, Ready, and SENTRI lanes. However, such trusted travelers are still subject to standard immigration and customs checks and may be selected for secondary screening. This is true for any type of border crossing, regardless of which Trusted Traveler Program the person is a member of.

=== Entering Canada by land ===
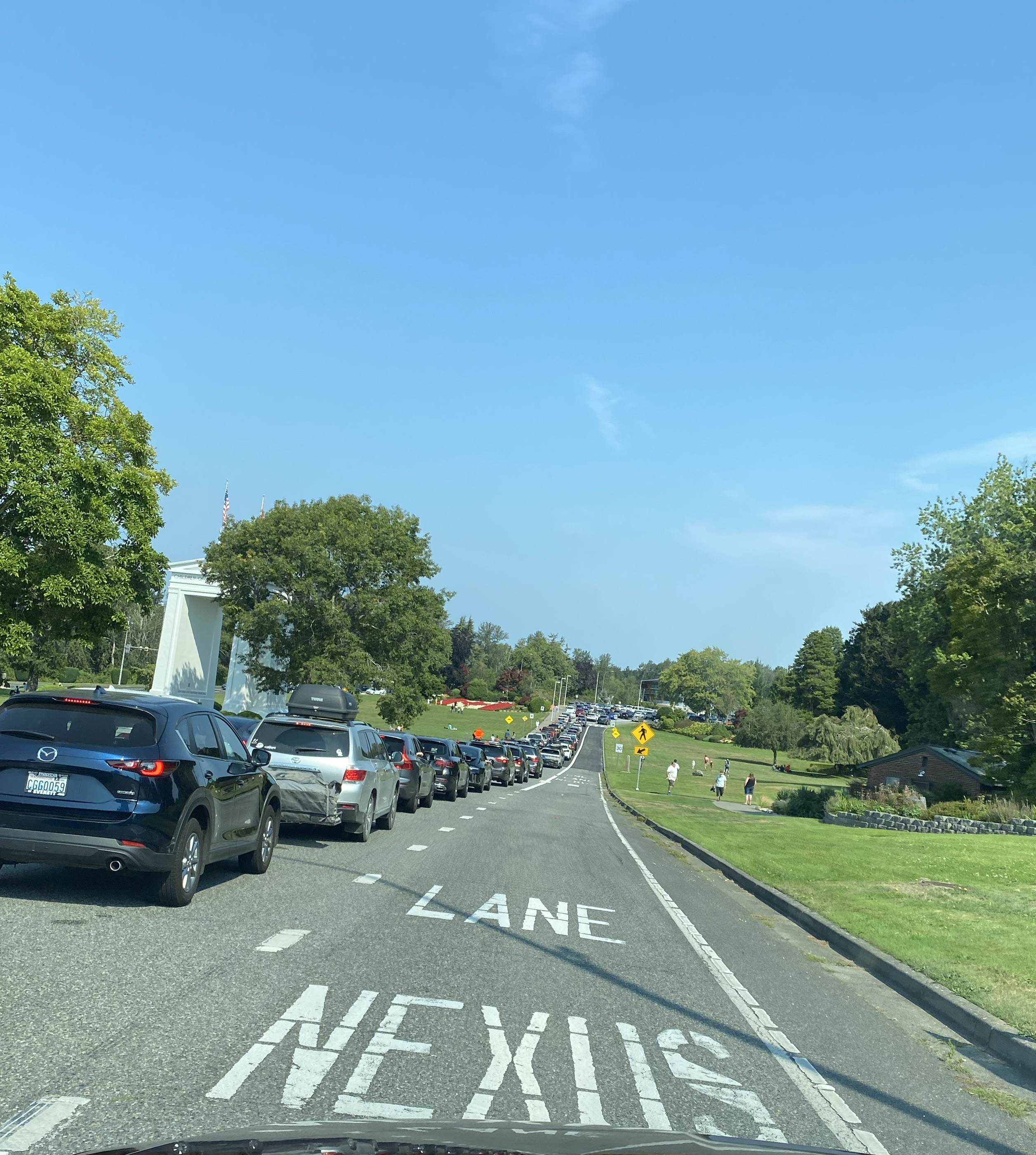
A NEXUS lane at Peace Arch Border Crossing before entering Canada

Participating border crossing points typically have one lane solely reserved for NEXUS use, and some will also designate a second lane for NEXUS use on an as-needed basis. A vehicle can only use the NEXUS lane if all of its passengers (including children) hold a valid NEXUS card and nothing requiring a special customs declaration or payment of duty is being brought into Canada (see below). Members may also use Ready Lanes when entering the US from Canada or Mexico.

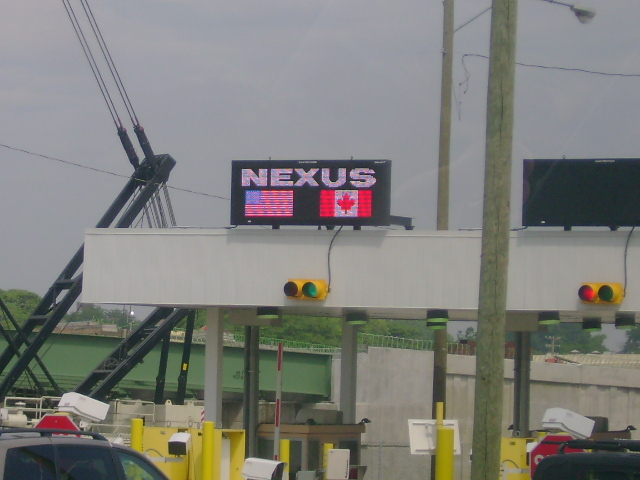
A NEXUS lane at the U.S. side of the Ambassador Bridge

=== Entering the US by land ===
NEXUS cards are valid for RFID Ready Lanes at land crossings into the United States from Canada and Mexico. Ready lanes do not exist in the opposite direction of crossing.

Along the Mexican border, NEXUS members may utilize Secure Electronic Network for Travelers Rapid Inspection (SENTRI) lanes when entering the US by land, but must be traveling in an approved, registered vehicle (SENTRI requires members to register their vehicles into the program, which involves a thorough inspection by CBP, whereas NEXUS has no such requirement). Regardless of whether the traveler is in an approved vehicle or not, the NEXUS card is a WHTI-compliant document and may be used in any standard lane from Mexico into the United States as proof of identity and citizenship. Pedestrians can use dedicated SENTRI lines for expedited entry into the U.S. from Tijuana at the San Ysidro border crossing.

=== Items permitted in a NEXUS lane ===
- Alcohol within a traveler's personal entitlement (the traveler must be out of the country of residence for 48 hours)
- Tobacco products that are marked "Canada-Duty Paid."
- Gifts up to $60 each (into Canada) or up to $100 total (into the United States)
- Any reasonable amounts of personal effects

=== Land crossings with NEXUS lanes ===
- Alberta–Montana:
  - Coutts, AB/Sweetgrass, MT
- British Columbia–Washington:
  - Abbotsford, BC-Huntingdon/Sumas, WA
  - Boundary Bay/Point Roberts, WA
  - Douglas/Peace Arch (Surrey, BC/Blaine, WA)
  - Pacific Highway/Blaine, WA
- Manitoba–North Dakota:
  - Emerson, MB/Pembina, ND
- New Brunswick–Maine:
  - St. Stephen, NB (3rd Bridge)/Calais, ME
  - Woodstock, NB/Houlton, ME
- Ontario–Michigan / Minnesota / New York (state):
  - Ambassador Bridge (Windsor, ON/Detroit)
  - Blue Water Bridge (Sarnia, ON/Port Huron, MI) (also special NEXUS lane on the bridge and entering from Canadian side)
  - Detroit-Windsor Tunnel (Windsor, ON/Detroit) (also special NEXUS lane when entering from Canadian side)
  - Fort Frances, ON/International Falls, MN
  - Gordie Howe International Bridge (Windsor, ON/Detroit)
  - Peace Bridge (Fort Erie, ON/Buffalo)
  - Queenston-Lewiston Bridge (NEXUS available Canada-bound only).
  - Rainbow Bridge (Niagara Falls, ON/Niagara Falls, NY) (NEXUS available US-bound only. Canada-bound lane discontinued in January 2011)
  - Sault Ste. Marie International Bridge (Sault Ste. Marie, ON/Sault Ste. Marie, MI)
  - Thousand Islands Bridge (Hill Island, Ont/Wellesley Island, NY) (NEXUS available US-bound only)
  - Whirlpool Rapids Bridge (Niagara Falls, ON/Niagara Falls, NY) (NEXUS traffic only)
- Quebec–New York State / Vermont:
  - Derby Line-Rock Island (Derby Line, Vermont, Stanstead, Quebec), (limited hours CAN-bound, N/A US-bound)
  - Highgate Springs–St. Armand/Philipsburg Border Crossing (St. Armand-Philipsburg/Highgate Springs, VT) (limited hours US-bound, 24/7 Canada-bound)
  - St. Bernard-de-Lacolle/Champlain, NY

== Use at marine crossings ==
NEXUS members can report to approximately 450 designated sites in Canada or land in the United States by phoning CBSA or CBP as applicable between 30 minutes and 4 hours before landing with specified information and appropriate declarations.

== Use at airports ==
=== Canada ===
NEXUS members entering Canada from anywhere in the world may use a NEXUS machine to make customs declarations. NEXUS originally used iris scans for authentication in these kiosks, but starting in fall 2019, iris scanning has been replaced by facial recognition. If there is no facial scan on file with the CBSA, the user will be prompted to scan their passport and face for subsequent use. US and Canadian citizens may fly between the US and Canada using their NEXUS card without the need for a passport.

NEXUS allows travelers flying from many Canadian airports, even on domestic flights, to bypass the regular security screening line and use an expedited trusted traveler line. Starting June 21 2023 CATSA's new Verified Traveller program introduced additional security screening benefits for NEXUS members.

==== Airports with customs and priority security screening ====
- Billy Bishop Toronto City Airport (Toronto island)
- Calgary International Airport
- Edmonton International Airport
- Halifax Robert L. Stanfield International Airport
- Montréal-Pierre Elliott Trudeau International Airport
- Ottawa Macdonald–Cartier International Airport
- Toronto Pearson International Airport
- Vancouver International Airport
- Winnipeg James Armstrong Richardson International Airport

==== Airports with priority security screening only ====
- Charlottetown Airport
- Greater Moncton International Airport
- Kelowna International Airport
- Québec City Jean Lesage International Airport
- Regina International Airport
- Saskatoon John G. Diefenbaker International Airport
- St. John's International Airport
- Victoria International Airport

=== United States ===
NEXUS fits with the US Global Entry program for expedited customs and immigration clearance. It also affords users TSA PreCheck (without a separate application) for expedited airport security checks. As in all cases, this benefit is not guaranteed: all persons are subject to any kind of screening and may be randomly selected for standard security lanes (though in practice, such selection is rare).

==== U.S. Global Entry ====
All NEXUS members can use their NEXUS membership at Global Entry kiosks regardless of where they are coming from, though NEXUS card facilities are only available at preclearance areas in Canada; however, in other areas, a passport or a U.S. permanent resident card is required. Those using a Global Entry kiosk do not need to fill out a customs declaration card: instead, it is completed digitally on the kiosk (an option for no to all/nothing to declare appears on the GE kiosk, saving even more time, when applicable). If the member needs to see an immigration officer, they get front-of-line privileges (as with all Global Entry members). Travelers holding a valid passport are not required to use the NEXUS card in the kiosk, but they are advised that it is prudent to carry it on their person. There is no additional cost to use Global Entry services, and it can be used for the duration of the NEXUS membership.

Canadian and US citizens flying between Canada and the US may use a NEXUS card instead of a passport because a NEXUS card is a WHTI compliant document. However, Canadian citizens with only a NEXUS card can only use Global Entry kiosks at designated Canadian airports with US preclearance, which are listed below and include Global Entry self-service kiosks:

- Calgary International Airport (YYC)
- Edmonton International Airport (YEG)
- Halifax Stanfield International Airport (YHZ)
- Montréal–Pierre Elliott Trudeau International Airport (YUL)
- Ottawa Macdonald–Cartier International Airport (YOW)
- Toronto Pearson International Airport (YYZ)
- Winnipeg James Armstrong Richardson International Airport (YWG)
- Vancouver International Airport (YVR)

Global Entry kiosks are also located at the following airports in the United States and internationally:

- Anchorage – Ted Stevens International Airport (ANC)
- Austin – Austin–Bergstrom International Airport (AUS)
- Baltimore/Washington International Thurgood Marshall Airport (BWI)
- Boston Logan International Airport (BOS)
- Burlington International Airport (BTV) *
- Charlotte Douglas International Airport (CLT)
- Chicago Midway International Airport (MDW) *
- Chicago O'Hare International Airport (ORD)
- Cincinnati/Northern Kentucky International Airport (CVG)
- Cleveland Hopkins International Airport (CLE)
- Dallas Fort Worth International Airport (DFW)
- Denver International Airport (DEN)
- Detroit Metropolitan Airport (DTW)
- Fairbanks International Airport (FAI)
- Fort Lauderdale–Hollywood International Airport (FLL)
- George Bush Intercontinental Airport, Houston (IAH)
- Guam Antonio B. Won Pat International Airport (GUM)
- Harry Reid International Airport, Las Vegas (LAS)
- Hartsfield–Jackson Atlanta International Airport (ATL)
- Honolulu Daniel K. Inouye International Airport (HNL)
- John F. Kennedy International Airport, New York (JFK)
- John Wayne Airport, Orange County/Santa Ana, CA (SNA) *
- Lambert St. Louis International Airport (STL)
- Los Angeles International Airport (LAX)
- Miami International Airport (MIA)
- Milwaukee Mitchell International Airport (MKE)
- Minneapolis–Saint Paul International Airport (MSP)
- Newark Liberty International Airport (EWR)
- Oakland International Airport (OAK) *
- Orlando International Airport (MCO)
- Orlando Sanford International Airport (SFB)
- Philadelphia International Airport (PHL)
- Phoenix Sky Harbor International Airport (PHX)
- Pittsburgh International Airport (PIT)
- Portland International Airport (PDX)
- Raleigh–Durham International Airport (RDU) *
- Saipan International Airport (SPN) *
- Salt Lake City International Airport (SLC)
- San Antonio International Airport (SAT)
- San Diego International Airport (SAN)
- San Francisco International Airport (SFO)
- San Jose International Airport (SJC) *
- San Juan Luis Muñoz Marín International Airport (SJU)
- Seattle–Tacoma International Airport/SeaTac (SEA)
- Tampa International Airport (TPA)
- Washington Dulles International Airport (IAD)
- Abu Dhabi Zayed International Airport (AUH) *
- Aruba Queen Beatrix International Airport (AUA) *
- Shannon Airport (SNN) *
- Nassau Lynden Pindling International Airport, Bahamas (NAS) *
- Dublin Airport (DUB) *

* There are no enrollment centers at these locations.

==== TSA PreCheck ====
Canadian and US citizens as well as U.S. permanent residents who are NEXUS members may use TSA PreCheck on all participating airlines, when passing through security checks on both international and domestic flights departing the USA, by entering the Customs and Border Protection PASS ID / KTN (Known Traveler Number) from their NEXUS card into their flight reservation information or into their frequent flyer account.

== Legal status of NEXUS card ==
In the United States, a trusted traveler card, such as NEXUS, is a valid secured document under the Western Hemisphere Travel Initiative and may be used by itself to re-enter the United States from Canada, including (in the case of NEXUS specifically) by air. Although the card creates a presumption of nationality, neither US nor Canadian law views the NEXUS card as full proof of citizenship. NEXUS cards issued after September 2010 are accepted as proof of citizenship (if the cardholder is a citizen of either country), and the traveler is no longer required to carry a passport.

NEXUS and FAST membership cards are accepted as proof of identity and as documents that denote citizenship when entering Canada at all land and marine ports of entry. This means that citizens of Canada and the United States who are NEXUS or FAST members, and are carrying their valid membership cards, are no longer required to carry other supplementary documents, such as passports or birth certificates, with them when entering Canada by boat or by land, when using non-NEXUS or non-FAST lanes.

NEXUS and FAST members who are not citizens of Canada or the United States are still required to travel with a passport and proof of permanent residence, and they are required to present them at the same time to the examining officer. For Form I-9 employment verification, a NEXUS card is an acceptable List B identity document as an ID card issued by a federal agency.

== See also ==
- CANPASS
- FAST / EXPRES (similar program for international truck drivers)
- Global Entry (similar program for travel outside North America)
- SENTRI (similar program for travel to Mexico)
