= Global Entry =

U.S. Customs and Border Protection program

Logo

Global Entry is a program of the U.S. Customs and Border Protection service that allows pre-approved, low-risk travelers to receive expedited clearance upon arrival into the United States through automatic kiosks at select airports and via the SENTRI and NEXUS lanes by land and sea. As of 2024, Global Entry was available at 62 U.S. airports and 14 non-U.S. airports with U.S. preclearance, with more than 12.7 million people being enrolled in the program.

== History ==
During the 1990s and early 2000s, the US Immigration and Naturalization Service operated INSPASS, a trusted traveler program designed to integrate with Canadian and European programs, at JFK and Newark Airports. INSPASS operated with a similar system, identifying travelers with their handprint. The program was discontinued in 2002 when the INS was merged with U.S. Customs to form U.S. Customs and Border Protection.

The Global Entry program was initially deployed in 2008 at a small number of airports, including New York-JFK (Terminal 4), Washington-Dulles and Houston-Intercontinental. Following a positive reception by travelers, the program was expanded to include Los Angeles International, Atlanta-Hartsfield, Chicago-O'Hare and Miami International Airport.

In May 2009, Global Entry membership was expanded to include Dutch citizens who were members of the Privium trusted traveler program under the FLUX (Fast Low-risk Universal Crossing) alliance. Members of Global Entry are now permitted to apply to the Privium program at Amsterdam-Schiphol International Airport allowing entry into the Schengen area. Members of NEXUS and SENTRI are also entitled to use Global Entry.

=== 2020 suspension of New York state residents ===
New York's immigrant sanctuary "Green Light Law", enacted in 2020, prohibited its state DMV from sharing criminal records with the federal Customs and Border Protection (CBP) or Immigration and Customs Enforcement (ICE) without a court order. New York provides driver's licenses to undocumented immigrants, as do over a dozen other states, though none of those other states placed as tight of restrictions on the federal government's access to DMV records.

In response to this, on February 6, 2020, the Department of Homeland Security announced that it would prohibit New York state residents from applying for or renewing trusted traveler programs including Global Entry. This affected about 175,000 New Yorkers whose trusted traveler memberships would expire in 2020 and another 80,000 New Yorkers with pending applications. The Trump administration said it would reinstate access to the trusted traveler programs if New York state opened its DMV records to the federal government.

New York did not immediately agree to these terms. The next day, state officials promised to sue the Trump administration. They said the lawsuit would argue that "the federal government's actions were arbitrary and capricious, did not provide state residents equal protection and violated the state's sovereign immunity," according to The New York Times. New York attorney general Letitia James filed the lawsuit against CBP and DHS on February 10.

However, on February 12, New York Governor Andrew Cuomo said he would comply with the Trump administration's request. He said he would propose either a legislative bill or a change to the New York state budget to grant the federal government access to New York's motor vehicle data, but only to the records of trusted traveler applicants and members, and only on a case-by-case basis. On February 13, Cuomo met with Trump at the White House; details of the meeting were not disclosed.

On July 23, 2020, after New York amended its law to allow federal agencies access to state records of applicants to trusted traveler programs, the Department of Homeland Security reopened the programs for New York residents.

== Enrollment ==
To enroll in Global Entry, applicants must first file an application with U.S. Customs and Border Protection, and then submit to an interview and background check (which checks against multiple databases, including more than are used for a TSA PreCheck). The application includes employment history and residences for the prior five years. After submission, applicants must wait for either conditional approval or rejection. If conditionally approved, all first-time applicants must schedule an appointment for an interview, photograph and fingerprints. The wait for an interview may be months to a year. There is no minimum number of international trips required to qualify for the Global Entry program.

There is a non-refundable fee of US$120 due at the time of application (before consideration for conditional approval). Children under age 18 are exempt from the fee if their parent or legal guardian is applying at the same time or is already a member. Before October 2024, the fee was US$100 for applicants of any age. Some credit cards (generally those with relatively high annual fees) reimburse this fee to both the cardholder and household family members.

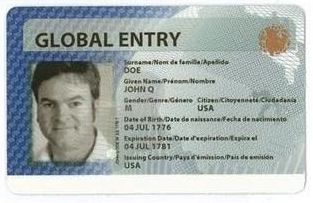
Global Entry membership card

During the interview, the applicant's fingerprints are captured and a digital photo is taken. Applicants are also given instructions on how to use the automated kiosk. The applicant is not always approved on-site, but the interviewing CBP officer makes the final determination and can mark full approval immediately to within 15 minutes or hours later the same day. In any case, the program sends both an email notification and a letter stating the outcome, and this message is sent upon the interviewing officer's input of their decision. The email directs applicants to login to their DHS TTP portal to view the outcome. The physical letter may contain a membership ID card (typically only included if requested via the DHS TTP web portal). However, the card is neither required for any aspect of the program and also cannot be used at kiosks (i.e., a passport is still required). If a participant does not receive a card or else needs a replacement, the member may request via the TTP portal.

An advantage to viewing the status online is that, if approved, the Known Traveler ID ("KTN", required to be provided to participating airlines in order to receive TSA PreCheck) is supplied and may be used immediately. Otherwise, the approved applicant has to wait for their KTN in the physically mailed letter.

Although an ID card serves no purpose during customs interactions, it can be used as a photo ID at U.S. airports and for entry into certain other federal buildings. Further, airports without dedicated PreCheck lanes occasionally allow cardholding members to bypass standard security: while they wait in line, a special paper is given and provided to the x-ray operator letting them know that the member does not need to remove liquids, computer or clothing. However, this practice is much more common for after-hours use (i.e., this process is often used once the staffed, dedicated PreCheck lane is closed). The card is also WHTI-compliant, meaning it can be used at U.S. land and sea crossings into the U.S. from Canada and Mexico, only by U.S. Citizens (entry from all other countries and entry via air from any country still require a passport). The card is RFID enabled, so it can be used in Ready Lanes at such border checkpoints (an RFID enabled card is required for SENTRI, NEXUS and Ready lanes because data must be read wirelessly in advance to allow border guards to preprocess passengers before the vehicle arrives at the crossing station). Further, Global Entry participants may also use the dedicated SENTRI and NEXUS lanes to enter the U.S. (vehicle approval may be required prior to using SENTRI lanes).

Once an application is approved, the applicant may use the Global Entry kiosk at any participating airport for a duration of five years. The five year period begins at the member's next birthday following approval. So for instance, an applicant with a birthday in October who is approved in May (i.e., 5 months prior to their birthday) will enjoy 5 years + 5 months of privileges.

Renewal of membership requires an additional fee (the same amount as charged for new applicants), and in some cases, renewal applicants are selected for a new interview. Early renewal is encouraged, and the renewal may be started beginning on the participant's birthday exactly 365 days ahead of expiration. The TSA maintains a list of credit card issuers and loyalty programs that reimburse members' TSA PreCheck and/or Global Entry application fees.

== Disqualification and revocation ==
Any type of criminal conviction can disqualify a traveler from the Global Entry program: it is a risk-based system to facilitate the entry of pre-approved travelers. Three to five percent of travelers who sign up for the program are rejected; in such cases, they are generally told the reason for the rejection. Applicants may not qualify if they provide false or incomplete information on the application, if they have pending criminal charges or for any other legal/customs issues (particularly, but not exclusively, for customs-related offenses) such as, for example, having previously paid a fine for transporting a prohibited or undeclared item at a port of entry in the U.S. or even abroad.

Those whose Global Entry applications are denied have three ways to appeal: making an appointment to speak with a supervisor at a trusted traveler enrollment center, e-mailing the CBP Trusted Traveler Ombudsman, or filing a complaint through the Department of Homeland Security's Traveler Redress Inquiry Program.

CBP claims that less than one percent of active Global Entry participants' privileges are revoked. In these situations, an explanation for the revocation is not necessarily supplied.

A common explanation for revocation or denial of re-approval is simply that the applicant no longer meets the inclusion criteria (i.e., a full reason is not supplied). Often, this means some kind of criminal activity, such as an outstanding warrant. Once said item is addressed, applicants have a chance of success, but it is still required to appeal via one of the above-listed three avenues. Notably, the Ombudsman may be reached, in certain circumstances, via the DHS TTP portal. Otherwise, a submission is required via the mail.

== Entry procedure ==
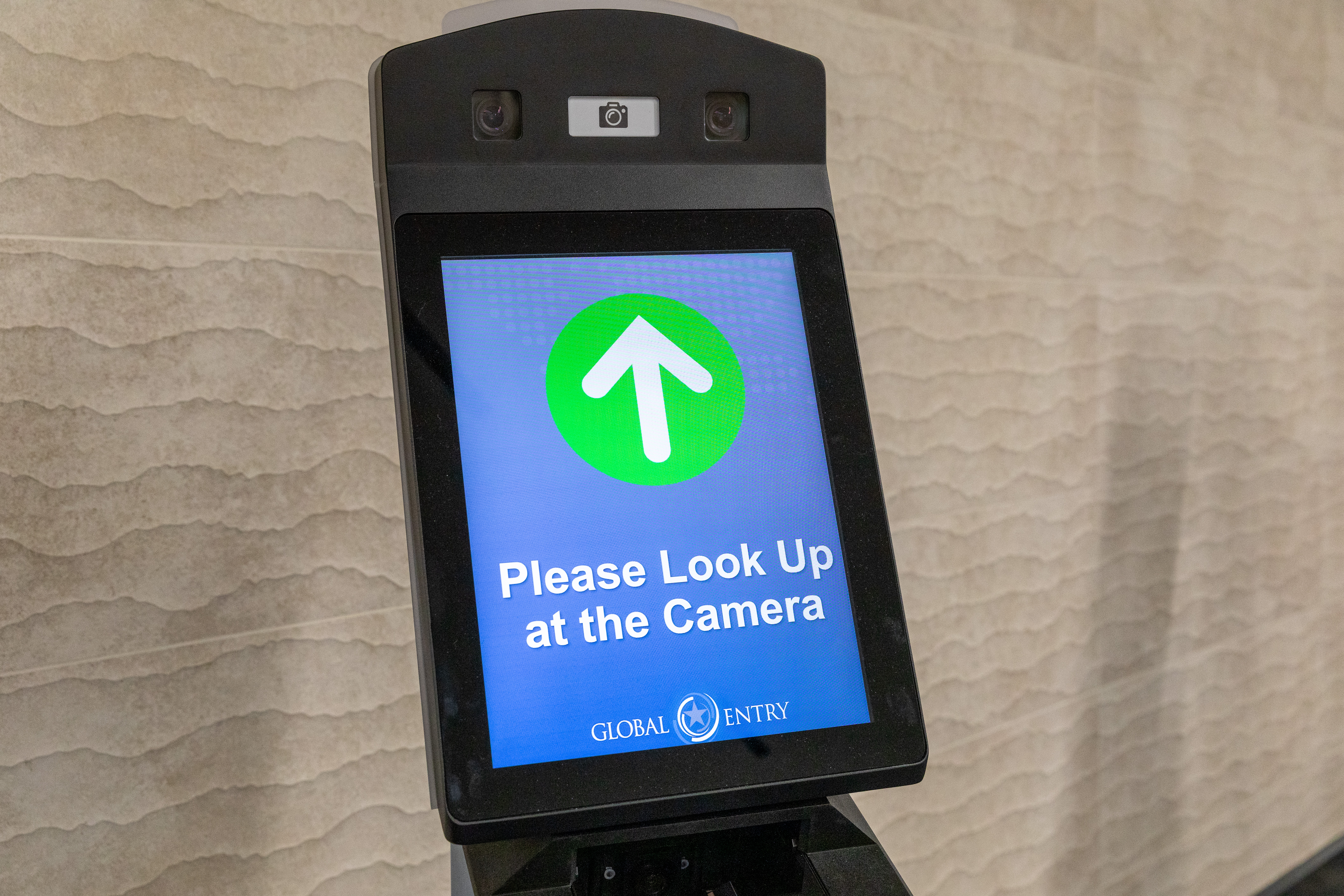
Global Entry kiosk

When entering by air, enrolled members have a photograph taken at kiosks or through CBP's mobile app. Customs declarations are made orally to officers, if kiosks are used; app users make digital declarations. Enrolled members, like all other passengers, are required to carry their passports or NEXUS cards when entering by air; however, they are not always asked to present their travel documents to officers after verifying their identities via facial recognition.

For entering by land, enrolled users are provided with an RFID-enabled Global Entry membership card that may be used to enter the United States via expedited NEXUS lanes from Canada, SENTRI lanes from Mexico (requires vehicle approval), or Ready Lane from either country. The card may also be used at sea ports of entry by U.S. Citizens without the need of a passport. The Global Entry Card cannot be used to enter Canada: a passport is required. The card may be used, however, to return into the U.S. via land borders.

== Other programs ==
=== NEXUS and SENTRI ===
NEXUS is a trusted traveller program operated jointly by the U.S. Customs and Border Protection and the Canada Border Services Agency that allows pre-approved, low-risk travelers to receive expedited clearance upon arrival into the United States and Canada by air, land, and water. The program is available to U.S. citizens, U.S. permanent residents, Canadian citizens, Canadian permanent residents, and Mexican nationals. Members of NEXUS can use the benefits of Global Entry if their fingerprints and passport information were collected during the interview to apply for the program.

SENTRI is similar to the NEXUS program, but it is fully operated by the U.S. Customs and Border Protection. It allows expedited entry to the United States at the Mexico–United States border for pre-approved travelers that are considered low-risk. U.S. citizens, U.S. permanent residents, and all foreign nationals are eligible for the program. U.S. citizens and U.S. permanent residents may use their SENTRI card at Global Entry kiosks. Mexican nationals who are SENTRI members may apply for Global Entry after passing a risk assessment conducted by the Mexican government.

=== TSA PreCheck ===
Members of Global Entry (along with members of NEXUS and SENTRI) may use TSA PreCheck on all participating airlines by entering their Known Traveler Number into their flight reservation information or into their frequent flyer account. While any person, including TTP participants, may be subjected to standard or enhanced screening at any time, denying PreCheck to Global Entry members is rare. PreCheck is included for all Global Entry members, NEXUS members who are U.S. citizens, U.S. permanent residents or Canadian citizens, and SENTRI members who are U.S. citizens or U.S. permanent residents.

== Eligibility ==
Countries participating in Global Entry or NEXUS Countries planning to participate in Global Entry

As of 2026, in addition to U.S. nationals and U.S. lawful permanent residents, nationals of the following countries (Note: According to the Taiwan Relations Act, U.S. laws treat Taiwan as a country despite the absence of diplomatic recognition.) may also apply for Global Entry:

- Argentina
- Australia
- Bahrain
- Brazil
- Colombia
- Costa Rica
- Croatia
- Dominican Republic
- El Salvador
- Germany
- India
- Japan
- Jordan
- Mexico
- Netherlands
- Panama
- Saudi Arabia
- Singapore
- South Korea
- Switzerland
- Taiwan
- United Arab Emirates
- United Kingdom (Note: British citizens only.)

Nationals and permanent residents of Canada are not eligible to apply for Global Entry but they may apply for NEXUS, whose members have all benefits of Global Entry including using its kiosks.

A limited number of nationals of Israel and Qatar have been able to apply for Global Entry as a trial before eligibility is expanded to all nationals of these countries.

As of 2020, more than 97% of Global Entry members were citizens or permanent residents of the United States.

Global Entry members by country in 2020
| Country | Members |
|---|---|
| U.S. citizens | 6,693,734 |
| U.S. permanent residents | 216,819 |
| Mexico | 111,667 |
| United Kingdom | 40,810 |
| Germany | 14,060 |
| India | 8,532 |
| Taiwan | 5,058 |
| Argentina | 4,708 |
| South Korea | 4,155 |
| Singapore | 3,569 |
| Panama | 3,093 |
| Colombia | 3,024 |
| Switzerland | 2,276 |
| Netherlands | 2,203 |
| Japan | 1,247 |
| Qatar | 582 |
| Israel | 465 |
| Saudi Arabia | 28 |
| Total | 7,116,030 |

== Airports with kiosks ==
Participants may enter the United States (or the United States preclearance area in select international airports) by utilizing automated kiosks located at the following airports:

=== United States ===
- Anchorage Ted Stevens International Airport (ANC)
- Atlanta Hartsfield–Jackson International Airport (ATL)
- Austin–Bergstrom International Airport (AUS)
- Baltimore/Washington International Airport (BWI)
- Boston Logan International Airport (BOS)
- Burlington International Airport (BTV)
- Charleston International Airport (CHS)
- Charlotte Douglas International Airport (CLT)
- Chicago Midway International Airport (MDW)
- Chicago O'Hare International Airport (ORD)
- Cincinnati/Northern Kentucky International Airport (CVG)
- Cleveland Hopkins International Airport (CLE)
- Dallas Fort Worth International Airport (DFW)
- Denver International Airport (DEN)
- Detroit Metropolitan Airport (DTW)
- Fairbanks International Airport (FAI)
- Fort Lauderdale–Hollywood International Airport (FLL)
- Guam A.B. Won Pat International Airport (GUM)
- Hartford–Springfield Bradley International Airport (BDL)
- Honolulu Daniel K. Inouye International Airport (HNL)
- Houston George Bush Intercontinental Airport (IAH)
- Houston William P. Hobby Airport (HOU)
- Indianapolis International Airport (IND)
- Kansas City International Airport (MCI)
- Las Vegas Harry Reid International Airport (LAS)
- Los Angeles International Airport (LAX)
- Melbourne Orlando International Airport (MLB)
- Miami International Airport (MIA)
- Milwaukee Mitchell International Airport (MKE)
- Minneapolis–Saint Paul International Airport (MSP)
- Nashville International Airport (BNA)
- New Orleans Louis Armstrong International Airport (MSY)
- New York John F. Kennedy International Airport (JFK)
- New York Stewart International Airport (SWF)
- Newark Liberty International Airport (EWR)
- Oakland International Airport (OAK)
- Ontario International Airport (ONT)
- Orlando International Airport (MCO)
- Orlando Sanford International Airport (SFB)
- Philadelphia International Airport (PHL)
- Phoenix Sky Harbor International Airport (PHX)
- Pittsburgh International Airport (PIT)
- Portland International Airport (PDX)
- Raleigh–Durham International Airport (RDU)
- Rhode Island T. F. Green International Airport (PVD)
- Sacramento International Airport (SMF)
- Saipan International Airport (SPN)
- Salt Lake City International Airport (SLC)
- San Antonio International Airport (SAT)
- San Diego International Airport (SAN)
- San Francisco International Airport (SFO)
- San Jose International Airport (SJC)
- San Juan Luis Muñoz Marín International Airport (SJU)
- Santa Ana John Wayne Airport (SNA)
- Seattle–Tacoma International Airport (SEA)
- South Bend International Airport (SBN)
- Southwest Florida International Airport (RSW)
- St. Louis Lambert International Airport (STL)
- St. Pete–Clearwater International Airport (PIE)
- Tampa International Airport (TPA)
- Toledo Express Airport (TOL)
- Washington Dulles International Airport (IAD)

=== U.S. preclearance ===
- Abu Dhabi Zayed International Airport (AUH)
- Aruba Queen Beatrix International Airport (AUA)
- Bermuda L.F. Wade International Airport (BDA)
- Calgary International Airport (YYC)
- Dublin Airport (DUB)
- Edmonton International Airport (YEG)
- Halifax Stanfield International Airport (YHZ)
- Montréal–Trudeau International Airport (YUL)
- Nassau Lynden Pindling International Airport (NAS)
- Ottawa Macdonald–Cartier International Airport (YOW)
- Shannon Airport (SNN)
- Toronto Pearson International Airport (YYZ)
- Vancouver International Airport (YVR)
- Winnipeg Richardson International Airport (YWG)

== Analogous systems in other countries ==
- Canada: the CANPASS provides expedited customs and immigration clearance for travelers flying on corporate and private aircraft from the United States. The program costs CA$40 and is valid for five years. The program was previously available for commercial airline passengers and private boats and operated similar to Global Entry. The program was discontinued in 2018 in favour of NEXUS, which has the same benefits of the former CANPASS program in addition to the benefits of Global Entry, with existing members being allowed to kept their membership until it expired.
- Hong Kong: e-Channel is situated at all border crossing points. A person who holds a Hong Kong Identity Card (HKID) or has registered for access scans their travel document to enter the first gate and then has their thumbprint scanned to pass through the second gate.
- Japan: equivalent to the US program, Automated gate, costs 2200 JPY in the form of revenue stamps. It is similar in that a passport and fingerprint are scanned at a kiosk to pass.
- Mexico: Viajero Confiable program is open to Mexican citizens, and U.S and Canadian citizens who are members of Global Entry or permanent residents of Mexico. Prospective members must pass a background check and an interview with a Mexican immigration officer, and have fingerprints and iris scans taken. Kiosks are currently available at the Cancun, Los Cabos, and Mexico City international airports, but the Mexican government hopes to expand it to other cities in the near future.
- Singapore: enhanced-Immigration Automated Clearance System (eIACS) enables Singaporean citizens aged 6 and above, foreigners that hold a valid work pass in Singapore and foreign visitors who enrolled in relevant Traveller programmes (stated below), to arrive and depart Singapore using the automated immigration gates at Singapore points of entry. US citizens aged 6 or above (who are not residing in Singapore) who are participating in Global Entry and have visited Singapore at least twice in the last 24 months are eligible to enroll into the Singapore - United States of America Trusted Traveller Programme (TTP). Electronic passport holders from other selected nations are eligible to enroll for the broader Frequent Traveller Programme. All Singaporean citizens are exempted from enrolling into the eIACS, as they have registered their fingerprints whilst applying for a Singapore national registration identity card (NRIC) or Singapore passport. Foreigners who hold a valid work pass are also exempted from enrolling into the eIACS, as they have registered their fingerprints whilst applying for the relevant work pass.
- South Korea: Smart Entry Service is the automated immigration clearance system. South Korean citizens aged 7 or above, all foreigners residing in South Korea aged 17 or above, US citizens aged 17 or above who are not residing in South Korea and participating in Global Entry, and Hong Kong and Macau electronic passport holders aged 17 or above are eligible for the program. South Korean citizens who registered their fingerprints are exempted from pre-registration. US dual citizens holding South Korean citizenship must use their South Korean passports to use the programme. US citizens with a valid South Korean visa must use their Alien Registration Card to participate in the programme and are exempted from the Global Entry prerequisite. It uses both facial recognition and fingerprinting technology.
- Taiwan: e-Gate is an automated entry system for ROC citizens, certain categories of resident foreigners, and frequent visitors with biometric passports from select countries, including US citizens participating in Global Entry. Enrolled users simply scan their travel documents at the gate and are passed through for facial recognition. Electronic fingerprinting is used if facial recognition fails. Interviews and final registration is available at the immigration counter at major ports of entry. Global Entry applicants must have applied online prior to arrival with payment of the NT$3000 application fee and received conditional approval; all other eligible applicants may enroll for free upon arrival. e-Gate enrollments of all foreign visitors are valid until six months prior to the expiration of the associated passport.
