= Free and Secure Trade =

Joint US-Canada border crossing initiative

Logo of the Free and Secure Trade program

The Free and Secure Trade (FAST) program is a joint United States-Canadian program between the Canada Border Services Agency and the U.S. Customs and Border Protection. The FAST initiative offers pre-authorized importers, carriers and drivers expedited clearance for eligible goods, building on what Canada previously implemented under their Customs Self Assessment (CSA) program. In the French language, FAST is referred to as EXPRES – Expéditions rapides et sécuritaires.

The FAST program offers pre-authorized importers, carriers and drivers expedited clearance for eligible goods, and builds on what Canada has already implemented under the Customs Self Assessment (CSA) program.

The program aims to clear shipments faster and more cheaply by:

- Reducing the information needed for border/customs clearance
- Eliminating the need for importers to transmit data for each transaction
- Dedicating lanes for FAST clearances at border crossings.
- Reducing the rate of border examinations
- Verifying trade compliance away from the border
- Streamlining accounting and payment for all goods imported by approved importers (Canada only)

The FAST Card is available to drivers who have been jointly approved by Canada and the United States. Each country must approve carriers and importers separately. As a result, a FAST importer and/or carrier can choose to be approved only into Canada or only into the United States.

Enrollment centers are located at major border crossings and offices throughout Canada.

== History ==
FAST officially launched in September 2002 along with the NEXUS program in a joint announcement by President George W. Bush and Prime Minister Jean Chretien held at the Ambassador Bridge.

== Eligibility requirements ==
Because of increased security concerns in the U.S. as a result of the September 11, 2001 attacks, many Canadian commercial drivers are required to obtain a FAST Pass by their employers. However, many of those drivers may not qualify through normal application because of a past criminal record. Moreover, some types of crimes, particularly those involving illegal drugs or moral turpitude, may make some Canadian applicants ineligible to enter the United States. Such applicants must first obtain a Canadian pardon and/or a United States Waiver of Inadmissibility (since Canadian pardons are not accepted by the US) before a FAST Card will be issued.

Various companies and legal firms within Canada claim to expedite the process of obtaining the needed pardons from provincial and/or federal agencies, and the U. S. waiver where needed.

== See also ==
- Intelligent transportation system
- Radio-frequency identification (RFID)
- Roper Industries (TransCore)
- CANAMEX Corridor
