= SENTRI =

US border crossing scheme

SENTRI program logo

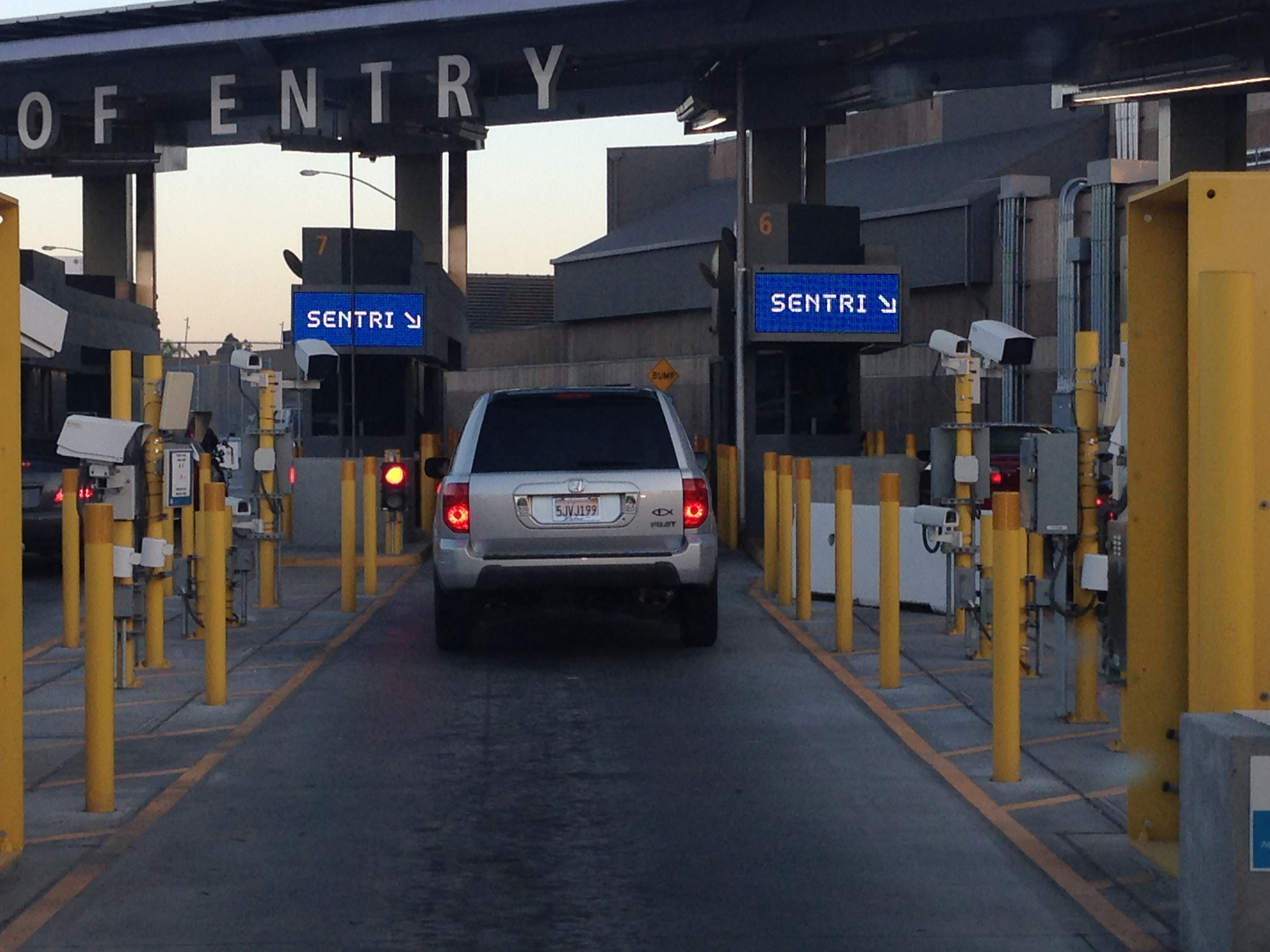
SENTRI lanes at San Ysidro border crossing/port of entry, 2015. Tijuana, Mexico, to San Diego, California.

The Secure Electronic Network for Travelers Rapid Inspection (SENTRI) is a U.S. Customs and Border Protection (CBP) program that provides expedited clearance for pre-approved travelers at United States ports of entry. Participants in the program undergo rigorous background checks and are deemed low-risk travelers by CBP. Voluntary applicants must undergo a thorough background check against criminal, customs, immigration, law enforcement, and terrorist databases; a 10-fingerprint law enforcement check; and a personal interview with a CBP officer. The total enrollment fee is about $120, and SENTRI status is valid for five years.

Once the applicant is approved, they are issued a radio-frequency identification (RFID) card identifying their status in the CBP database when arriving at U.S. land and sea ports of entry (POE). SENTRI users have access to dedicated lanes into the United States. Unlike NEXUS, which is a joint program between United States and Canadian immigration authorities, SENTRI is solely a CBP program and only applies to customs and immigration inspections into the United States, not into Mexico. SENTRI members are permitted to utilize NEXUS lanes when entering the United States from Canada by land (but not vice versa).

Global Entry allows registered users to enter their own SENTRI applications and approved members to edit their information. A valid SENTRI card is a Western Hemisphere Travel Initiative (WHTI) compliant document.

== History ==
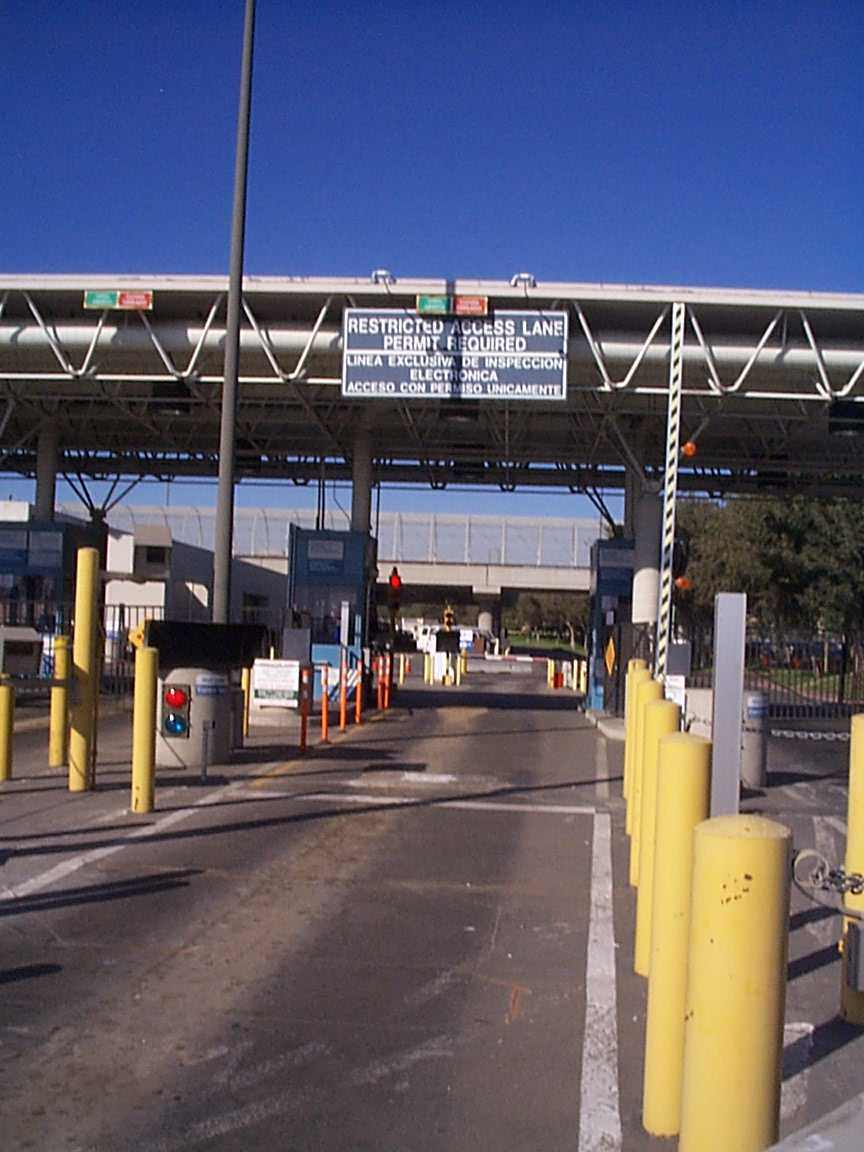
SENTRI lane at Otay Mesa in 1997

The Secure Electronic Network for Travelers Rapid Inspection (SENTRI) is a trusted traveler program administered by U.S. Customs and Border Protection that facilitates expedited entry into the United States at designated ports of entry. Participation is limited to individuals who have undergone extensive background screening and are determined by CBP to pose a low security risk.

The SENTRI program was conceived in 1995 and first implemented at the Otay Mesa Port of Entry in San Diego, California. Additional technology tests, including in-vehicle biometrics and laneside facial recognition, were conducted at this site.

In 1998, the decision was made to expand SENTRI to El Paso, Texas. The aim was to relieve congestion at the busy Paso del Norte International Bridge. However, this bridge was not wide enough to set aside one lane as a dedicated commuter lane. Therefore, the nearby Stanton Street bridge, which had been a southbound-only bridge, was chosen as the best place to deploy SENTRI. A new port of entry facility was built, and the SENTRI lane opened in September 1999.

Next, the SENTRI team elected to deploy a system at the busiest single border crossing in the world, San Ysidro, California. The congested nature of Tijuana, near the border crossing, made it difficult to identify a place to put the dedicated lane, but with the cooperation of many organizations on both sides of the border, a lane was segregated, and SENTRI opened at San Ysidro in 2000, after which point the SENTRI team was disbanded, and SENTRI became a program office within INS. After INS was sunsetted on March 1, 2003, the SENTRI program office was absorbed by DHS Customs and Border Protection. Today, SENTRI Lanes can be found at the following ports of entry, from West to East:

California

- San Ysidro Port of Entry, San Diego, California
- Otay Mesa Port of Entry, San Diego, California
- Calexico West Port of Entry, Calexico, California
- Calexico East Port of Entry, Calexico, California

Arizona

- San Luis Port of Entry, San Luis, Arizona
- Nogales-Grand Avenue Port of Entry, Nogales, Arizona
- Douglas Arizona Port of Entry, Douglas, Arizona

Texas

- El Paso Stanton Street Port of Entry, El Paso, Texas
- El Paso Ysleta Port of Entry, El Paso, Texas
- Del Rio Texas Port of Entry, Del Rio, Texas
- Eagle Pass Camino Real Port of Entry, Eagle Pass, Texas
- Laredo Colombia Solidarity Port of Entry, Laredo, Texas
- Laredo Juarez-Lincoln Port of Entry, Laredo, Texas
- Anzalduas Port of Entry, Mission, Texas
- Hidalgo Texas Port of Entry, Hidalgo, Texas
- Pharr Texas Port of Entry, Pharr, Texas
- Brownsville – Veterans Port of Entry, Brownsville, Texas

== US Global Entry ==
US citizens may use their SENTRI membership at US Customs and Border Protection Global Entry kiosks located in participating US airports. Mexican nationals who are SENTRI members may apply for Global Entry after passing a risk assessment conducted by the Mexican government.

== TSA PreCheck ==
US citizens who are SENTRI members may use TSA PreCheck on all participating airlines by entering their Customs and Border Protection ID number or PASS ID/KTN (Known Traveler Number) from their SENTRI card into their flight reservation information or into their frequent flyer account. The same privileges extend to NEXUS and Global Entry members. Note that such Trusted Travelers have a very high probability of receiving PreCheck, it is not guaranteed: TSA still uses random procedures for all passengers. This said, Global Entry participants have the absolute highest priority/likelihood for receiving PreCheck (per CBP documents, including a note that it’s included—not “may” receive—with GE).

== Enrollment centers ==
Enrollment centers are located in Douglas, Nogales, and San Luis, Arizona; Calexico, Otay Mesa, and San Ysidro, California; and Brownsville, El Paso, Hidalgo, and Laredo, Texas.

== See also ==
- Automatic vehicle identification
- List of Mexico–United States border crossings
- NEXUS
- PORTPASS
- Viajero Confiable
