= Travel document =

Identity document that allows a person to travel internationally

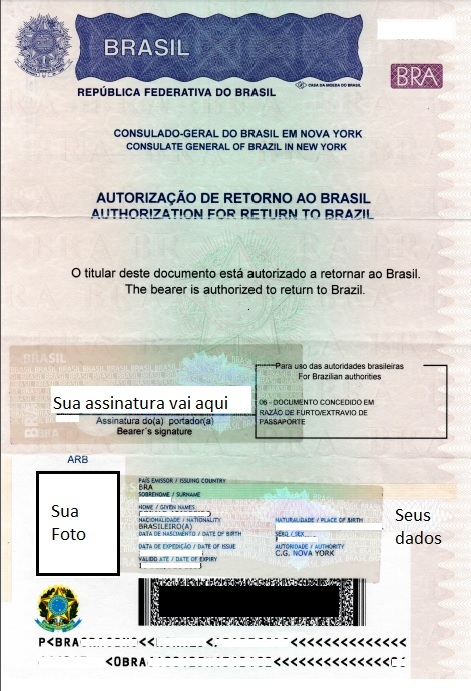
The "Authorization for Return to Brazil" is an alternative travel document issued to Brazilians who have lost their passport while abroad; it allows one's bearer to travel back to Brazil

A travel document is an identity document issued by a government or international organization to enable individuals to travel across international borders. Travel documents usually assure other governments that the bearer may return to the issuing country, and are often issued in booklet form to allow other governments to place visas as well as entry and exit stamps into them.

The most common travel document is a passport, which usually gives the bearer privileges like visa-free access to certain countries. While national passports are the most common variety of travel document, many states and international organisations issue other varieties of travel documents that allow the holder to travel internationally. For example, stateless persons are not normally issued a national passport, but may be able to obtain a travel document for stateless persons; similarly, refugees may be issued a refugee travel document by its host country, which enables them to travel to countries which recognise the document.

Border control policies typically require travellers to present valid travel documents in order to ascertain their identity, nationality or permanent residence status, and eligibility to enter a given jurisdiction. The most common form of travel document is the passport, a booklet-form identity document issued by national authorities or the governments of certain subnational territories (Note: The local governments of most inhabited British Overseas Territories issue passports to British Overseas Territories citizens resident holding belonger status in the territory concerned, while the Chinese Special Administrative Regions of Hong Kong and Macau issue passports to Chinese citizens holding permanent residence in the region concerned.) containing an individual's personal information as well as space for the authorities of other jurisdictions to affix stamps, visas, or other permits authorising the bearer to enter, reside, or travel within their territory. Certain jurisdictions permit individuals to clear border controls using identity cards, which typically contain similar personal information.

Different countries impose varying travel document regulations and requirements as part of their border control policies and these may vary based on the traveller's mode of transport. For instance, whilst America does not subject passengers departing by land or most boats to any border control, it does require that passengers departing by air hold a valid passport (or certain specific passport-replacing documents). Consequently, even though travellers departing America by air might not be required to have a passport to enter a certain country, they will be required to have a valid passport booklet to board their flight in order to satisfy American immigration authorities at departure. Similarly, although several countries outside the European Economic Area accept national identity cards issued by its member states for entry, Sweden and Finland do not permit their citizens to depart for countries outside the EEA using solely their identity cards.

Many countries normally allow entry to holders of passports of other countries, sometimes requiring a visa also to be obtained, but this is not an automatic right. Many other additional conditions may apply, such as not being likely to become a public charge for financial or other reasons, and the holder not having been convicted of a crime. Where a country does not recognise another, or is in dispute with it, it may prohibit the use of their passport for travel to that other country, or may prohibit entry to holders of that other country's passports, and sometimes to others who have, for example, visited the other country. Some individuals are subject to sanctions which deny them entry into particular countries.

Travel documents may be requested in other circumstances to confirm identification such as checking into a hotel or when changing money to a local currency. Passports and other travel documents have an expiry date, after which it is no longer recognised, but it is recommended that a passport is valid for at least six months as many airlines deny boarding to passengers whose passport has a shorter expiry date, even if the destination country may not have such a requirement.

== Specifications ==
=== Format ===
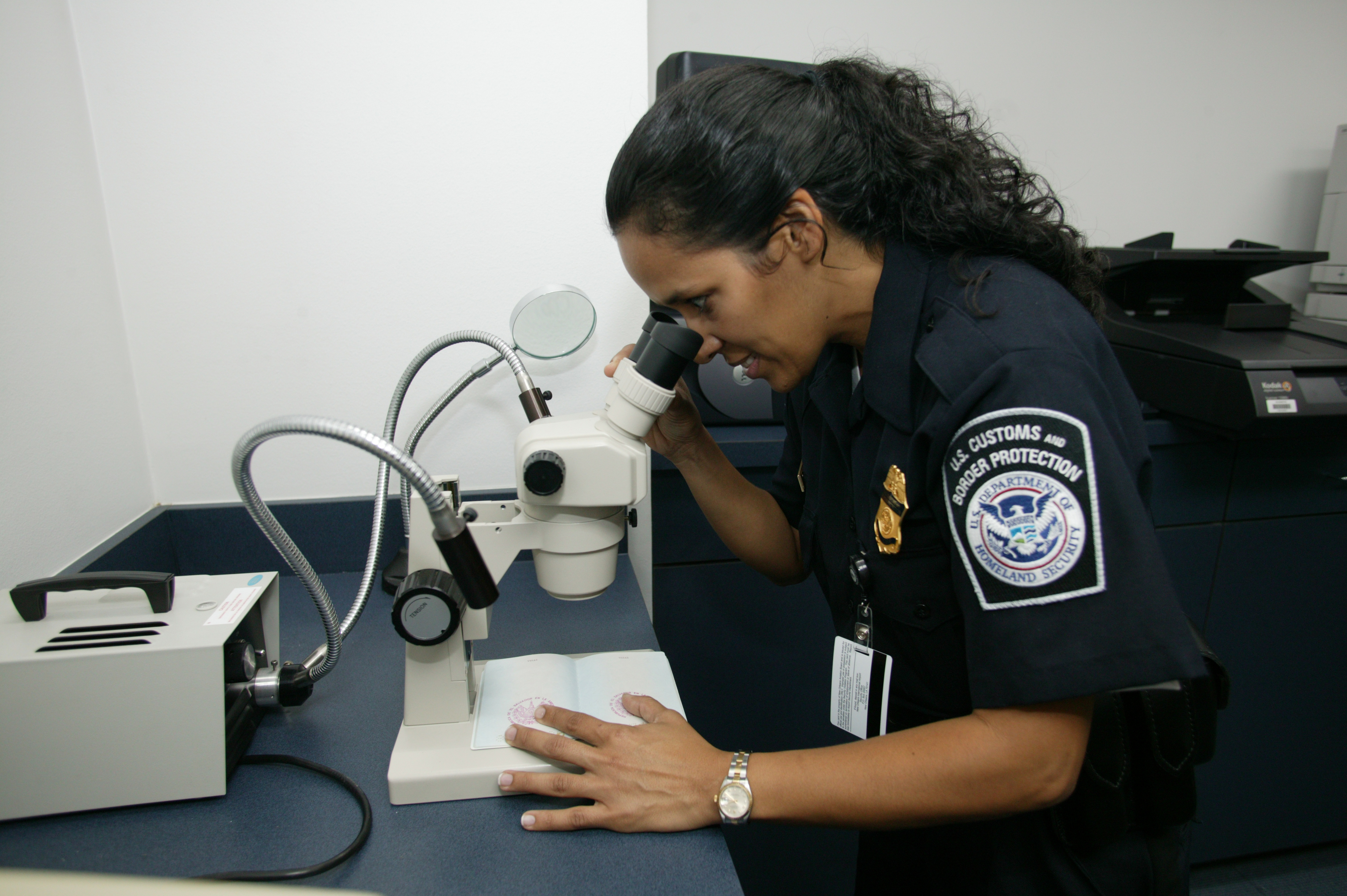
U.S. CBP Office of Field Operations agent checking the authenticity of a travel document at an international airport using a stereo microscope

Travel documents are typically issued in one of two formats:

- Booklets: the most common format for travel documents containing one or two pages with the individual information and endorsements from the issuing government as well as a number of additional pages for passport stamps or visas to be affixed
- Identity cards: a card-sized document containing an individual's identifying information

The ICAO (ICAO) issues standards for both booklet and identity card-format travel documents which are treated as recommendations to national governments. The size of booklet-form travel documents normally complies with the ISO/IEC 7810 ID-3 standard, which specifies a size of 125 by 88 millimetres (4.9 in × 3.5 in). This size is the B7 format. Cards are issued to the ID-1 (credit card sized) standard.

- A standard booklet format travel document includes the cover, which contains the name of the issuing country, a national symbol, a description of the document (e.g., laissez-passer, passport, diplomatic passport), and a biometric symbol, if applicable. Inside, there is a title page, also naming the country. A data page follows, containing information about the bearer and the issuing authority. There are blank pages for visas, and to stamp for entries and exit. Passports have numerical or alphanumerical designators ("serial number") assigned by the issuing authority.
- Machine-readable standards for travel documents have been issued by the ICAO, with an area set aside where most of the information written as text is also printed in a manner suitable for optical character recognition.
- Biometric booklets and cards (or e-passports) have an embedded contactless chip in order to conform to ICAO standards. These chips contain data about the passport bearer, a photographic portrait in digital format, and data about the passport itself. Many countries now issue biometric passports, in order to speed up clearance through immigration and the prevention of identity fraud. These reasons are disputed by privacy advocates.

=== Immigration stamps ===
For immigration control, officials of many countries affix entry and exit stamps to booklet format travel documents. Depending on the country, a stamp can serve different purposes. For example, in the United Kingdom, an immigration stamp in a passport includes the formal leave to enter granted to a person subject to entry control. In other countries, a stamp activates or acknowledges the continuing leave conferred in the passport bearer's entry clearance. Under the Schengen system, a foreign travel document is stamped with a date stamp which does not indicate any duration of stay, indicating that the person is deemed to have permission to remain either for three months or for the period shown on his visa if specified otherwise. Member states of the European Union are not permitted to place a stamp in the passport of a person who is not subject to immigration control. Stamping is prohibited because it is an imposition of a control that the person is not subject to. Some travellers "collect" immigration stamps in their travel documents, and will choose to enter or exit countries via different means (for example, land, sea or air) in order to have different categories of stamps. Some countries, such as Liechtenstein, that do not stamp passports may provide a passport stamp on request for such "memory" purposes. Monaco (at its tourist office) and Andorra (at its border) do this as well. These are official stamps issued by government offices.

== Passports ==
In general, a passport is a travel document that also serves as proof of nationality from the issuing country. Although generally accepted by the majority of countries in the world, some issuing countries expressly exclude the validity of passports from nations that are not recognised by their governments.

Governments around the world issue a variety of passports for different purposes. The most common variety are ordinary passports issued to individual citizens and other nationals. In the past, certain countries issued collective passports (Note: These were issued to defined groups for travel together to particular destinations, such as a group of school children on a school trip.) or family passport. Family passports were typically issued to one passport holder, who may travel alone or with other family members included in the passport. A family member not listed as the passport holder could not use the passport for travel without the passport holder. These passports are essentially obsolete as most countries; including all the EU states, Canada, the United States, and the United Kingdom; require each traveller to have their own passport. Today, passports are typically issued to individual travellers rather than groups. Aside from ordinary passports issued to citizens by national governments, there are a variety of other types of passports by governments in specific circumstances.

== Laissez-passers ==
A laissez-passer (French pronunciation: [lɛse pase]; lit. 'let pass') is a travel document issued by a national government or certain international organisations. A laissez-passer is often for one-way travel to the issuing country for humanitarian reasons only such as Restoring Family Links. Some national governments issue laissez-passers to their own nationals as emergency passports. Others issue them to people who are stateless, or who are unable to obtain a passport from their own government, or whose government is not recognised by the issuing country. During the COVID-19 pandemic, they were issued by French consulates to people who would otherwise be unable to enter the country due to travel restrictions, but were allowed to enter for a single trip on compassionate grounds.

Historically, laissez-passers were commonly issued during wartime and at other periods, literally acting as a pass to allow travel to specific areas, or out of war zones or countries for various officials, diplomatic agents, other representatives or citizens of third countries. In these contexts, a laissez-passer would frequently include quite specific and limited freedom of movement. The form and issuing authority would be more or less standardized, depending on the circumstances. For example, during the early 1950s, the Iraqi government granted permission to its 120,000 Jewish citizens to leave (Operation Ezra and Nehemiah), conditional on their renouncing their citizenship and leaving behind all their properties and assets. The travel document that was issued was the laissez-passer, since an Iraqi passport was no longer possible.

The most common laissez-passer is the United Nations laissez-passer (UNLP) issued by the United Nations under the provisions of Article VII of the 1946 Convention on the Privileges and Immunities of the United Nations in its offices in New York and Geneva, as well as by the ILO. The UNLP is issued to UN and ILO staff as well as staff members of international organisations such as the WHO, the IAEA, the World Tourism Organization, the Comprehensive Nuclear-Test-Ban Treaty Organisation Preparatory Commission, the Organisation for the Prohibition of Chemical Weapons (OPCW), the WTO, the International Monetary Fund, the International Organisation for Migration (IOM), the World Intellectual Property Organization and the World Bank. The document is written in English and French, two of the six working languages of the United Nations. The UNLP is a valid travel document, which can be used like a national passport (in connection with travel on official missions only). However, UNLP holders often encounter immigration officials who are unfamiliar with the document and require them to show a national passport in addition. As with national passports, some countries and regions accept it for entry without the need for a visa (e.g., Turkmenistan, Kenya, the United Kingdom, Schengen Area, Lebanon, etc.), while other countries may require a visa before accepting it for entry (depending on the nationality of the UNLP holder).

Similarly, the European Union laissez-passer is issued to civil servants and members of the institutions of the European Union. It is proof of privileges and immunities the holders enjoy. The document is valid in all countries of the European Union as well as in over 100 other countries.

The Interpol Travel Document is a document similar to the United Nations and European Union laissez-passer and is issued to Interpol officers for travel to Interpol member countries. They are intended to reduce response times for personnel deployed to assist with transnational criminal investigations, major events or emergency situations by waiving normal visa requirements. The travel documents consist of a Passport booklet and an e-Identification Card identifying the holder as an Interpol officer, granting them special immigration status when travelling on official Interpol duties to participating member countries.

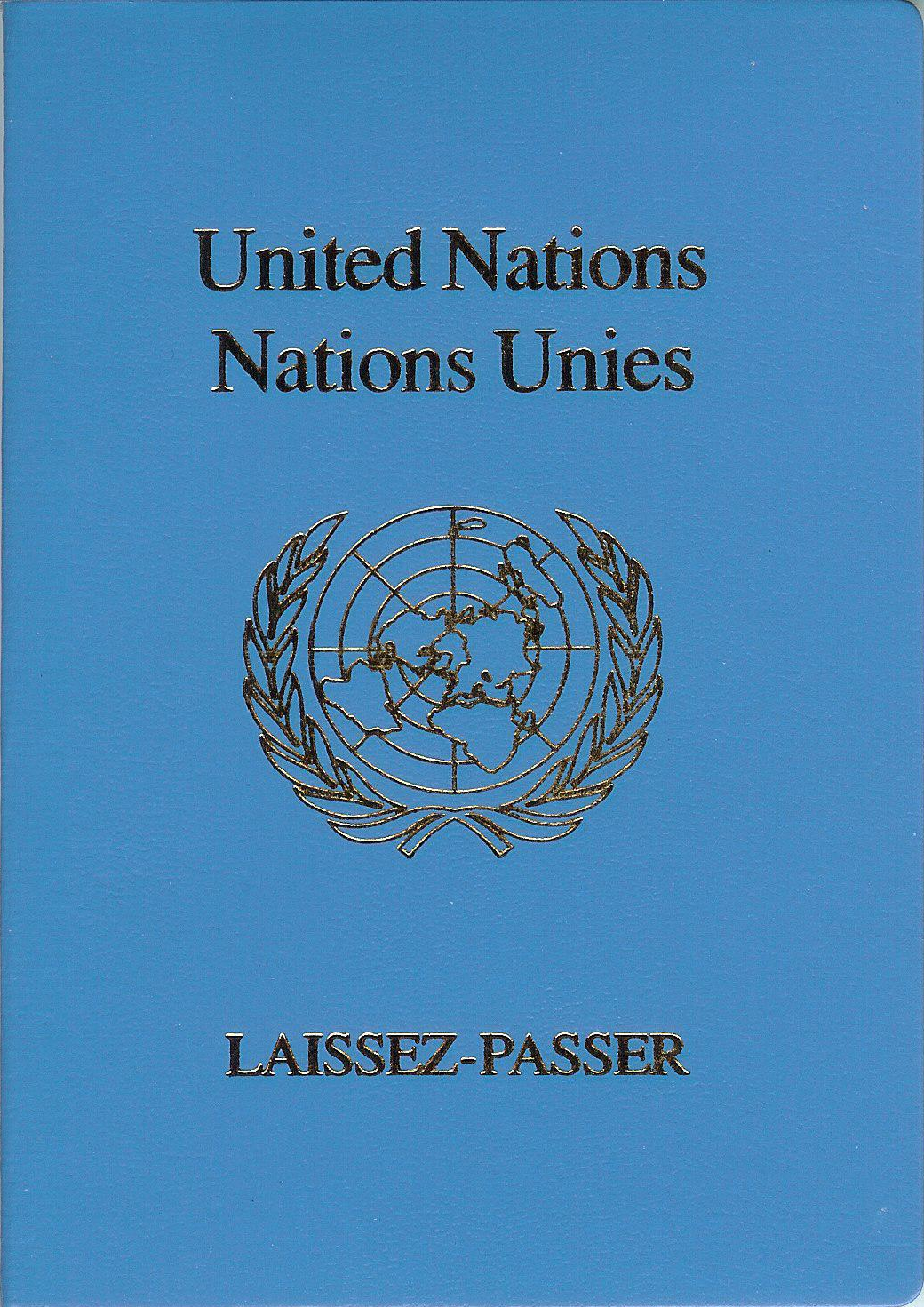
The front cover of a blue machine-readable United Nations laissez-passer

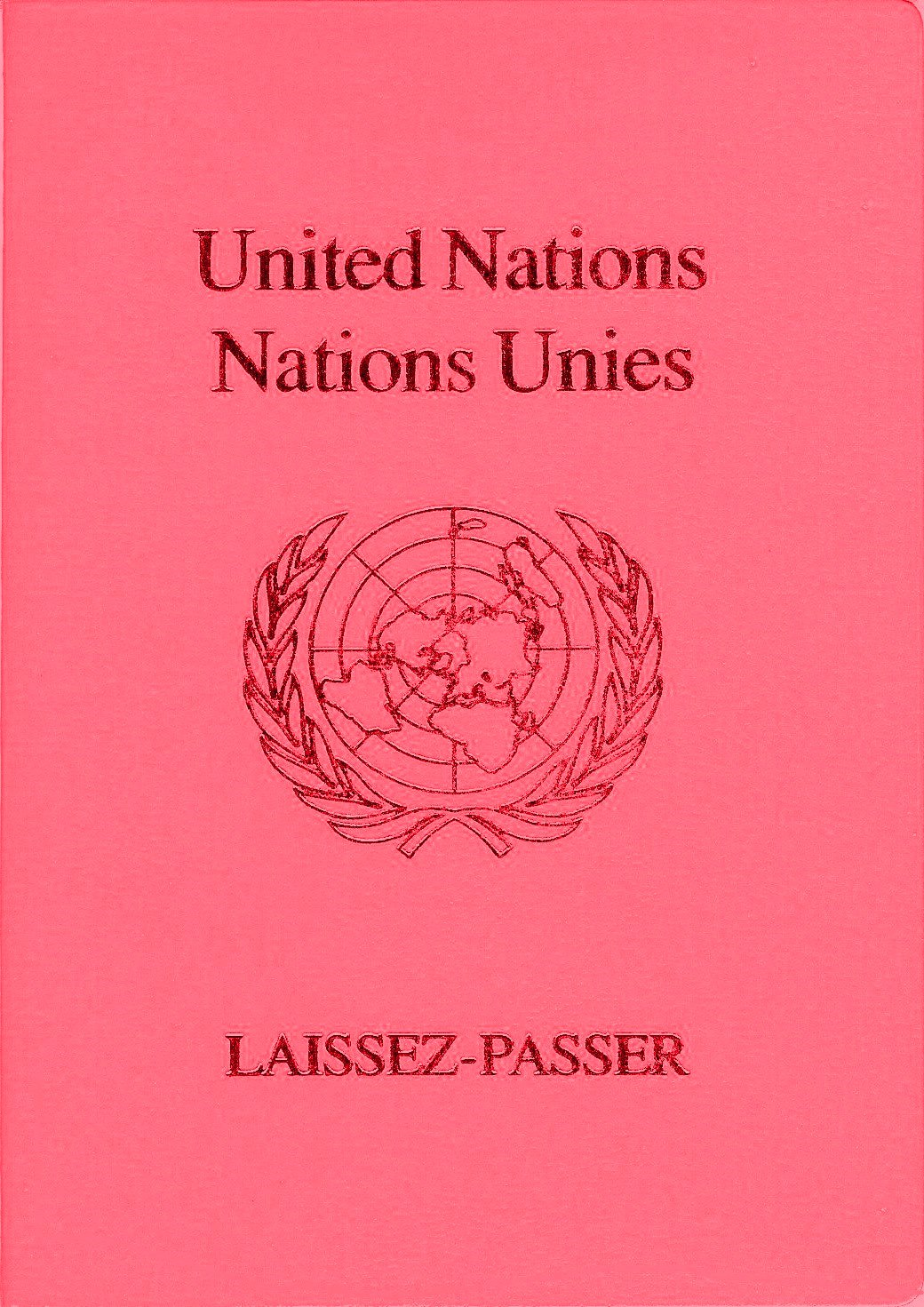
The front cover of a red machine-readable United Nations diplomatic laissez-passer

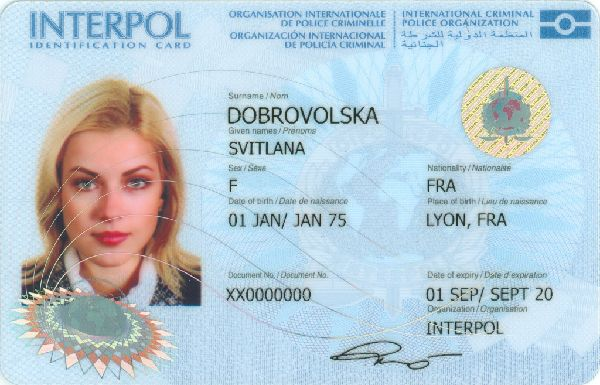
The front of the card-form Interpol Travel Document

Laissez-passer documents may also be issued to goods or other non-living objects to facilitate their transport across international borders. For instance, the Agreement on the Transfer of Corpses sets out rules whereby human corpses may be issued laissez-passer documents in order for a body to be buried or cremated in a country different from the one in which the person died.

== Identity cards ==
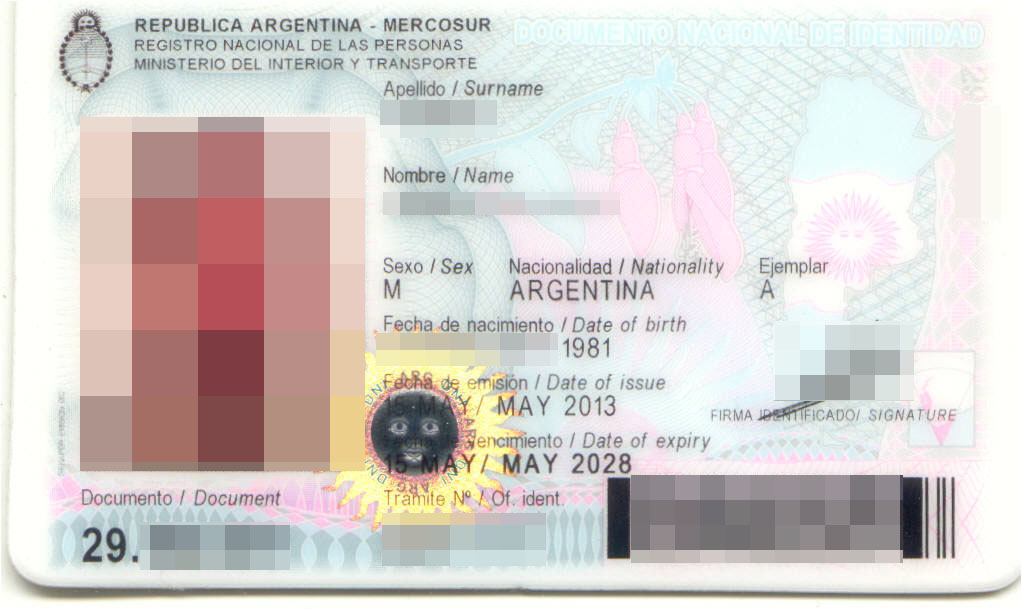
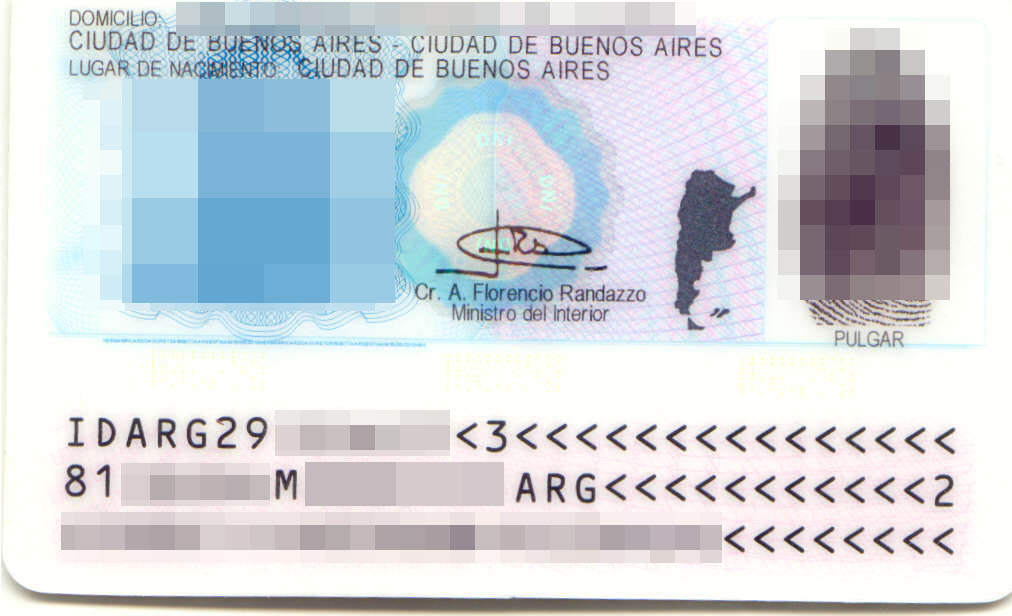
Argentine National ID card valid for travel to other Mercosur countries in lieu of a passport

Certain jurisdictions permit the use of identity cards to clear border controls. For instance, when travelling between India and Nepal or Bhutan, Indian citizens may utilise national voter ID cards, ration cards, or national identity cards. Indian citizens may also obtain identity slips at the Indian consulate in Phuentsholing if they intend to proceed beyond city limits as Phuentsholing, the financial capital of Bhutan, is de facto within India's visa and customs area. When travelling to India, citizens of Nepal and Bhutan can utilise similar documents. Children may use birth certificates as proof of identity. Similarly, many Mercosur countries reciprocally permit travel using identity cards.

Permanent residents of Hong Kong and Macau SARs do not require passports when travelling in either region regardless of their citizenship status. Hong Kong residents can enjoy 1 year visa-free access to Macau and Macau residents can enjoy 180 days visa-free access to Hong Kong. But such non-permanent residents of Hong Kong and Macau who possess a Hong Kong Document of Identity for Visa Purposes or Visit Permit for Residents of Macao to HKSAR to travel in either region with identity cards for up to 30 days.

In Western Europe, travel using identity cards is relatively common for citizens of the European Economic Area and adjacent territories. (Note: Albania accepts national ID cards or passports for entry from nationals of the EU, EFTA, Bosnia and Herzegovina, Kazakhstan, Kosovo, Monaco, Montenegro, North Macedonia, San Marino and Singapore.; Bosnia and Herzegovina accepts national ID cards or passports for entry from citizens of the EU, EFTA, Monaco, Montenegro, San Marino and Serbia.; North Macedonia accepts national ID cards or passports for entry from nationals of the EU, EFTA, Albania, Montenegro, Bosnia and Herzegovina, Kosovo and Serbia.; Montenegro accepts national ID cards or passports for entry from nationals of the EU, EFTA, Albania, Bosnia and Herzegovina, Kosovo, Monaco, North Macedonia, San Marino and Serbia.; Serbia accepts national ID cards or passports for entry from nationals of the EU, EFTA (except Liechtenstein), Bosnia and Herzegovina, Montenegro and North Macedonia.; Turkey allows citizens of Belgium, France, Georgia, Germany, Greece, Italy, Liechtenstein, Luxembourg, Malta, the Netherlands, the partly recognized Turkish Republic of Northern Cyprus, Portugal, Spain, Switzerland, and Ukraine to enter with a valid national ID card.; Ukraine reciprocally accepts for travel national ID cards issued to citizens of Georgia and Turkey.; EU and Turkish citizens are allowed to enter the partly recognized Turkish Republic of Northern Cyprus with a valid ID card.; EU and Turkish citizens are allowed to enter Georgia with a valid ID card.; Turkish citizens are allowed to enter Moldova with a valid ID card.; Turkish citizens are allowed to enter Ukraine and Azerbaijan with a valid ID card if arriving directly from Turkey.) Within the Schengen Area, there are limited border controls in place and national identity cards may be used to clear them. Since August 2021, identity cards within the European Economic Area have been standardised under EU Regulation 2019/1157. The new standard is intended to replace and harmonise the various identity card models currently in use across the European Union (EU) and the European Economic Area (EEA). (Note: The legal acquis has been identified as EEA-relevant by the EU Commission, which makes it under scrutiny for incorporation into the EEA Agreement by Iceland, Liechtenstein and Norway. However, the legal basis rely on Article 21 of the Treaty on the Functioning of the European Union, an article which is not reflected in the EEA Agreement.)

Citizens of Lebanon and Jordan do not require passports when travelling in either country if they are carrying ID cards, while citizens of the Cooperation Council for the Arab States of the Gulf countries need only national ID cards (also referred to as civil ID cards) to cross the borders of council countries.

In North America, American citizens may travel to Canada or certain islands in the Caribbean using the passport card while children holding Canadian or American citizenship may travel between America and Canada using birth certificates under certain circumstances. An Enhanced Driving Licence is an identity card issued by provincial and state authorities in Canada and America that, in addition to serving as a valid driving licence, enables its bearer to clear land border controls between the two countries. It is not valid for air travel and does not permit its holder to clear border controls at airports. Certain provinces and states may issue similar enhanced versions of regional identity cards issued to individuals who do not drive. Similarly, a Border Crossing Card (BCC) is an identity document issued by the American government to nationals of Mexico. As a standalone document, the BCC allows its holder to visit border areas (Note: Defined as follows: California and Texas: within 40 km of the border; Arizona within 121 km of the border; New Mexico within 89 km of the border or up to Interstate 10, whichever is further north) when entering by land or sea directly from Mexico for up to 30 days and, when presented with a valid Mexican passport, functions as a B1/B2 visa for entry to any part of the United States by any means of transportation. Additionally, Mexico permits the use of identity cards issued by Mexican consulates overseas, voter ID cards, and CURP cards by Mexican citizens entering the country, which has the effect of enabling individuals who use the BCC or an American Permanent Resident Card as a standalone travel document when travelling to re-enter Mexico without a passport.

Members of the East African Community (composed of Kenya, Tanzania, Uganda, Rwanda and Burundi) may issue an East African passport. East African passports are recognised by only the five members, and are only used for travel between or among those countries. The requirements for eligibility are less rigorous than are the requirements for national passports used for other international travel. The member states of the Economic Community of West African States (ECOWAS) do not require passports for their citizens when moving within the community. National ID cards are sufficient. The member states are Benin, Burkina Faso, Cape Verde, Gambia, Ghana, Guinea, Guinea Bissau, Ivory Coast, Liberia, Mali, Niger, Nigeria, Senegal, Sierra Leone, and Togo.

Many Central American and South American nationals can travel within their respective regional economic zones, such as Mercosur and the Andean Community of Nations, or on a bilateral basis (e.g., between Chile and Peru, between Brazil and Chile), without passports, presenting instead their national ID cards, or, for short stays, their voter-registration cards. In some cases this travel must be done overland rather than by air. Mercosur citizens can travel visa-free and only with their ID cards between the member and associated countries (Colombia, Ecuador, Peru, Bolivia, Chile, Paraguay, Uruguay, Brazil and Argentina).

== Travel documents for permanent residents ==
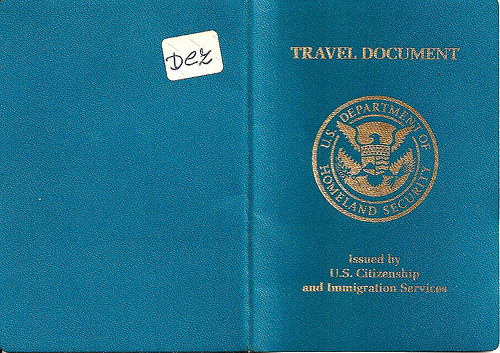
The American re-entry permit is a travel document for permanent residents issued on request.

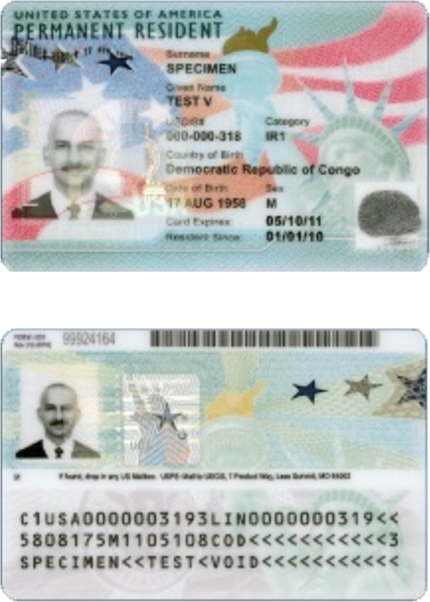
Green Card issued to all American permanent residents

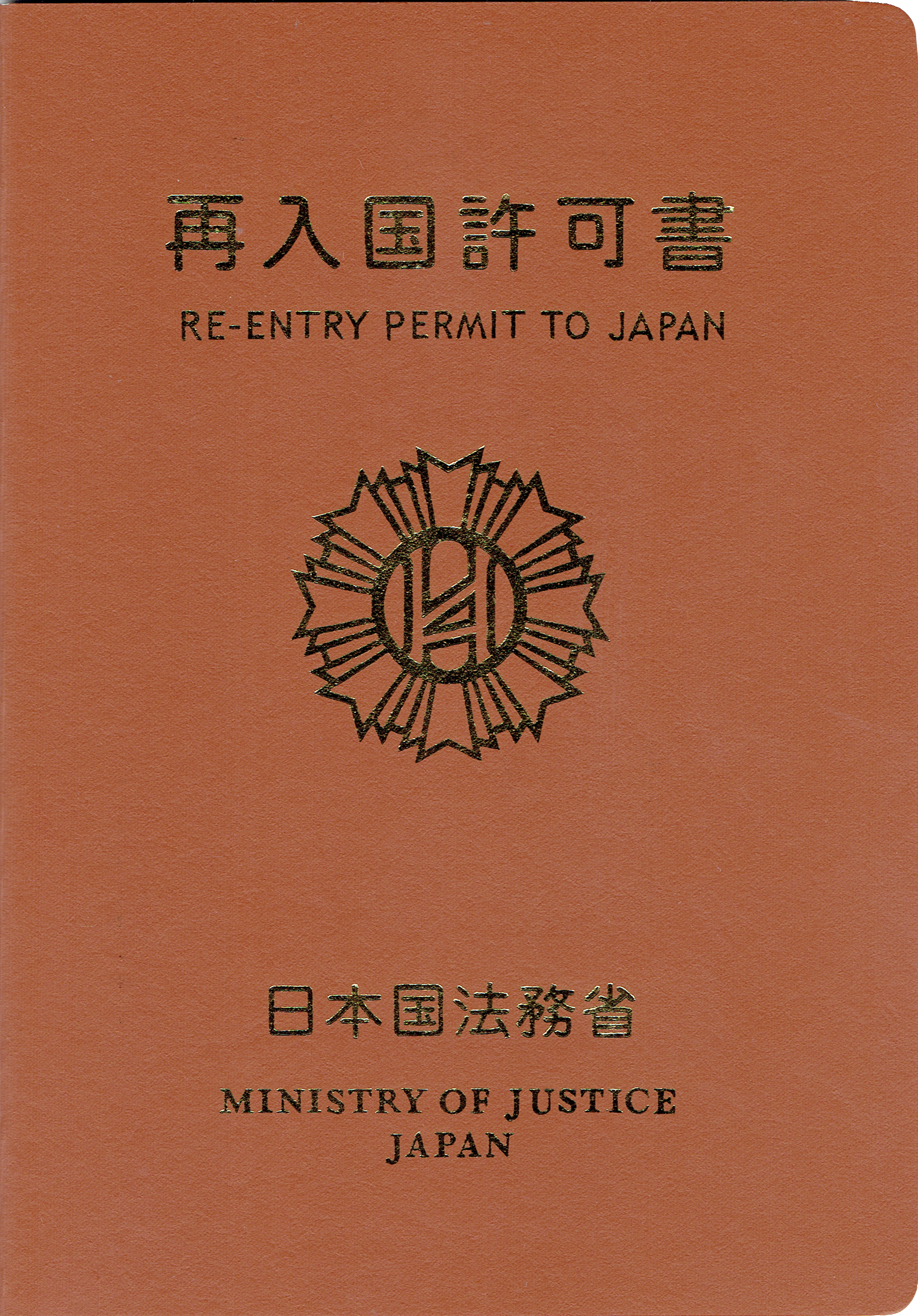
A booklet-form Japan re-entry permit issued to special permanent residents of Japan

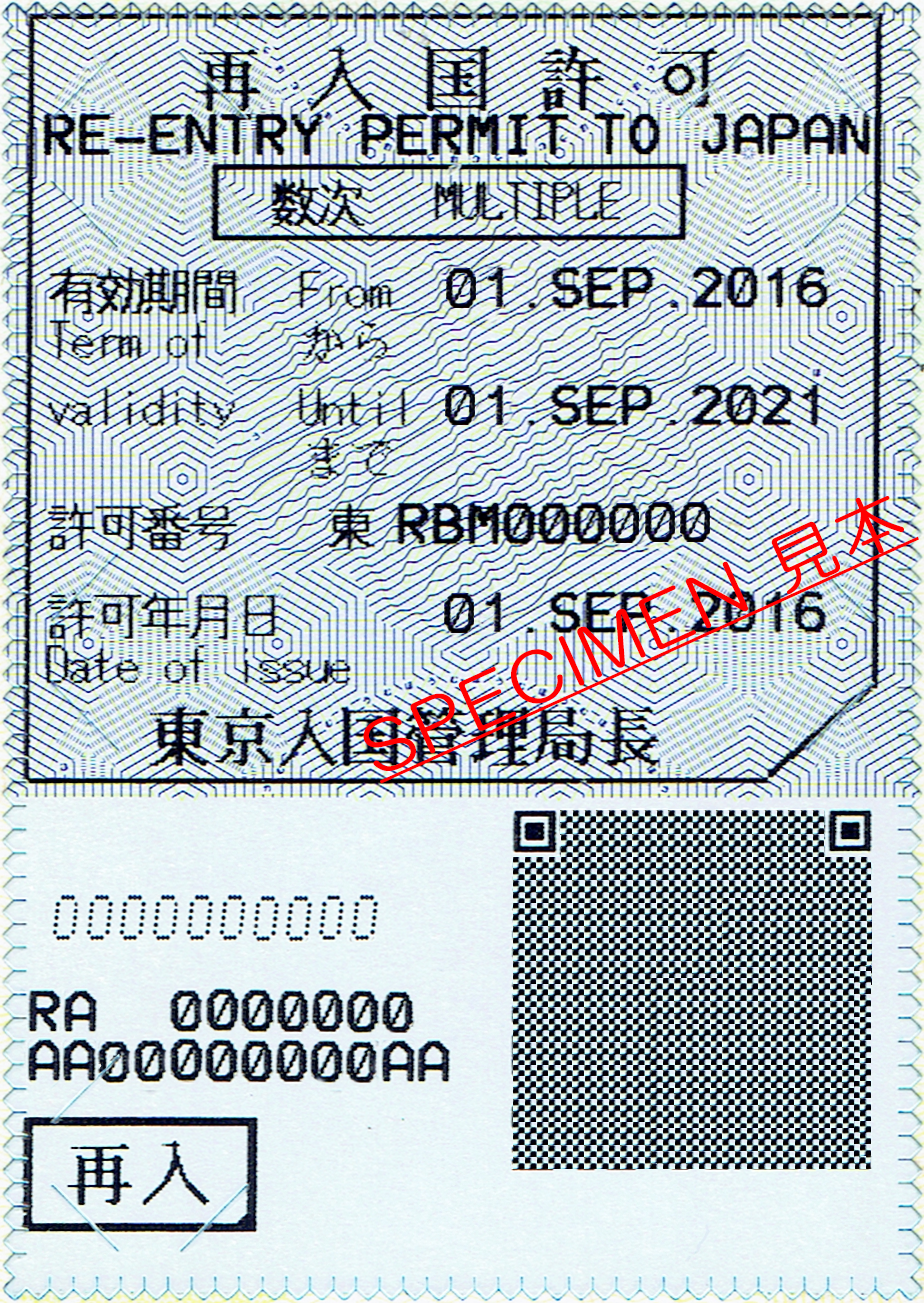
A sticker/stamp form Japanese Re-entry Permit issued to ordinary permanent residents

Some countries issue travel documents to permanent residents (i.e. foreign citizens permitted to reside there indefinitely) or other non-citizens, usually for re-entry but also occasionally valid for international travel.

The American Re-Entry Permit is an example of such a document. Valid for international travel, it is issued to lawful permanent residents temporarily expatriating overseas. Unlike the "Green Card" issued to all permanent residents, this document is not mandatory. The American "Green Card", on its own or in conjunction with a passport, is valid for international travel albeit not to the same extent as the re-entry permit. Both documents can be utilised to clear American border controls regardless of the bearer's nationality, thus resulting in America not requiring permanent residents to hold a passport from their home country in order to remain lawfully present or to lawfully enter. (Note: Since Mexico permits the use of identity cards issued by Mexican consulates overseas and other documents demonstrating Mexican citizenship for its citizens entering the country, Mexicans holding permanent residence in America are effectively not required by either country to hold a Mexican passport when travelling between the two countries)

Singapore issues national identity cards to permanent residents in the same manner as it does to citizens, but additionally requires any permanent resident travelling abroad to hold a valid electronic re-entry permit and a passport or other travel document from their home country. Similarly, Hong Kong and Macau issue permanent resident cards to all permanent residents including those without Chinese citizenship.

While Canada does not issue a mandatory national identity card to its citizens, it issues the Canada permanent resident card, which serves as a valid travel document for Canadian permanent residents to clear border controls in the country. Additionally, Canada requires any Canadian Permanent Residents entering the country by air to use their Permanent Resident Card or a special document authorising their return. No such requirement is imposed on a permanent resident entering by land or sea. Canadian citizens are prohibited from using a foreign passport to enter the country.

Japan issues a re-entry permit for individuals holding permanent resident status. This document is issued in one of two formats depending on the nationality status of the holder. For ordinary permanent residents holding a passport from their country of citizenship, it is issued as a stamp or sticker affixed to a page on its holder's passport. For members of the Chōsen-seki community and descendants of Taiwanese immigrants whose ancestors moved to Japan when Korea and Taiwan were Japanese colonies, who are classified as special permanent residents, a booklet-form Japan re-entry Permit is issued for international travel. While special permanent residents are treated by Japanese authorities as similar to Japanese citizens in most regards, including access to consular assistance, they are unable to participate in elections or exercise other rights reserved specifically for Japanese citizens. Nevertheless, they enjoy greater legal rights than ordinary permanent residents. For example, special permanent residents are not subject to immigration control under Article 5 of the Immigration Control Act 1951. During the coronavirus pandemic of 2020, special permanent residents were allowed the right of return, while other permanent residents were denied permission to enter Japan.

== Seafarers' identity documents ==
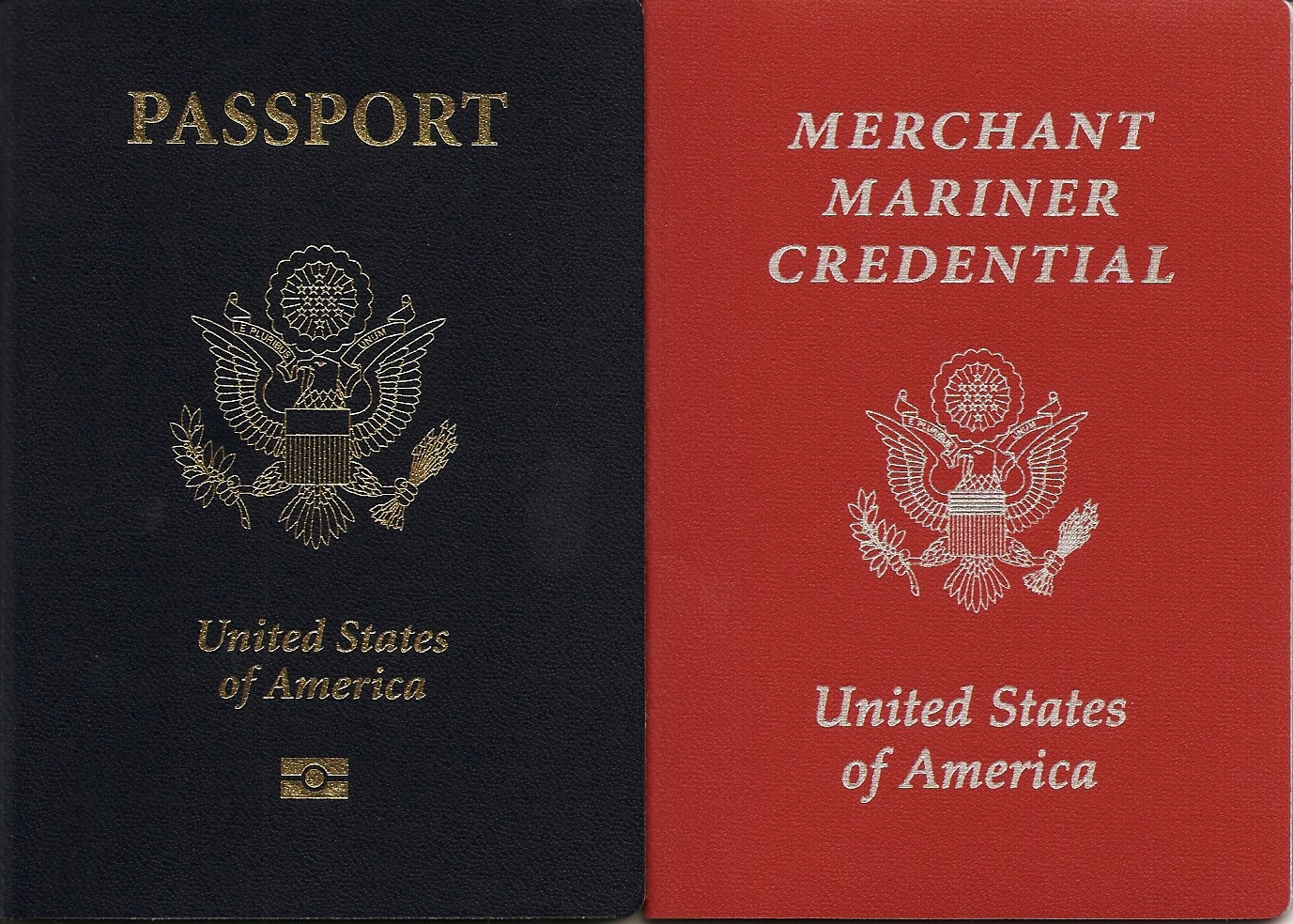
Comparison between a passport and a seafarers' identity document

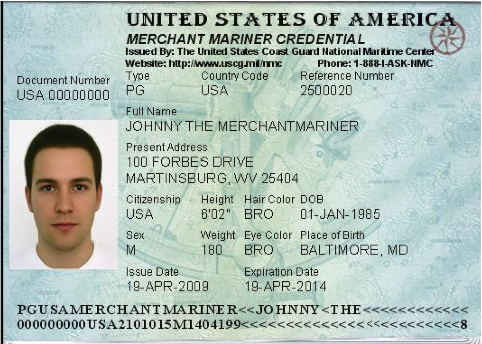
Data page of a seafarers' identity document

A seafarers' identity document (also known as a seaman's identity document or merchant mariner credential) is a travel document issued to individuals authorised to serve as crew members aboard vessels engaged in international voyages. Like an ordinary passport, it contains its holder's personal information and is generally issued by the same authorities. Additionally, it contains information as to its bearer's qualifications to serve on a ship's crew. In certain jurisdictions, of seafarers' identity documents are entitled to simplified visa requirements when travelling on duty. For instance, mainland China maintains a simplified visa regime for holders of certain countries' seafarers' identity documents travelling on duty.

== Travel documents for refugees, stateless persons and non-citizens ==
While the majority of international travellers clear border controls using passports or national identity cards, a wide variety of travel documents are utilised by individuals who cannot have a national passport, ranging from stateless individuals and refugees to individuals affected by international border disputes or other legal complexities. Such travel documents are typically subject to greater scrutiny by border control authorities, with countries such as Singapore imposing strict controls on stateless individuals and refugees regardless of the issuing country of their travel documents.

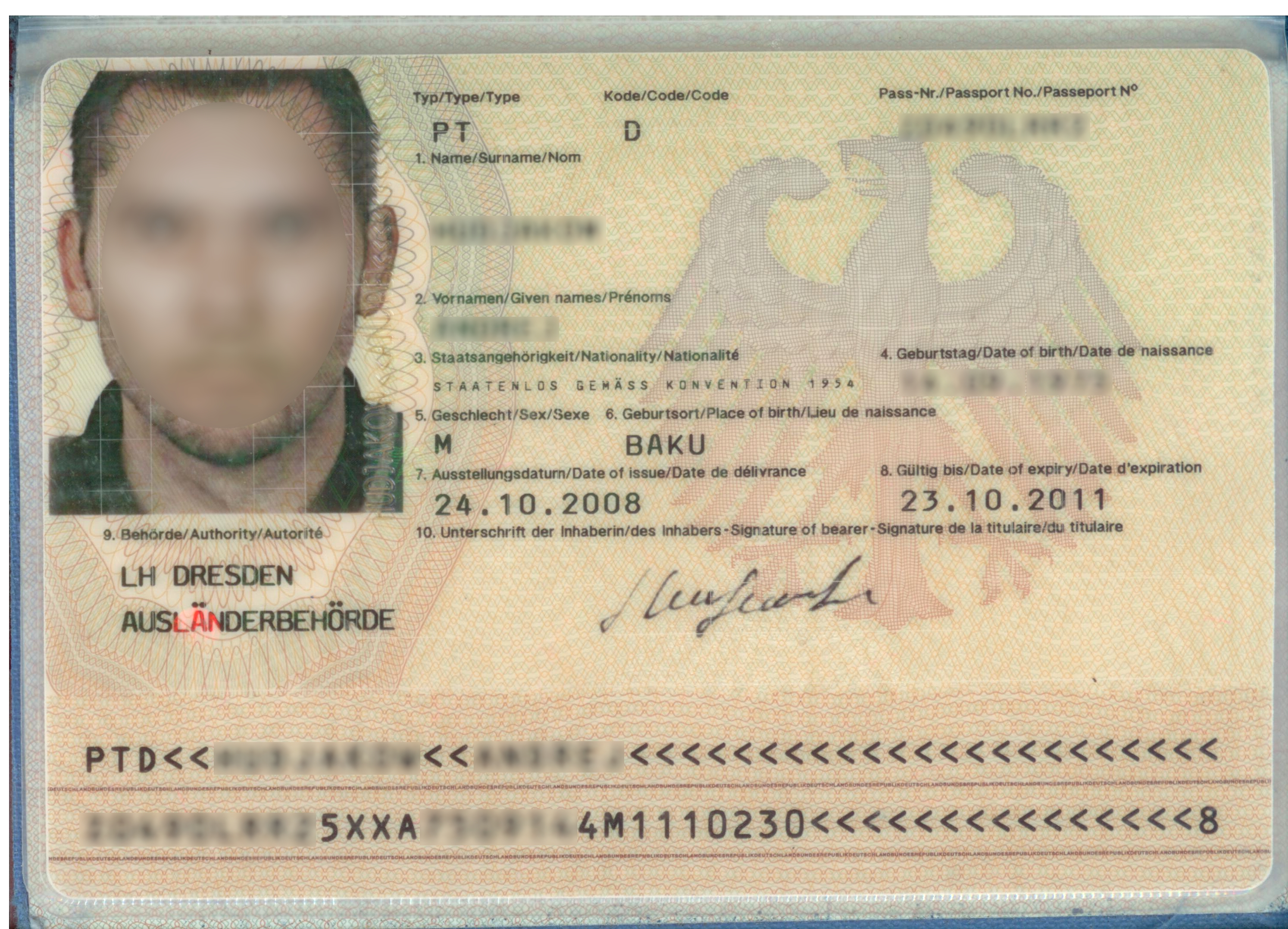
A 1954 Convention travel document issued in Germany in 2008

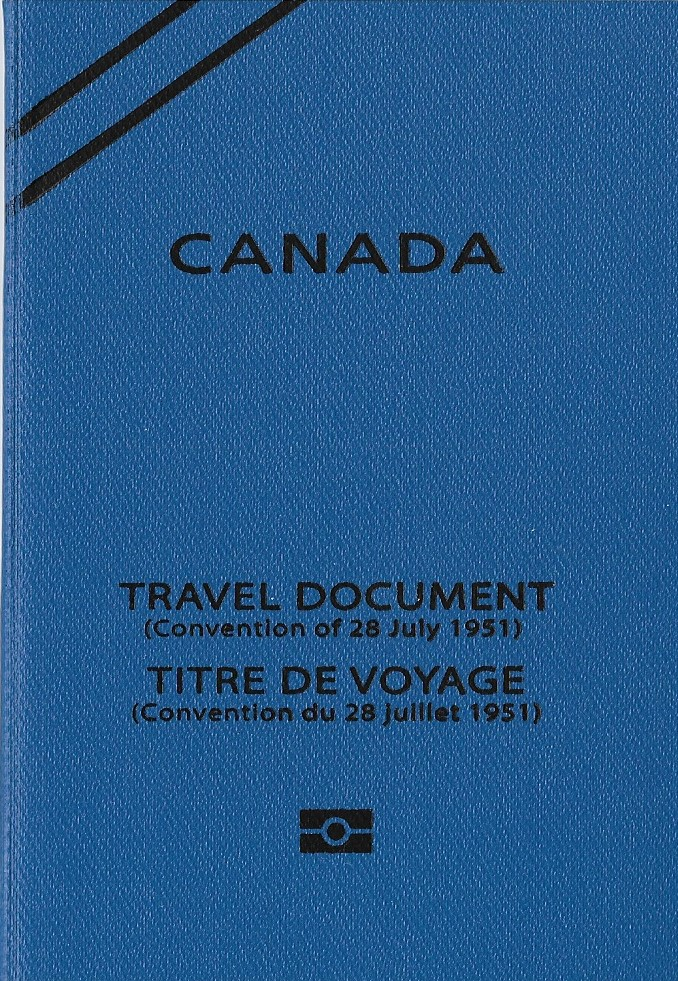
Canadian Refugee Travel Document

Some countries issue what they call a Certificate of Identity to non-citizens residing within their borders who are unable to obtain a passport from their state of nationality, such as stateless persons and refugees. Some states also issue certificates of identity to their own citizens as a form of emergency passport or otherwise in lieu of a passport. The visa requirements of certificates of identity may be different from those of regular passports.

Many countries also issue special travel documents for stateless persons, called 1954 Convention travel documents, and for refugees, called 1951 Convention travel documents.

A stateless person's travel document or 1954 Convention travel document is a certificate of identity issued to a stateless person in circumstances of any difficulties in gaining a travel document from their country of origin.

Similarly, a refugee travel document or 1951 Convention travel document is a certificate of identity issued to a refugee by the state in which they normally reside in allowing them to travel outside that state and to return there. Refugees are unlikely to be able to obtain passports from their state of nationality (from which they have sought asylum) and therefore need travel documents so that they might engage in international travel. The 145 states which are parties to the 1951 Convention Relating to the Status of Refugees are obliged to issue travel documents to refugees lawfully resident in their territory. Refugee travel documents are passport-like booklets. Their cover normally bears the words "Travel Document" in English and French (and often in the language of the issuing state), as well as the date of the convention: 28 July 1951.

== Particular national cases ==
Documents with other names and formats are issued in many jurisdictions across the globe. For instance, Singapore permanent residents who are stateless are issued booklet-form Certificates of Identity in lieu of a passport, while Indonesia issues the Paspor Orang Asing to its stateless permanent residents. The Hong Kong Document of Identity for Visa Purposes and Macau Travel Permit serve a similar function in China's special administrative regions and are issued to stateless permanent residents and to Chinese citizens temporarily residing in the region who hold neither permanent residence of Hong Kong or Macau nor residence status in the mainland and are thereby ineligible for any category of Chinese passport.

The Indian government issues non-convention certificates of identity to members of the large Tibetan exile community and to other stateless residents of India. Certificates of identity are routinely issued upon request of the Dalai Lama's Tibetan government in exile based in Dharamsala. This document is accepted by most countries border control policies in lieu of a passport, although it is not a machine readable document. Tibetans travelling to areas administered by the Republic of China or People's Republic of China may be required to use a ROC passport without right of abode or a Chinese Travel Document instead. When issued to a Tibetan residing in India, a certificate of identity is invariably endorsed as being valid for return to India and therefore exempts the holder from requiring a visa to clear Indian border controls upon re-entry.

Between 2000 and 2008, the United Nations Interim Administration Mission in Kosovo (UNMIK) issued the UNMIK Travel Document, a non-convention travel document, to residents of Kosovo (Note: Kosovo is the subject of a territorial dispute between the Republic of Kosovo and the Republic of Serbia. The Republic of Kosovo unilaterally declared independence on 17 February 2008. Serbia continues to claim it as part of its own sovereign territory. The two governments began to normalise relations in 2013, as part of the 2013 Brussels Agreement. Kosovo is currently recognised as an independent state by 110 out of the 193 United Nations member states. In total, 118 UN member states have recognised Kosovo at some point, of which eight later withdrew their recognition.) who were not able to obtain a passport from Yugoslavia, for the purpose of foreign travel. After the government of Kosovo started to issue their own passports, the UNMIK ceased issuing them. Existing UNMIC travel documents retained their validity until expiry (the last ones expired in 2010). In light of the disputed nationality status of residents of Kosovo, the UNMIK travel document did not contain information on nationality. The document was labelled UNMIK travel document/titre de voyage on the cover, contained 32 pages, and was valid for 2 years. It contained a machine readable strip. As the issuing authority was the UNMIK, the document had the official three-letter code "UNK" where normally the country code is placed. It was the only other travel document issued by the United Nations besides the United Nations Laissez-Passer, which is mainly issued to employees of the UN and its specialised agencies. As the status of Kosovo was and remains controversial, the document was not widely accepted and, although America did accept the UNMIK Travel Document, it did not place visa stickers in the document itself, but on a detached sheet.

=== Chinese Travel Document ===
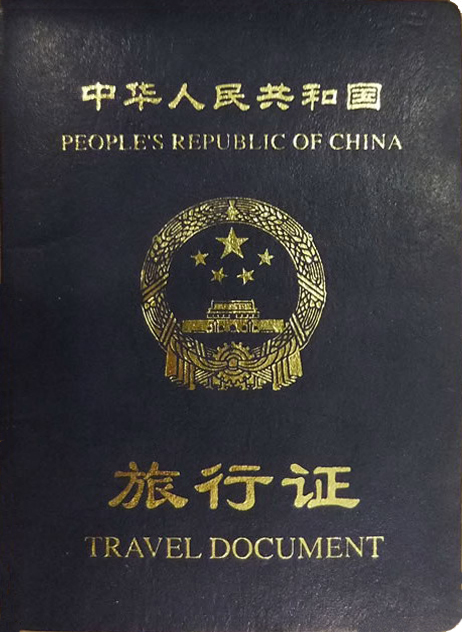
Chinese Travel Document

The Chinese Government requires certain Chinese citizens to use the Chinese Travel Document (Chinese: 中国旅行证; pinyin: Zhōnghuá Rénmín Gònghéguó Lǚxíng Zhèng) when entering the mainland. Circumstances in which the CTD is required include:

- When it is "inconvenient", "unnecessary", or not permitted to issue a People's Republic of China passport to Chinese nationals.
- Chinese nationals residing in mainland China who lost their passport while travelling abroad may apply for this document as an emergency passport for returning to China.
- Chinese nationals who are permanent residents of Hong Kong and Macau intending to enter mainland China directly from other countries without a Home Return Permit.
- Taiwanese residents of the areas administered by the Republic of China (Note: The area under the definition consists of: Taiwan (Chinese: 台灣); Penghu (Chinese: 澎湖); Kinmen (Chinese: 金門; pinyin: Jīnmén); Matsu Islands (Chinese: 馬祖列島; pinyin: Mǎzǔ Lièdǎo); Other nearby islands) intending to enter mainland China or Hong Kong directly from other countries, who are Chinese nationals according to Chinese law. Travelling to Hong Kong, however, requires a separate application for a visa-like entry permit.
- Chinese nationals born abroad who acquired Chinese nationality at birth in accordance with the Nationality Law of the People's Republic of China through jus sanguinis. The Chinese Travel Document is issued as a Chinese identification and travel document.
- Chinese nationals born in China who do not have a Hukou in China and who have exited China using an exit permit. This could include a person who holds a non-Chinese passport.

=== Israeli Travel Document in lieu of a National Passport ===
A Travel Document in Lieu of National Passport (Hebrew: תעודת מעבר במקום דרכון לאומי Teudat Ma'avar bimkom Darkon Leumi) may be issued to an Israeli citizen in a number of circumstances. (Note: A new immigrant to Israel acquires Israeli nationality immediately when issued with a certificate of immigration (תעודת עולה, teudat oleh) upon arrival in the country, but this nationality may be waived with retroactive effect to the moment the certificate of immigration was issued if such an application is filed with the ministry of the interior within 90 days following the issuance of the certificate of immigration. During these 90 days, a new immigrant cannot apply for an Israeli passport or travel document unless they file a waiver of the right to waive the automatic acquisition of Israeli nationality. Prior to 2017, a new immigrant could not be issued with an Israeli passport until they had resided in Israel for a period of at least 270 days following the issuance of their certificate of immigration. In 2017, this restriction was lifted when the passport act was modified by the Knesset.; Israeli citizens with criminal record.; Israeli citizens who have lost or destroyed over three passports.; Israeli citizens who have lost their passport during an overseas trip.; Israeli citizens who are returning to Israel by decision of the Israeli government.)

They are normally valid for two years, and not for more than five years. The issuance of travel documents instead of passports became prevalent in the 1990s as the Israeli government reacted to a wave of Russian organised crime gangs who immigrated to Israel and began using Israeli passports for their activities. Individuals holding such travel documents may face greater scrutiny by border control officers overseas as well as ineligibility for visa free entry to certain jurisdictions.

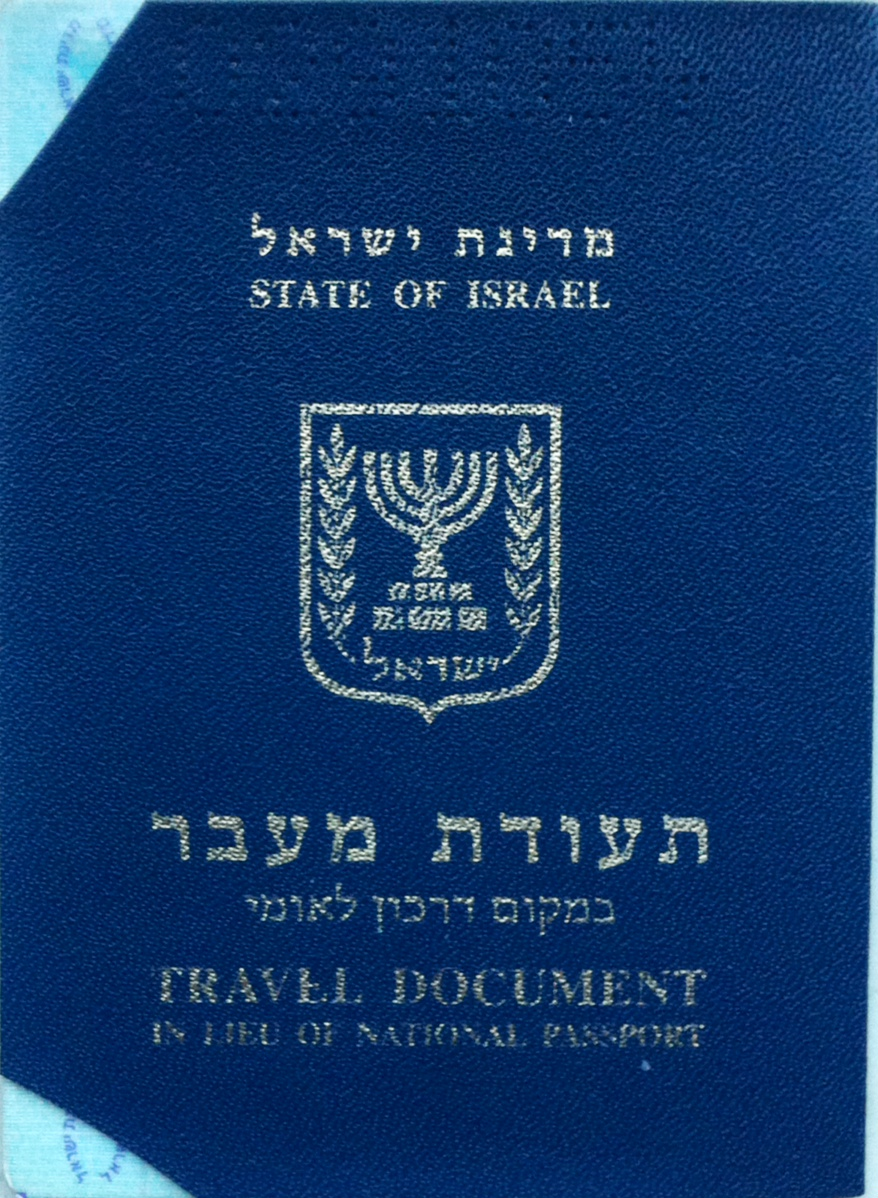
Israeli travel document front cover

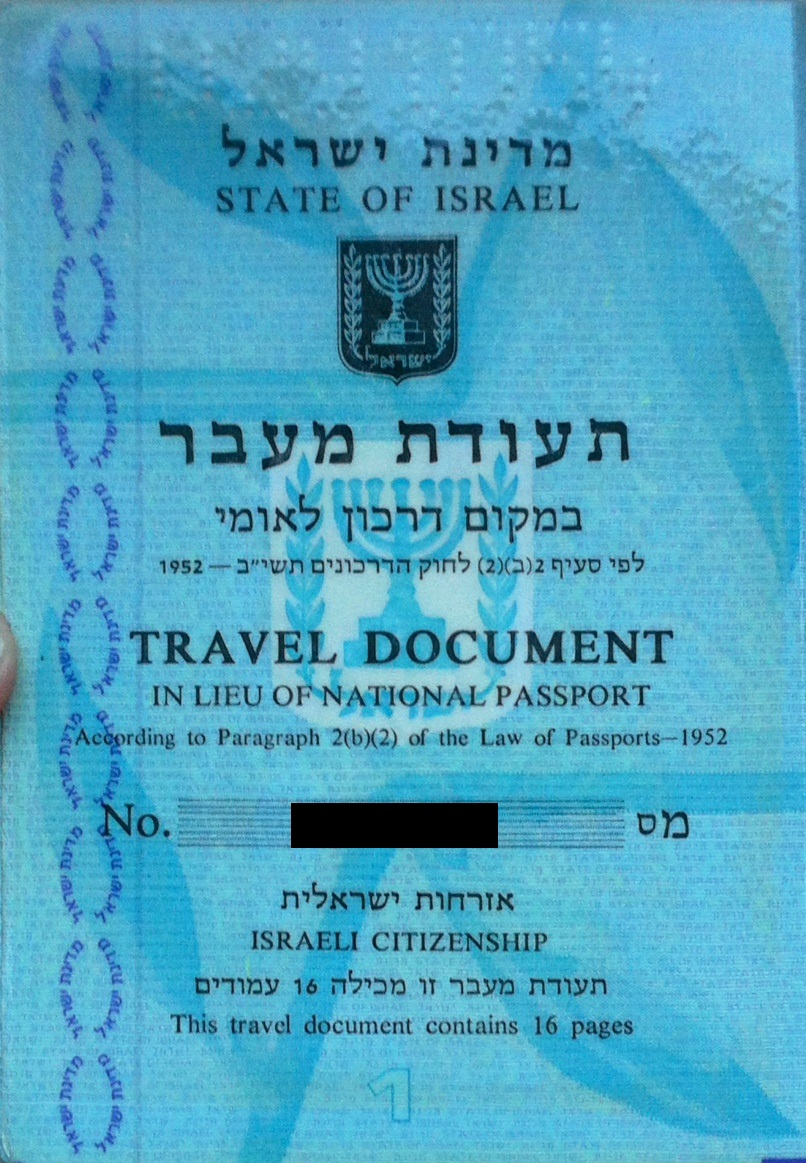
The first page within the Israeli travel document

== International Certificate of Vaccination ==
New cover of Carte Jaune issued by the Philippines since 2021

The International Certificate of Vaccination or Prophylaxis (ICVP), also known as the Carte Jaune, is an official vaccination report created by the WHO. As a travel document, it is a kind of medical passport that is recognised internationally and may be required for entry to certain countries where there are increased health risks for travellers (see section on biosecurity).

Various schemes for health passports or vaccination certificates have been proposed for people who have been vaccinated against COVID-19. The IATA Travel Pass application for smart phones, introduced by the International Air Transport Association (IATA) in early 2021, is a mobile app designed to standardise the health verification process confirming whether aeroplane passengers have been vaccinated against, or tested negative for, COVID-19 prior to travel. The application is intended to eventually replace the Carte Jaune and to facilitate the verification of vaccination for Yellow Fever and other diseases prescribed by border control policies in various countries. Trials of the application are carried out by a number of airlines including Singapore Airlines, Emirates, Qatar Airways, Etihad and Air New Zealand.

Due to the prevalence of counterfeit certificates in some places, several countries, including Zimbabwe, Zambia, and Nigeria, have been developing digital certificates to be used in conjunction with and to authenticate an ICVP. As of July 2019, Nigeria requires its citizens to have its digital "e-Yellow Card" for travel outside the country. The card has a QR code that can be scanned to verify its validity. This requirement does not affect travellers from other countries with valid ICVPs, but those arriving in Nigeria who have not been vaccinated for yellow fever may receive the vaccine and the e-Yellow Card upon arrival.

== Indigenous nations ==
=== Indigenous passports ===
Various indigenous nations in the Americas, as well as the Aboriginal Provisional Government in Australia, issue passports to their citizens as an assertion of sovereignty symbolically rejecting the legitimacy of settler authorities. Notable examples include the Haudenosaunee passport issued by the Six Nations of the Haudenosaunee confederacy, the Aboriginal passport in Australia, and various indigenous passports in Latin America such as the Kichwa passport in Ecuador. Indigenous passports are typically not recognised as valid travel documents for border control purposes. In particular, the Haudenosaunee Nationals lacrosse team has been involved in high-profile disputes over their refusal to travel on Canadian or American passports to international lacrosse competitions, being prevented from attending the 2010 World Lacrosse Championship in the United Kingdom but being permitted to attend the tournament in 2018 in Israel subject to guarantees from the Canadian and American governments that the players would be permitted to return home.

=== Certificate of Indigenous Status ===
While indigenous passports are generally not recognised by border control authorities, the Certificate of Indigenous Status issued by the Canadian government to individuals on the Indian Register is accepted by American and Canadian border control authorities for travel by land or sea. In 2018, the Canadian government introduced a Secure Certificate of Indigenous Status that serves as a machine readable travel document to enable Indigenous individuals to cross the border more efficiently. In order to address the desire of members of indigenous nations not to be labelled as Canadian citizens, the Secure Certificate of Indigenous Status does not state the individual's nationality. The Canadian government issues Certificates of Indigenous Status to registered indigenous individuals regardless of whether or not they are Canadian citizens or hold Canadian permanent residence but, although America permits Canadian citizens exercising Jay Treaty freedom of movement rights to enter using the document, indigenous individuals holding American citizenship are instead required to use tribal identity cards or other American-issued WHTI-compliant documents.

=== Enhanced Tribal Identity Cards ===
Under the Western Hemisphere Travel Initiative, indigenous people holding American citizenship may clear land and sea border controls using machine readable enhanced tribal identity cards, which contain similar features to enhanced driving licences issued by certain states and provinces. Unlike the Certificate of Indigenous Status, the document is only issued to American citizens. The document is treated by Canadian and American border controls as equivalent to an enhanced driving licence and may additionally be accepted by Mexican border control for entry up to 20–30 km from the border subject to prevailing permit requirements.

=== Kikapoo I-872 Native American Card ===
Mexican citizens enrolled in the Texas Band of Kickapoo Indians or Kickapoo Tribe of Oklahoma may enter United States by land or sea using the Form I-872 American Indian Card, which provides for freedom of movement across the border for the Kickapoo first nation regardless of citizenship. (Note: Since Mexico permits the use of identity cards issued by Mexican consulates overseas and other documents demonstrating Mexican citizenship for its citizens entering the country, Mexican citizens holding membership in the Kickapoo first nation are effectively not required by either country to hold a passport or Border Crossing Card when travelling between the two countries by land or sea)

=== American Samoans ===
While the indigenous peoples of Hawaii, the American mainland, and most American territories have been granted full American citizenship and the accompanying right to apply for a passport on the same basis as any other American, the native population of American Samoa have not. As specified in 8 U.S.C. § 1408, a person whose only connection to the America is through birth in an outlying possession (which is defined in 8 U.S.C. § 1101 as American Samoa and Swains Island, which is administered as part of American Samoa), or through descent from a person so born, acquires American nationality but not citizenship. This was formerly the case in only four other current or former American territories. The origin of this distinction in status is the United States Supreme Court's jurisprudence in the Insular Cases, in which the court held that the indigenous inhabitants of newly acquired territories did not automatically acquire full American citizenship. Consequently, American Samoans are issued passports containing endorsement code 9 which states: "THE BEARER IS A UNITED STATES NATIONAL AND NOT A UNITED STATES CITIZEN." on the annotations page. Non-citizen American nationals may reside and work in the United States without restrictions, but must apply for citizenship under the same rules as resident aliens. Like resident aliens, they are not presently allowed by any American state to vote in federal or state elections, although, as with resident aliens, there is no constitutional prohibition against their doing so.

== Travel documents for animals ==
=== Pet Travel Scheme ===
The Pet Travel Scheme (PETS) is a system which allows animals to travel easily between member countries without undergoing quarantine. A pet passport is a document that officially records information related to a specific animal, as part of that procedure. The effect is to drastically speed up and simplify travel with and transport of animals between member countries, compared to previous procedures if the regulations are followed. On 1 October 2001, the European Union introduced the PETS scheme, under which animals from any member country may freely travel to any other member country on approved carriers. PETS was originally introduced for the benefit of animals entering or returning to the United Kingdom from other European Union countries, since historically the United Kingdom had very strong controls to safeguard against rabies including a compulsory six-month quarantine period on imports of many animals. Over time the scheme has rolled out to other countries such as the United States, Canada, Australia, and New Zealand.

The pet passport itself comes in multiple forms, sometimes a pink A4 sheet, sometimes a small blue booklet. It contains the microchip or the tattoo number of the animal, the certification that it has had a rabies vaccination, and needs to be signed by an officially approved veterinarian. A new style passport with laminated strips and additional security measures was introduced in the United Kingdom in December 2014. Old style passports remain valid. The passport is not to be confused with a much smaller folder (sometimes purple coloured), routinely issued by vets, which records the complete vaccination history of the pet.

Requirements for eligible animals:

- Subcutaneous (below the skin) microchip implant that meets the International Society of Pharmacovigilance (SoP) specification.
- Certified rabies vaccination and results from a blood serology test to confirm the presence of rabies antibodies. For pet travel in Europe, the rabies vaccine should be administered by a veterinarian with a minimum of 21 days before travel. Some countries may differ and always check with your local veterinarian for the procedures to follow.
- Proof of treatment for ticks, fleas and tapeworms
- Veterinarian's letter or certificate confirming fitness to travel and/or no obvious signs of disease
- Government certification that the veterinarian's export documentation and certificates are in order for travel

In some countries, the formal passport is needed. Others will accept documentation in any form so long as it provides clear evidence of the procedure being followed. Usually, the animal and its papers are checked thoroughly upon both departure and arrival.

A pet passport alone can be used to enter some countries if it records all relevant information (e.g., the United Kingdom), but it will not suffice to enter many countries. For instance Guatemala, in common with almost every country operating such a scheme, demands that all imported pets have a rabies vaccination, but will not accept the pet passport as proof of said vaccination. They require the proof of the rabies vaccination in the animal's records.

Tapeworm treatment must be administered by a vet not less than 24 hours and not more than 120 hours (1–5 days) before scheduled arrival time.

Specific country regulations:

- United Kingdom: The rules for bringing pets into the United Kingdom can be quite complex. The official United Kingdom Government website covers this topic in detail. Dogs, cats and ferrets with Pet Passports from EU (& some other) countries can enter the United Kingdom via specified routes and ferry companies, including the Channel Tunnel by car. Before entering the United Kingdom, most pet dogs (including assistance dogs), but not cats or ferrets, must be treated for tapeworm. The treatment must be administered by a vet not less than 24 hours and not more than 120 hours (1–5 days) before its scheduled arrival time in the United Kingdom. (There is no mandatory requirement for tick treatment.) No treatment is required for dogs entering the United Kingdom from Finland, Ireland, Norway or Malta. All animals (except guide dogs) travelling by air to the United Kingdom must travel in the hold as manifest cargo and can only use specific airports and airlines. (Similar rules apply to pets arriving by sea, other than by specific ferry services.) British law precludes all animals entering the United Kingdom by air either in the cabin or in the hold as 'excess' or 'checked' baggage. Most airlines do not offer cargo services to individual passengers directly and specialist agents are normally used. United Kingdom law does not prohibit the transport of dogs and cats in the cabin or as hold baggage when departing from the United Kingdom, but restrictions may be imposed by individual airlines or destination countries.
- Japan: Although a participant in the PETs scheme, to bring pets into Japan from member states there are several separate procedures that must be followed. These do not cover Iceland, Australia, New Zealand, Fiji, Hawaii, and Guam, which have designated region (rabies free) status. To take a pet out of Japan, it may take between 6 months to a year for it to re-enter. Including prior contact with Japanese Quarantine several months before entry. (Note: The dog or cat must be microchipped.; The dog or cat must have stayed in the country for at least 180 days (6 months) since its birth or having left Japan.; The dog or cat must have had 2 rabies injections and a blood test 6 month before entering/re-entering Japan, proving the pet is free of rabies. This test must be carried out at a designated laboratory.; The dog or cat does not have or show signs of rabies or Leptospirosis (dogs only).; To take a dog or cat out of Japan, on top of the necessary injections and microchip, a passenger must: Have certificates issued by an official vet to prove that the dog/cat has been vaccinated, microchipped and wormed as necessary. These are vets designated by the prefecture as able to issue certificates and officially vaccinate.; More than a week before travelling, notify Animal Quarantine Service at the port of departure, and apply for an export inspection for the dog/ cat. The inspection will be carried out by the Quarantine Office (Ken'eki-kyoku) before the pet is checked in.)

The PETS scheme is not yet standardised. This leads to much confusion. Every journey between any two countries should be researched separately to ensure that the animal will be accepted for travel upon arrival at the departure point.

- The major delay in obtaining a pet passport is the time required for the rabies vaccination. The implications are:
  1. An animal may get a valid rabies vaccination and serology check, and then apply for a passport on the spot, at a later date.
  2. An animal whose rabies vaccination is allowed to go out of date (typically 1–2 years) by even one day, without a booster, must start with a new vaccination and delay.
- Because PETS is European wide, the regulations may differ for travel within, and outside, Europe. Pet owners should take care since the requirements for travel to a destination may be quite different from the requirements upon returning.
- A suitable and carrier-approved travel crate may be required, which must have the correct food and water containers as set out by the relevant bodies.
- Animals should not be sedated for air travel since altitude can affect medications. Most airlines will not accept tranquilised animals nowadays. Instead, they are kept in a dark, heated, pressurized hold, which encourages them to sleep for the duration of travel.
- Larger animals may be restricted to airline routes which can accommodate their crates. Not all airlines will carry animals, and charges vary widely – check with each airline before travel.
- Some routes will not fly animals if the temperature is adverse
- Many airlines are unable to provide details of formal procedures. A passenger may need to check with a vet or the consulate of the relevant countries to confirm details.
- Since airline staff are often (at present) poorly trained or uncertain, and conflicting information may be provided, at present it is sensible to double check and document all information supplied.
- In airlines, animals may travel as excess baggage or cargo. "Excess baggage" (in effect treating the crate and animal as another suitcase) ensures they travel on the same flight and is often much cheaper.
- The United Kingdom restricts incoming flights to ship animals as cargo. A cheaper alternative around this aberration in the rules is to fly to some other European city, such as Paris or Amsterdam, and then travel to the United Kingdom by rail or ferry instead, which do not have this restriction. Passengers travelling with animals by rail or ferry to or from the United Kingdom must in many cases need to have access to a vehicle, as the passenger cannot currently take animals directly on foot by Eurostar, and neither on most ferry routes. After arriving in Europe from a non-EU participating country, the certificate received from customs/quarantine is valid for Europe wide travel for up to 4 months, though it is best to contact DEFRA directly prior to travel.

=== Horse passports ===
A horse passport is documentation that allows horses to be accurately identified and more easily be transported internationally. In the United States, they are primarily intended for animals competing in International Federation for Equestrian Sports (FEI) events. In the United Kingdom, it is now required for all equines to have a "passport" and an animal cannot be sold without one.

The United Kingdom law, passed in 2003, allows owners to keep a horse from entering the food chain for slaughter by signing a declaration which allows the horse to be treated with medications that are inexpensive but not appropriate for animals that will be used as food. It also means the owners will have to find a means other than slaughter to dispose of an unwanted horse. All equines, including horses, ponies, donkeys and other equids, must have a passport and owners can be fined up to £5,000 if the animal does not.

In the United States, the United States Equestrian Federation (USEF) issues passports for FEI competition. To obtain a passport, the horse must be life-registered with the USEF, be owned by a U.S. Citizen, who must be a member of the USEF. The passport must be renewed every four years and updated if the animal changes ownership.

== Internal travel documents ==
In countries which maintain internal border controls, travel documents are required for travellers crossing internal borders.

Internal travel documents are commonly issued in minority and border regions of India and China. In India, special permits are required to travel across much of the country's north-east and requirements may vary within a given state. Special provisions are occasionally made for individuals from Bhutan or Nepal proceeding to or from their home country. Additionally, individuals arriving in the Andaman and Nicobar Islands from elsewhere in India receive passport stamps (see gallery at end of section), even though only foreigners are typically subject to permit requirements. Permits issued for minority regions in India include:

- Restricted Area Permits and Protected Area Permits for foreigners in portions of north-eastern India and the Andaman and Nicobar Islands
- Inner Line Permits for Indian citizens

Similarly, in the Tibet Autonomous Region (Tibetan: བོད་རང་སྐྱོང་ལྗོངས།; Chinese: 西藏自治区), two categories of permits are issued:

- The Tibet Travel Permits (Chinese: 外国人入藏函 foreigners' entrance letter) required for all foreigners (as well as Chinese citizens from the Republic of China) to enter the region
- The Alien Travel Permit required for holders of the Tibet Travel Permit to travel outside major urban and tourist areas of the region
- The Military Permit (or Border Permit) is required for travel to Ngari (Tibetan: མངའ་རིས་ས་ཁུལ་; Chinese: 阿里), Nyingchi (Tibetan: ཉིང་ཁྲི་ས།; Chinese: 林芝), and Nagqu (Tibetan: ནག་ཆུ།; Chinese: 那曲)
- Additionally, special permits are issued to nationals of India and Bhutan for religious pilgrimages to Hindu and Buddhist holy sites in the Tibet Autonomous Region.

Internal air and rail travel within non-autonomous portions of India and mainland China also generally require travel documents to be checked by government officials as a form of interior border checkpoint. For such travel within India, Indian citizens may utilise their Voter ID, National Identity Card, passport, or other proof of Indian citizenship whilst Nepali nationals may present any similar proof of Napali citizenship. Meanwhile, for such travel within mainland China, Chinese nationals from the mainland are required to use their national identity cards.

Within China, extensive border controls are also maintained for those travelling between the mainland, special administrative regions of Hong Kong and Macau, and areas controlled by the Republic of China. Foreign nationals need to present their passports or other required types of travel documents when travelling between these areas. For Chinese nationals (including those with British National (Overseas) status), there are special documents (Note: For example, Hong Kong Permanent Identity Card or Macau Identity Card and Home Return Permit (simplified Chinese: 回乡证; traditional Chinese: 回鄉證; pinyin: Huíxiāngzhèng) are required for Hong Kong or Macau Permanent Residents who are Chinese citizens to cross the border, whilst mainlanders require a Two-Way Permit (Chinese: 双程证).) for travel between these territories. Similar arrangements exist for travel between territories controlled by the Republic of China and territories controlled by the People's Republic of China. (Note: Documents required for travel between the PRC and ROC are: The Mainland Travel Permit for Taiwan Residents (simplified Chinese: 台胞证; traditional Chinese: 臺胞證; pinyin: Táibāozhèng) issued by the PRC for entry to the mainland, which is also valid but not mandatory for entry to Hong Kong and Macau; The Taiwan Entry Permit (Chinese: 入臺證; pinyin: Rùtáizhèngg) issued to mainlanders by the ROC; The Kinmen-Matsu Permit (traditional Chinese: 金馬證; simplified Chinese: 金马证; pinyin: JīnMǎ zhèng; Pe̍h-ōe-jī: Kim-Má-chèng) issued to residents of Kinmen and Matsu (ROC-administered territories in Fujian as well as Penghu for travel to and from the mainland.) Internal border controls in China have also resulted in the creation of special permits allowing Chinese citizens to immigrate to or reside in other immigration areas within the country. The following documents are currently issued for this purpose:

- For mainlanders emigrating to either of the two Special Administrative Regions, authorities in the mainland issue the One Way Travel Permit (Chinese: 单程证; pinyin: Dānchéngzhèng). As the policy is designed to curtail emigration from the mainland rather than immigration to either SAR, issuance is exclusively the responsibility of authorities in the mainland.
- Since September 2018, authorities in the mainland have issued the Residence Permit for Hong Kong, Macao, and Taiwan Residents (Chinese: 港澳台居民居住证; pinyin: Gǎng-Aò-Tái Jūmín Jūzhùzhèng) authorising Chinese citizens from Hong Kong, Macau, and areas administered by the Republic of China to reside in the mainland. The permit is designed to resemble the national identity card issued to individuals with household registration in the mainland and enables holders to access public and private sector services that require a national identity card number.

In Malaysia, where an arrangement was agreed upon during the formation of the country, the East Malaysian states of Sabah and Sarawak were allowed to retain their respective immigration control systems. Therefore, a passport is required for foreign visitors when travelling from Peninsular Malaysia to East Malaysia, as well as moving between Sabah and Sarawak. For social/business visits not more than 3 months, Peninsular Malaysians are required to produce a MyKad or, for children below 12 years a birth certificate, and obtain a special immigration printout form to be kept until departure. However, one may present a Malaysian passport or a Restricted Travel Document and get an entry stamp on the travel document to avoid the hassle of keeping an extra sheet of paper. For other purposes, Peninsular Malaysians are required to have a long-term residence permit along with a passport or a Restricted Travel Document.

Prior to 2016, Norfolk Island, one of Australia's external, self-governing territories, maintained its own immigration controls. Until 2018, Australian and New Zealand citizens travelling to the territory were required to carry a passport, or an Australian Document of Identity, while people of other nationalities must also have a valid Australian visa and/or Permanent Resident of Norfolk Island visa.

Additionally, some states issue internal passport as an identity document. An example is the internal passport of Russia or certain other post-Soviet countries dating back to imperial times. Some countries use internal passports for controlling migration within a country. In some countries, the international passport or passport for travel abroad is a second passport, in addition to the internal passport, required for a citizen to travel abroad within the country of residence. Separate passports for travel abroad existed or exist in the following countries:

- Russia: see Internal passport of Russia
- Ukraine: see Ukrainian identity card#Previous internal passport (1992-2016)
- In the Soviet Union, there were several types of international passport: an ordinary one, a civil service passport, a diplomatic passport, and a sailor's passport. See Passport system in the Soviet Union.
- Countries of the Eastern Bloc had a system of internal/international passports similar to that of the Soviet Union.
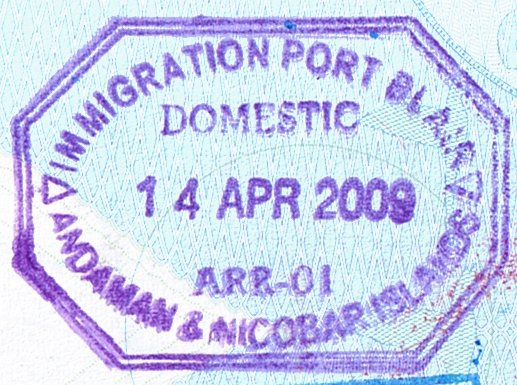
Domestic Immigration stamp permitting entry into the Andaman and Nicobar Islands in India

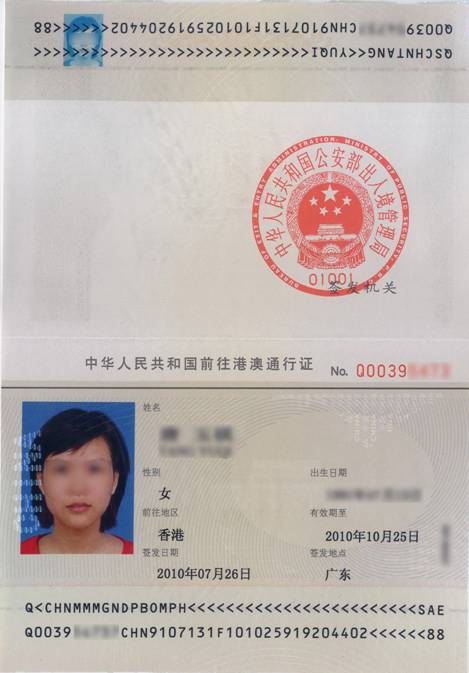
Sample of a One Way Travel Permit for internal emigration from mainland China to Hong Kong or Macau

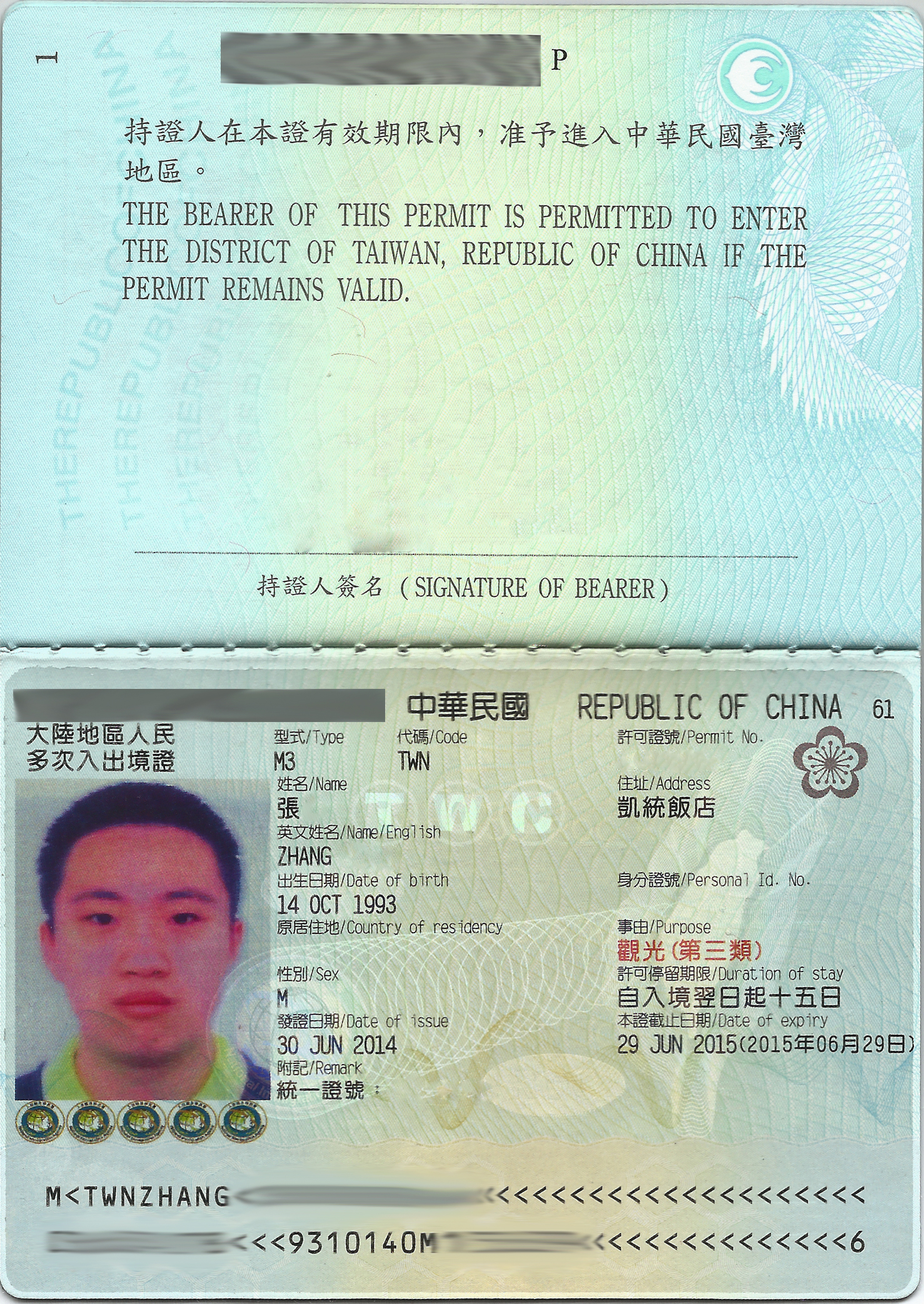
Data page of a booklet type internal travel document issued by Taiwan authorities to a mainland Chinese resident

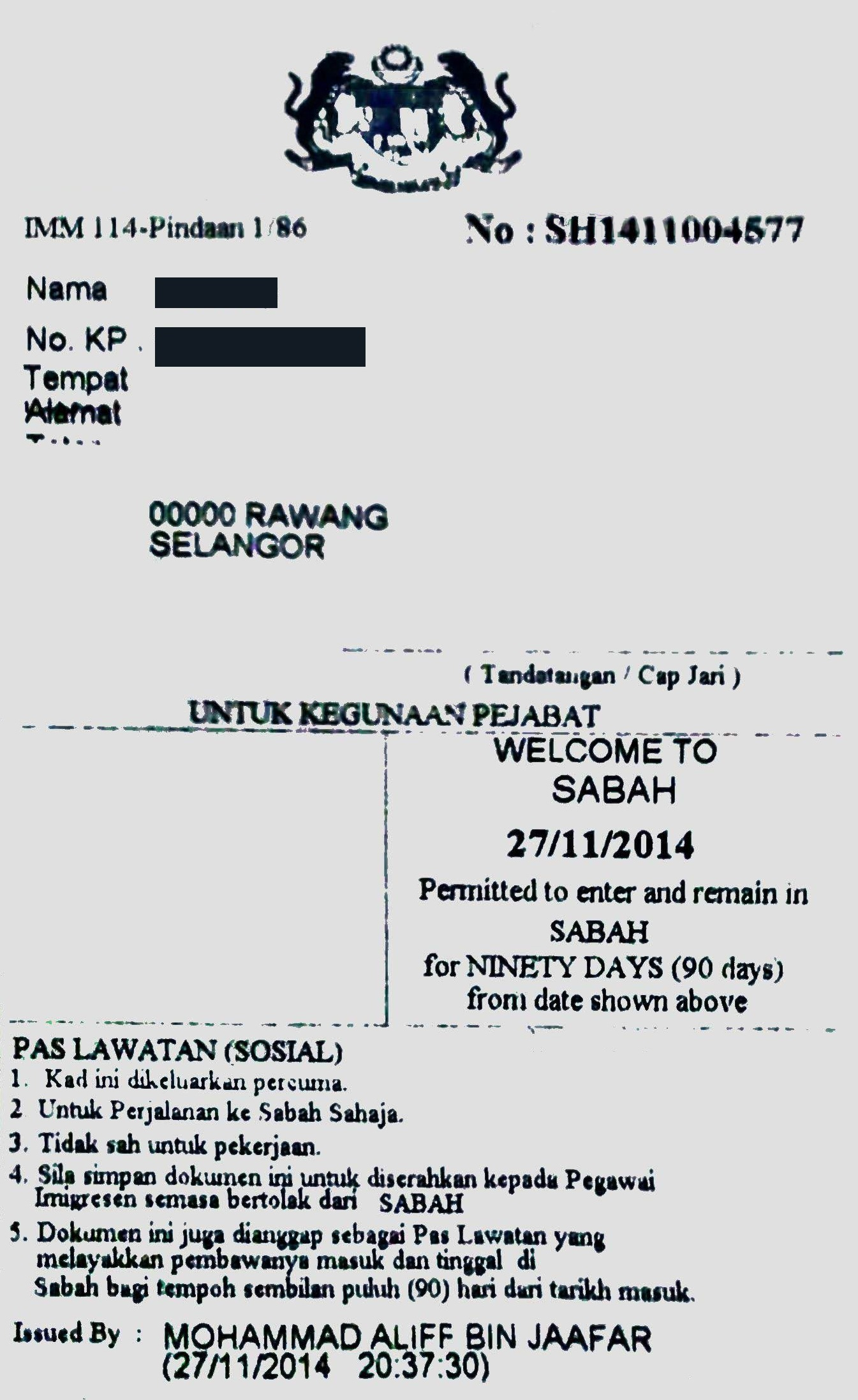
Document In Lieu of Internal Travel Document (IMM.114) given to West Malaysian citizens entering the state of Sabah using Malaysian identity card for social and business visits. The form must be returned to the immigration officer upon departure from Sabah.

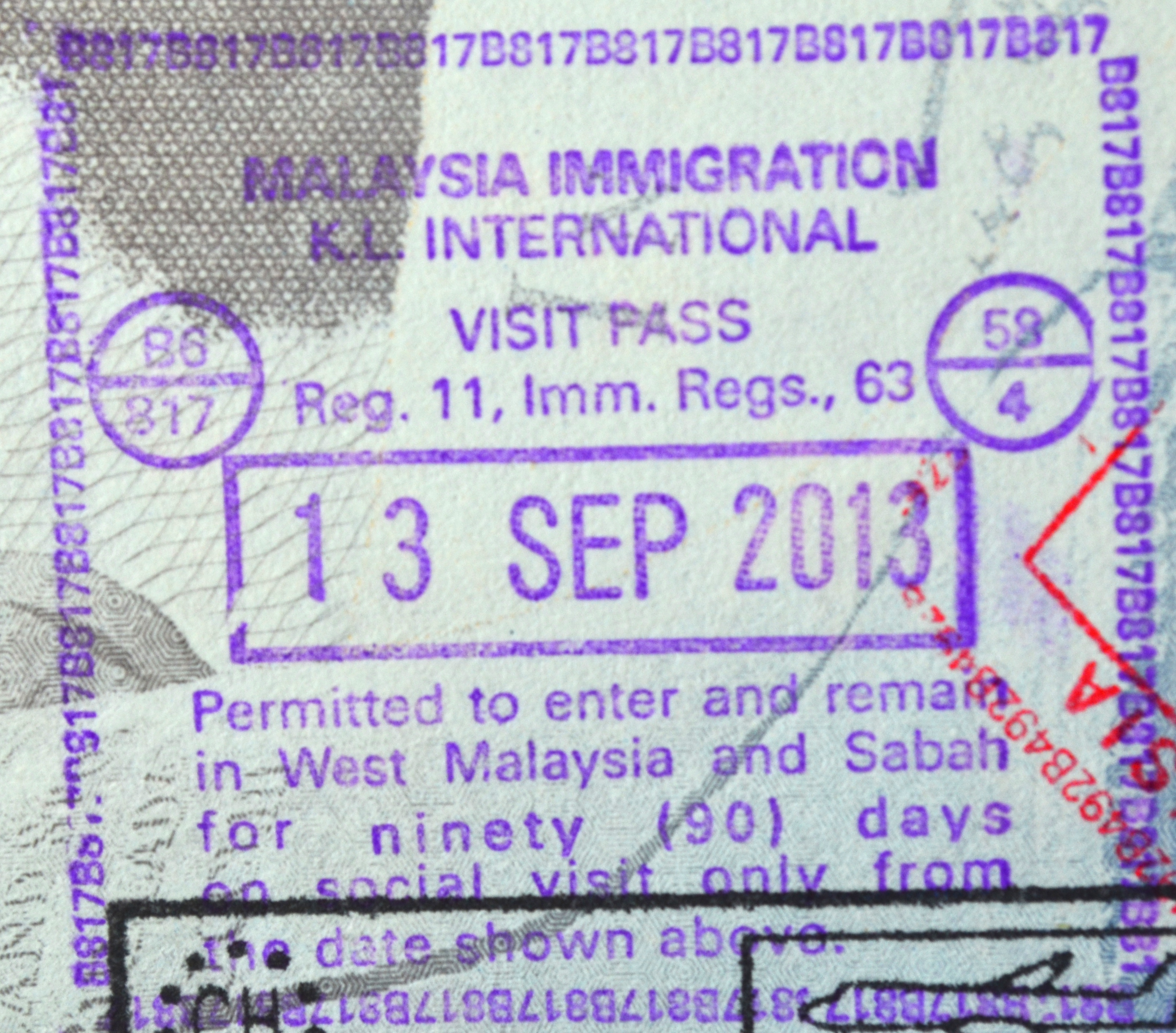
Malaysian entry stamps specify which jurisdictions (i.e. West or Peninsular Malaysia, Sabah, and Sarawak) the bearer is permitted to enter, and there are immigration checks when entering each.

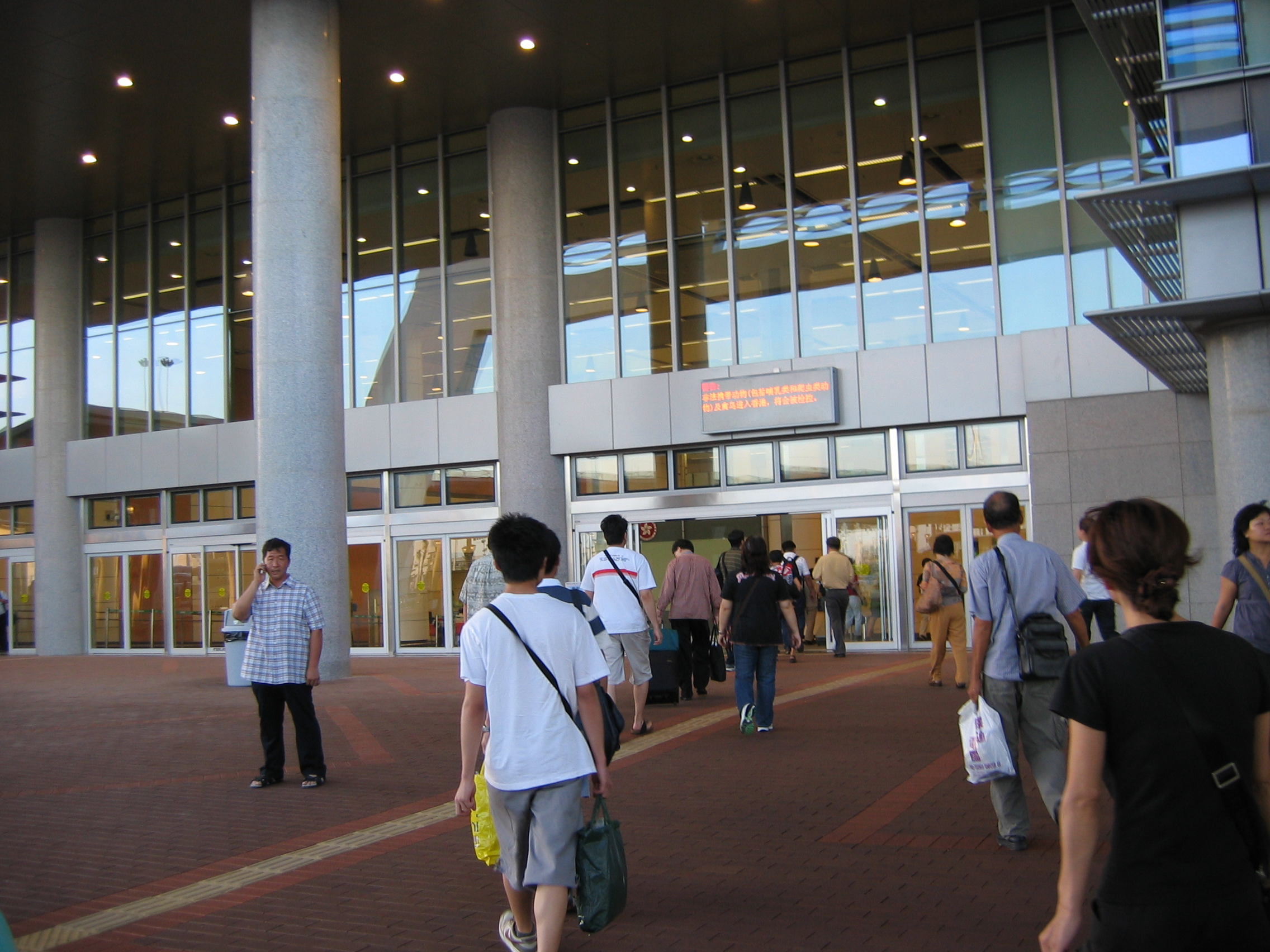
The entrance to the building of the Shenzhen Bay Control Point, an internal border checkpoint between Hong Kong and mainland China

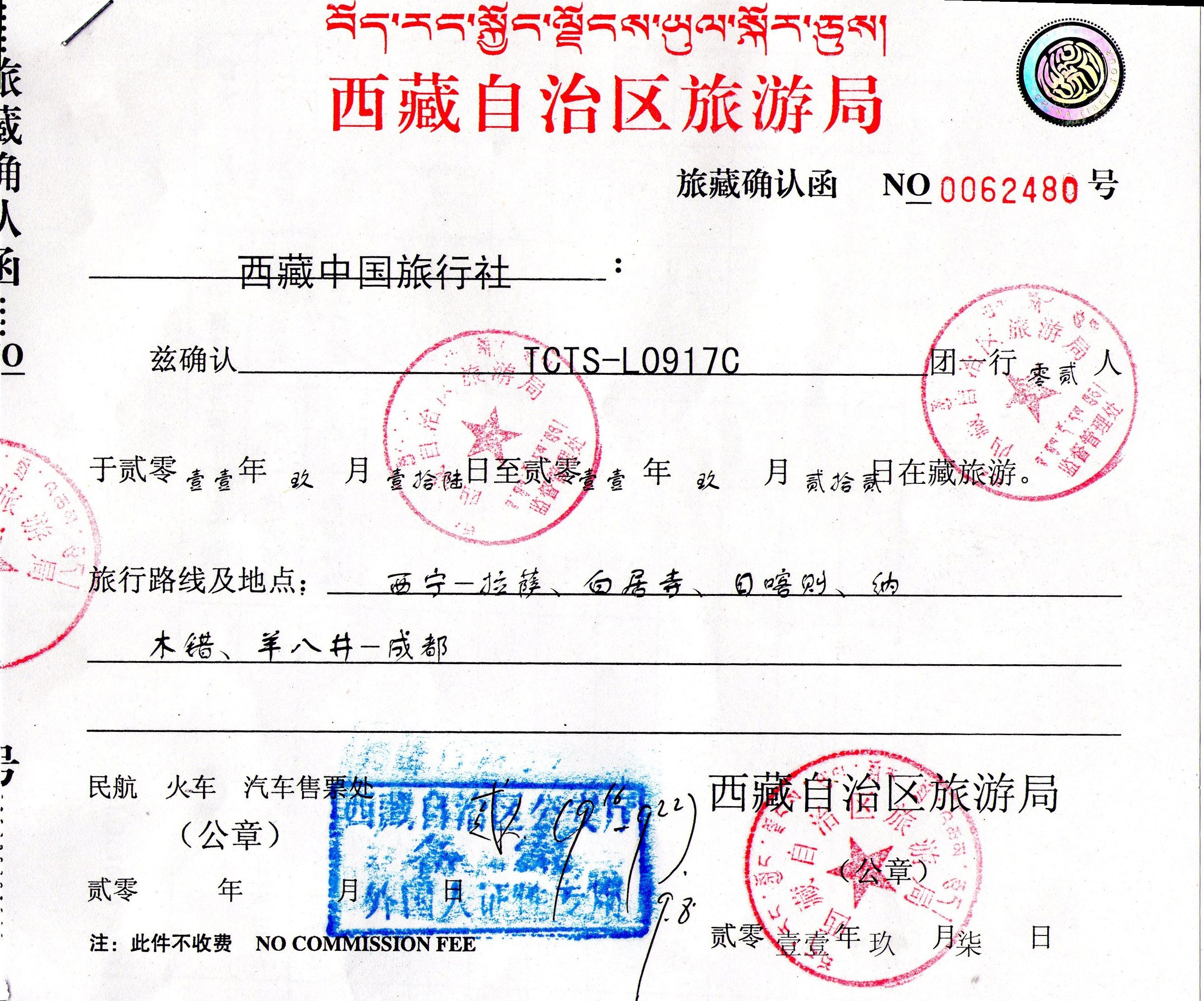
The Tibet Travel Permit, required to enter the Tibet Autonomous Region, is an example of internal border controls in minority regions of China and India. Other similar documents include Restricted Area Permits and Protected Area permits primarily issued to enter India's northeast.

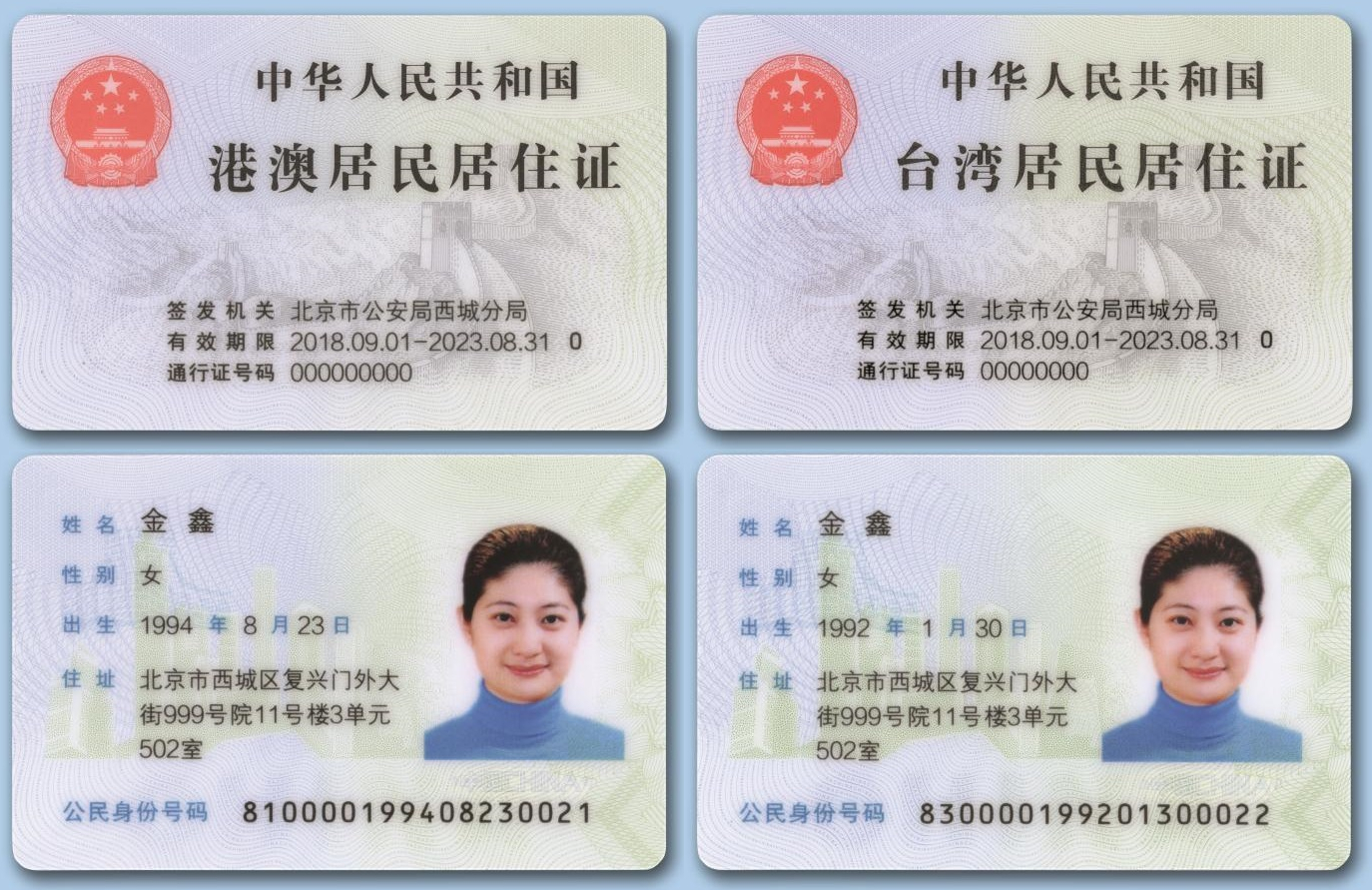
Front and back of mainland residence permits for Chinese citizens from Hong Kong and Macau (left) and Chinese citizens from areas administered by the Republic of China (right)

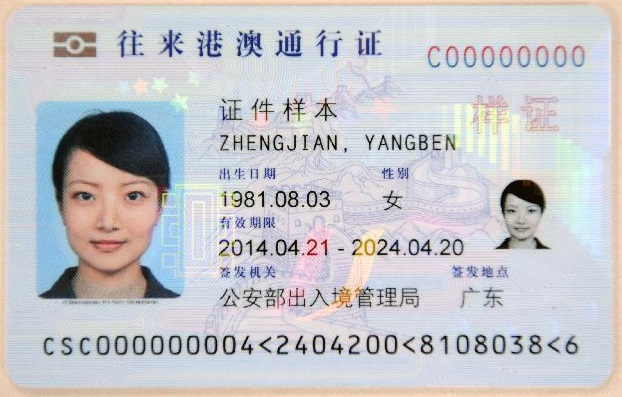
Internal travel document issued to Chinese citizens from the mainland for travel to and from Hong Kong and Macau

== International travel without travel documents ==
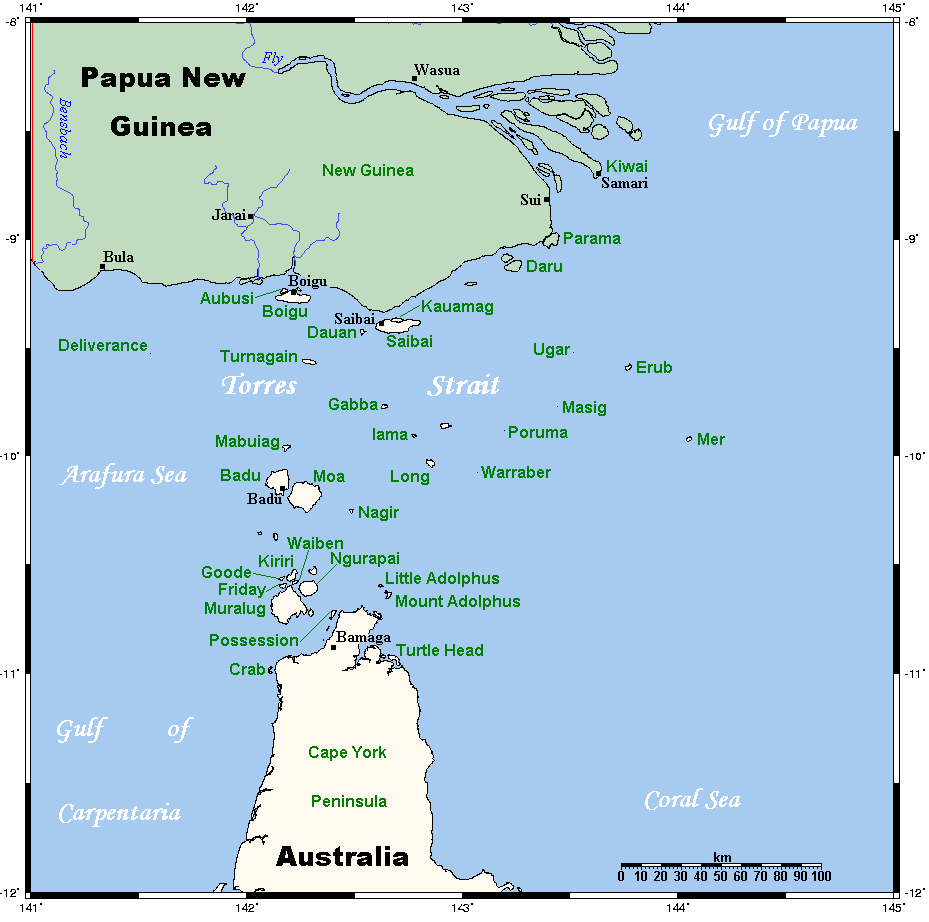
The Torres Strait separating Australia and Papua New Guinea

International travel is possible without travel documents in some circumstances. Nonetheless, a document stating citizenship, such as a national identity card or an Enhanced Driving Licence, is usually required.

The Kartarpur Corridor allows devotees from India to visit the gurdwara in Kartarpur, 4.7 kilometres (2.9 miles) from the India–Pakistan border on the Pakistani side without a passport or a visa. Residents of nine coastal villages in Papua New Guinea are permitted to enter the 'Protected Zone' of the Torres Strait (part of Queensland, Australia) for traditional purposes. This exemption from passport control is part of a treaty between Australia and Papua New Guinea negotiated when PNG became independent from Australia in 1975. Vessels from other parts of Papua New Guinea and other countries attempting to cross into Australia or Australian waters are stopped by Australian Border Force or the Royal Australian Navy.

Travel documents are not needed by citizens of India and Nepal to travel to each other's country, but some identification is required for border crossings and citizens from either country are not necessarily required to be inspected at checkpoints, though foreign nationals are required to comply with each country's visa policy. Similarly, Travel with minimal travel documents is possible between the United Kingdom, the Isle of Man, Guernsey, Jersey, and Ireland, which together form the Common Travel Area.

The countries that are part of the Schengen Area, do not implement passport controls between each other, unless exceptional circumstances occur. It is, however, mandatory to carry a passport, compliant national identity card, alien's resident permit or some other photo ID.

The Nordic Passport Union allows Nordic citizens, i.e. citizens of Denmark (including the Faroe Islands), Finland, Iceland, Norway and Sweden to visit any of these countries without being in possession of identity documents (Greenland and Svalbard are excluded). This is an extension of the principle that Nordic citizens need no identity document in their own country. A means to prove identity when requested is recommended (e.g. using a driver's licence, which does not state citizenship), even in one's own country. Joining the Schengen Area in 2001 has not changed those rules.

For travel to the French islands of Saint Pierre and Miquelon directly from Canada, Canadians and foreign nationals holding Canadian identification documents are exempted from travel document and visa requirements for stays of maximum duration of 3 months within a period of 6 months.

=== De facto travel documents ===
De facto travel documents are documents which in practice will be sufficient to cross borders legally, but with no legal status as a travel document. These are necessary in practice in areas in which travel documents are not expressly required for nationals of part Within the Border Controls in the Common Travel Area, travel between Ireland, the United Kingdom, the British Crown Dependencies, Isle of Man and Channel Islands, no travel documents are required by British or Irish citizens. As this requirement does not hold for others, these citizens have to establish the presumption of having this nationality, which requires in practice some form of identification. The documents used for this purpose (most notably: driving licence) are thus de facto travel documents. Some airlines still require passport from CTA citizens.

The Nordic Passport Union means that Nordic citizens (of Norway, Denmark, Sweden, Finland and Iceland) can stay in all those countries (on the paper) without any I.D., in the same way as in the home country. In reality an I.D. card is needed for travel and other situations, and any Nordic I.D. card is valid in the area for travel purposes (but not for residence, e.g. banking or authority contacts).

== Other means of identification ==
Strictly speaking, it is not necessary for an EU, EEA or Swiss citizen to possess a valid travel document (such as a national identity card or passport) to enjoy the right of free movement in the EU, EEA and Switzerland. In theory, if an EU, EEA or Swiss citizen can prove their nationality by 'any other means' (e.g., by presenting an expired national identity card or passport, or a citizenship certificate), they must be permitted to enter and reside in the EU, EEA and Switzerland without a visa. An EU citizen who is unable to demonstrate their nationality satisfactorily must nonetheless be given 'every reasonable opportunity' to obtain the necessary documents or to have them delivered within a reasonable period of time.

== See also ==
- Passport
- Stateless person's travel document
- Refugee travel document

== Bibliography ==
- Statutory Instrument 2004 No. 2364: The Rabies (Importation of Dogs, Cats and Other Mammals) (England) (Amendment) Order 2004. Office of Public Sector Information. 2004-09-17. ISBN 978-0-11-049813-3.
