= Singapore Certificate of Identity =

Travel document

Singaporean Certificate of Identity
- Type: Travel document
- Issued by: Singapore
- Purpose: International travel document
- Eligibility: Singaporean permanent residents who are stateless
- Expiration: 5 years

The Singaporean Certificate of Identity (COI) is an international travel document issued by the Immigration and Checkpoints Authority to Singapore Permanent Residents (SPR) who are stateless and holding a Singapore blue identity card. The Singapore Certificate of Identity is to help facilitate SPRs to travel abroad. The holder will require a visa whenever they wish to visit or pass through other countries.

== Application ==
SPRs that want to obtain a COI have to complete two forms, that are available from the embassy or can be downloaded from the internet, and appear in person with two recent passport-sized colour photographs of the applicant against a white background with a matt or semi-matt finish, the following documents (original and photocopy) of the applicant's blue identity card and their latest COI (if any) should also be submitted. The fee is S$125 for 5 years. The estimated processing time is usually 4-6 weeks. To collect your COI the embassy will inform you of the result once they receive an update from the ICA. All successful applicants must appear in person in Singapore at Permanent Resident Services Centres or ICA Buildings to collect their COI.

== Use ==
A holder of a Certificate of Identity can enter Germany and Hungary visa-free for a maximum of 90 days within a 180-day period. In the case of Germany, for holders of a COI to enter visa-free, their travel document must be endorsed and issued under the terms of the Convention relating to the Status of Stateless Persons of 28 September 1954. However, as Singapore is not a signatory to the 1954 Stateless Persons Convention, in practice the visa exemption to Germany does not apply to any holder of the COI. However, COI holders can nonetheless qualify for a visa exemption to Hungary since the Hungarian government does not require their travel document to be issued under the terms of the 1954 Stateless Persons Convention.
