= Freedom Center =

Freedom Center may refer to:

- Freedom Center (Chicago), an American newspaper production facility
- Freedom Center (Omaha), an American newspaper production facility
- Freedom Center (TSA), operation center of the United States Transportation Security Administration
- National Underground Railroad Freedom Center, a museum in Cincinnati, Ohio, USA
- International Freedom Center, a proposed museum in New York City, USA
- David Horowitz Freedom Center, an American political organisation

== See also ==
- Freedom House
- Freedom Tower (disambiguation)
