= Safe Skies =

Travel lock manufacturer

- Type: Travel locks
- Industry: Travel security
- Founded: 2004; 22 years ago
- Services: TSA-approved locks
- Website: safeskieslocks.com

Safe Skies is a luggage lock manufacturer. It was founded in 2004 by David Tropp. It's one of the two lock manufacturers approved by the Transportation Security Administration (TSA); the other is Travel Sentry. It has agreements with airport regulators for at least eight nations. Safe Skies locks allow airport security personnel to use a master key to open travelers' luggage during airport security checks without having to cut or force it open.

In 2024, the company joined hands with U.S. Customs and Border Protection to provide master tools for Safe Skies locks used during border security checks.

== Patent infringement case ==
In 2007, founder David Tropp sued Travel Sentry for patent infringement. Travel Sentry filed a court appeal to squash Safe Skies' inventor's rights. The court dismissed it, but Travel Sentry refiled it in another city. In 2019, the United States Court of Appeals ruled in Safe Skies' favor.

== Master key compromise ==
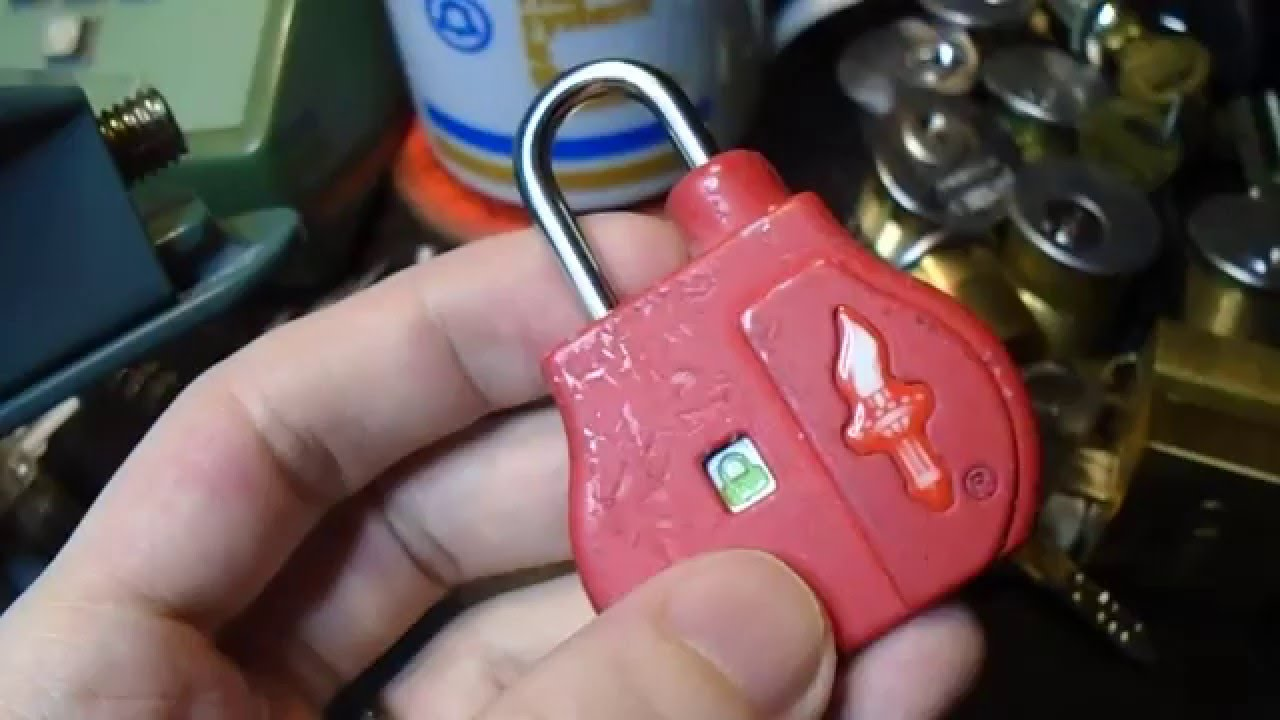
A Safe Skies padlock

In 2016, a group of hackers involved in 3D printing used master keys for Safe Skies locks to unlock them. The same group was involved in carrying out a similar activity for Travel Sentry.
