= Jason Harrington =

American writer and former Transportation Security Administration employee

Jason Edward Harrington is an American writer, blogger, and former Transportation Security Administration (TSA) employee who has been highly critical of the agency since he left it in 2013. As of December 2015, he was studying for a MFA at the University of Mississippi.

== Early years ==
Harrington was born in Roselle, Illinois, to a German-American mother and African-American father.

== Career ==
Harrington began working for the TSA in 2007, as a screener at O’Hare International Airport in Chicago, to help pay his way through school. During this time he became a frequent online contributor of humor and creative nonfiction to the San Francisco-based publishing company McSweeney's, as well as the humor website Cracked.com. In early 2012, while still working for the TSA, he started the blog "Taking Sense Away" on WordPress, with the aim of "tell[ing] the public the truth about what was going on at the agency." Originally, he ran the blog anonymously, and attempted to preserve his anonymity by only using public computers, but later switched to masking his home IP address using Tor. In January 2013, the Los Angeles Times published an article quoting a TSA spokesperson responding to the claims made in one of Harrington's blog posts by saying that the claims made therein, including that TSA employees were laughing at pictures of people going through body scanners, were false. Several days later, the TSA canceled its contract with Rapiscan, the manufacturers of the full-body scanners. In May 2013, he quit working for the TSA. The following January, he wrote a 4-page article for Politico about his experiences working for the TSA, an article which was subsequently covered by other media outlets. In a response to the article, the TSA claimed that in it, Harrington lied and/or described long-abandoned practices.
