= Luggage lock =

Type of lock designed for luggage

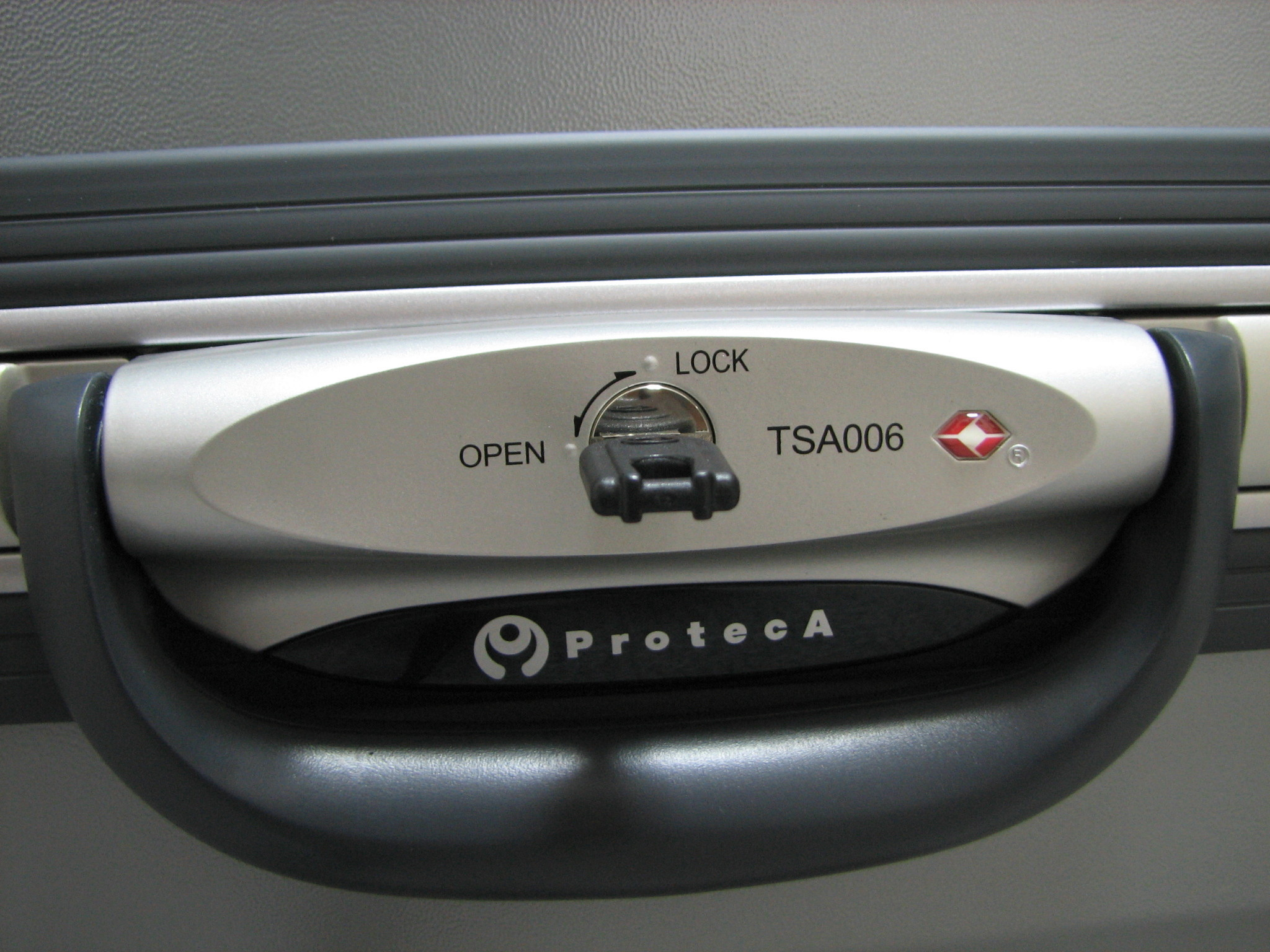
Built-in TSA luggage lock using Travel Sentry standard

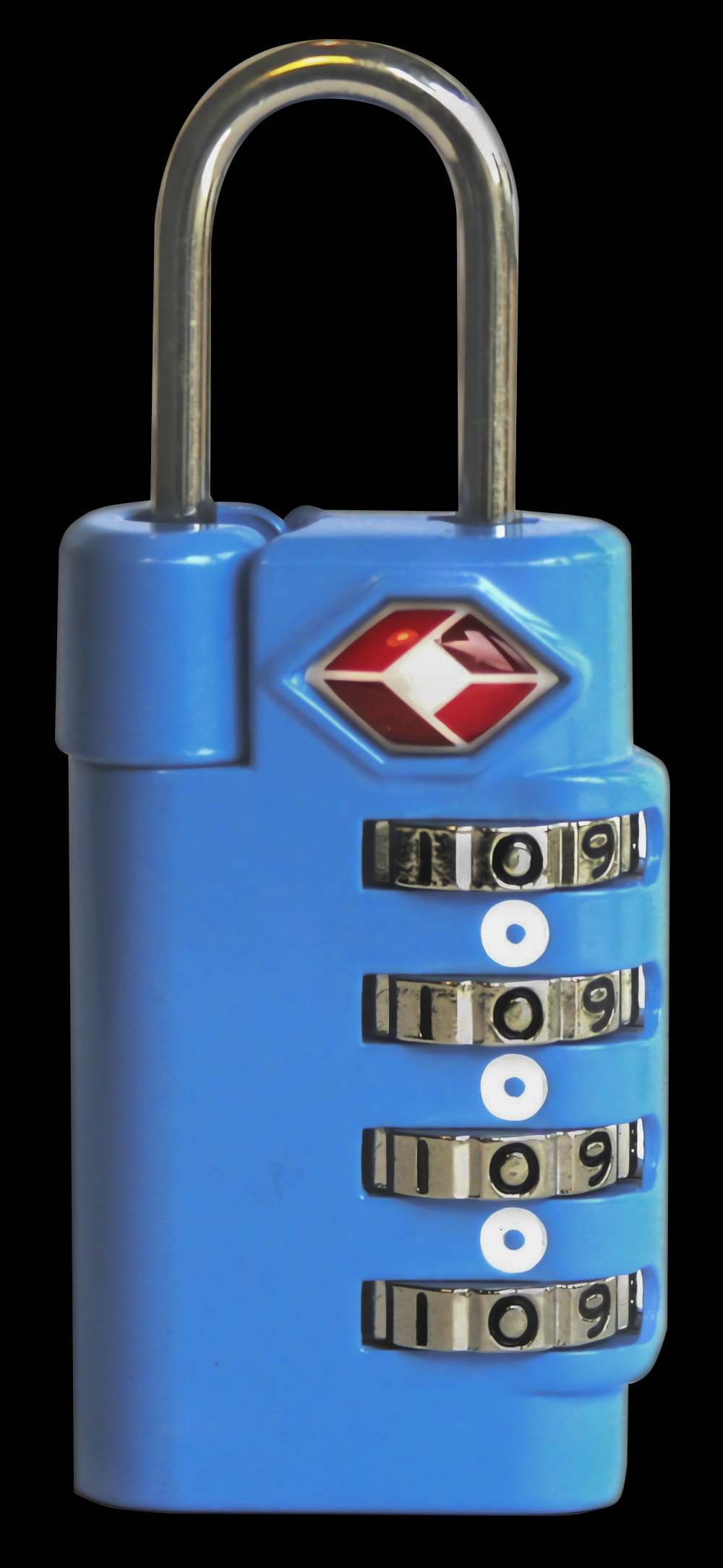
Combination padlock using Travel Sentry TSA Lock system

A luggage lock is a lock used to prevent luggage from opening by accident, usually with little or no security in mind, although the lock may serve as a deterrent to potential thieves. Luggage locks may be built into luggage or may be external locks such as padlocks or lockable straps.

== Security ==
Luggage locks are typically low-security locks. The shackles have a small diameter and are easy to clip using bolt cutters or similar equipment. Luggage locks based on a pin tumbler lock design usually use only three or four pins, making them susceptible to lockpicking, even with tools as simple as a bent paperclip.

== TSA Accepted ==
In the United States the Transportation Security Administration (TSA) requires access to luggage without the passenger being present; to allow travelers to lock their luggage they have accepted certain locks which they can open and relock. The TSA recommend that TSA-accepted locks be used, as luggage locked using other methods must be opened by force in order to be inspected.

Luggage locks accepted by the TSA can be opened by the authorities using publicly known universal "master" keys. Locks using this system are produced to meet standards set by Travel Sentry. Under agreement with the TSA, it is Travel Sentry that sets the standards for these locks and approves each design. Every lock with the Travel Sentry identifying mark (red diamond) is accepted by the TSA.

Some TSA-accepted locks feature an indicator which will appear red if opened by a master key, so the owner will know that their bag has been accessed.

Images of the master keys were left unsecured on the Travel Sentry web site allowing the seven master keys to be easily reproduced.
