= Freedom Tower (disambiguation) =

Freedom Tower was an early proposed name for One World Trade Center, a skyscraper in New York City.

Freedom Tower may also refer to:

- Freedom Tower (Miami)
- Azadi Tower or Freedom Tower, a building in Tehran, Iran
- Freedom Tower on Hickam Air Force Base, Hawaii

== See also ==
- Freedom Center (disambiguation)
