= Travel Sentry =

Travel lock standard developing company

- Company's red diamond logo
- Founded: 2003
- Founder: John Vermilye
- Headquarters: Nyon, Switzerland
- Website: travelsentry.org

Travel Sentry is a company that develops and licenses standards used in travel security, including a standard for luggage locks that can be opened by aviation security agencies such as the Transportation Security Administration (TSA).

== History ==
Travel Sentry was founded in 2003. The first locks manufactured to the Travel Sentry Approved standards went on sale on November 12, 2003. Initially, only key and combination padlocks were manufactured using this standard. In 2004, the first luggage with integrated Travel Sentry locks were introduced.

As of 2019 there are over 500 million Travel Sentry locks and luggage in circulation.

== Luggage locks ==
Travel Sentry developed a lock system that is "accepted and recognized" by the TSA, Canadian Air Transport Security Authority (CATSA) and other security agencies, and allows them, using special tools and codes, to open and re-lock locks. The tools provided by Travel Sentry are at every luggage screening checkpoint at all 750 airports controlled by the TSA.

Travel Sentry says the system is used at all airports in the United States and Canada, and at some major airports in Austria, Belgium, China, Czech Republic, Denmark, Finland, Germany, Israel, Japan, Netherlands, South Korea, Switzerland, and Togo.

The system is licensed to over 500 companies worldwide, primarily luggage brands, lock manufacturers and distributors of travel goods. Some of these locks have an optical indicator, that shows, if the lock was opened using a master key. The indicator can only be reset with the user key (or combination).

The company's red diamond logo is universally recognised for being baggage safety check-friendly.

== Gallery ==
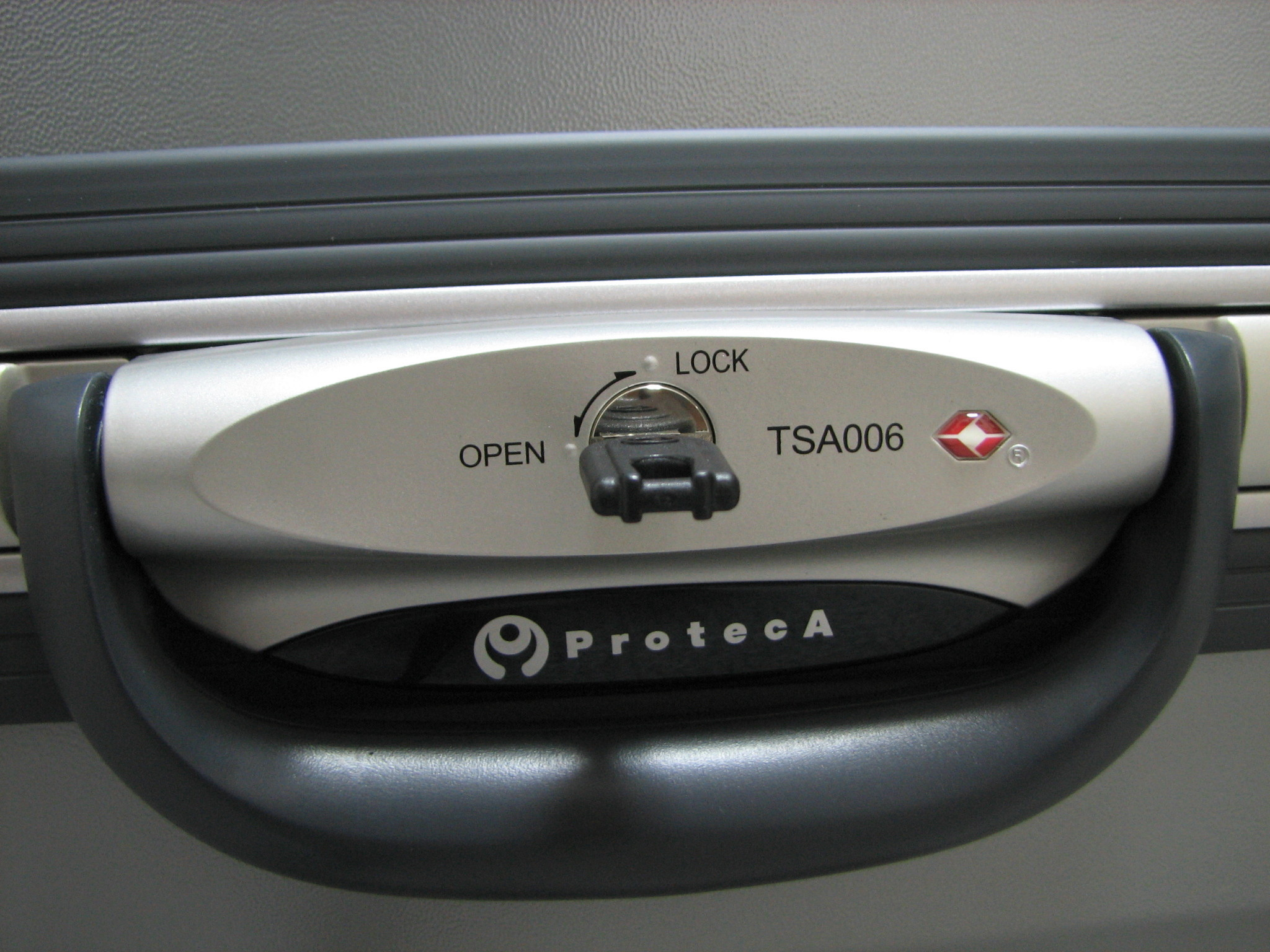
Luggage with TSA Lock

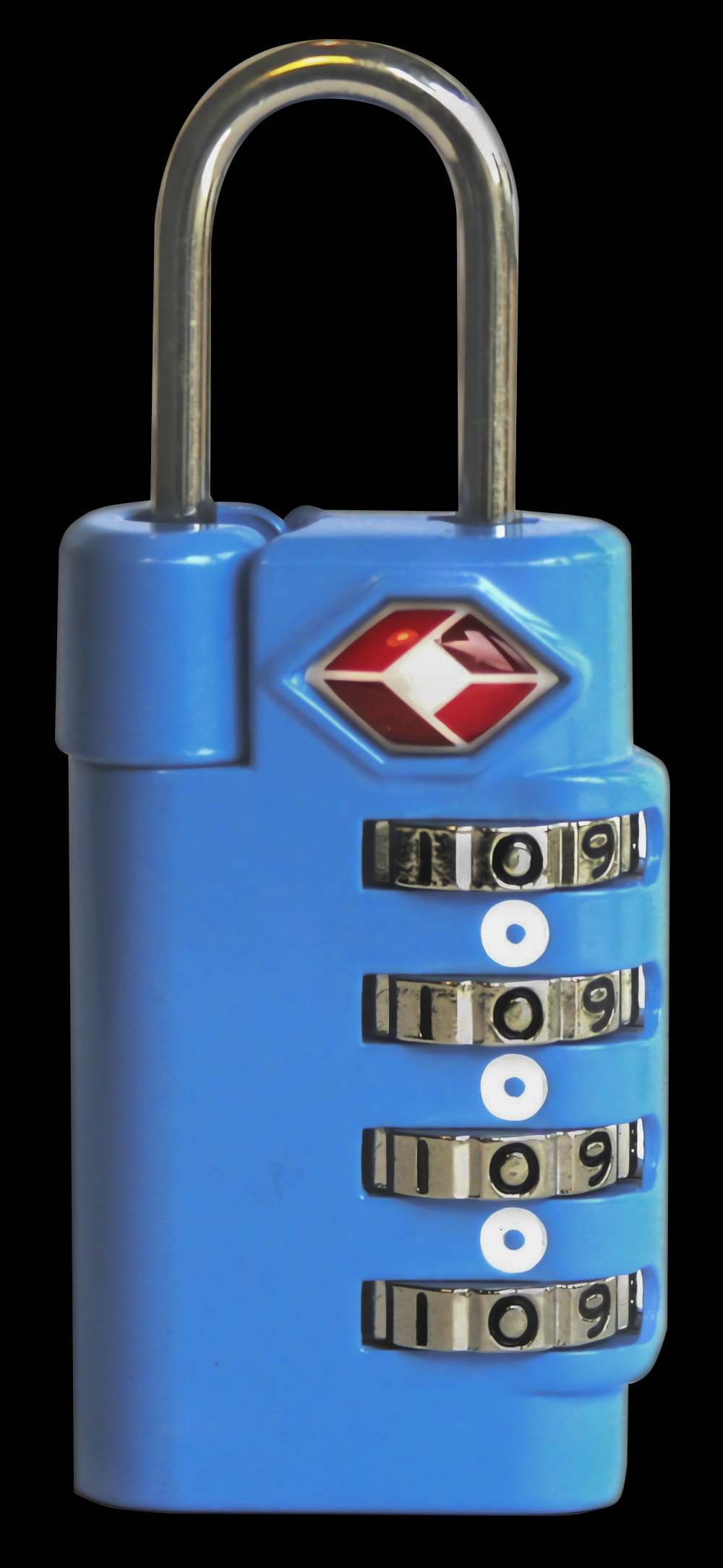
TSA Lock-combination padlock

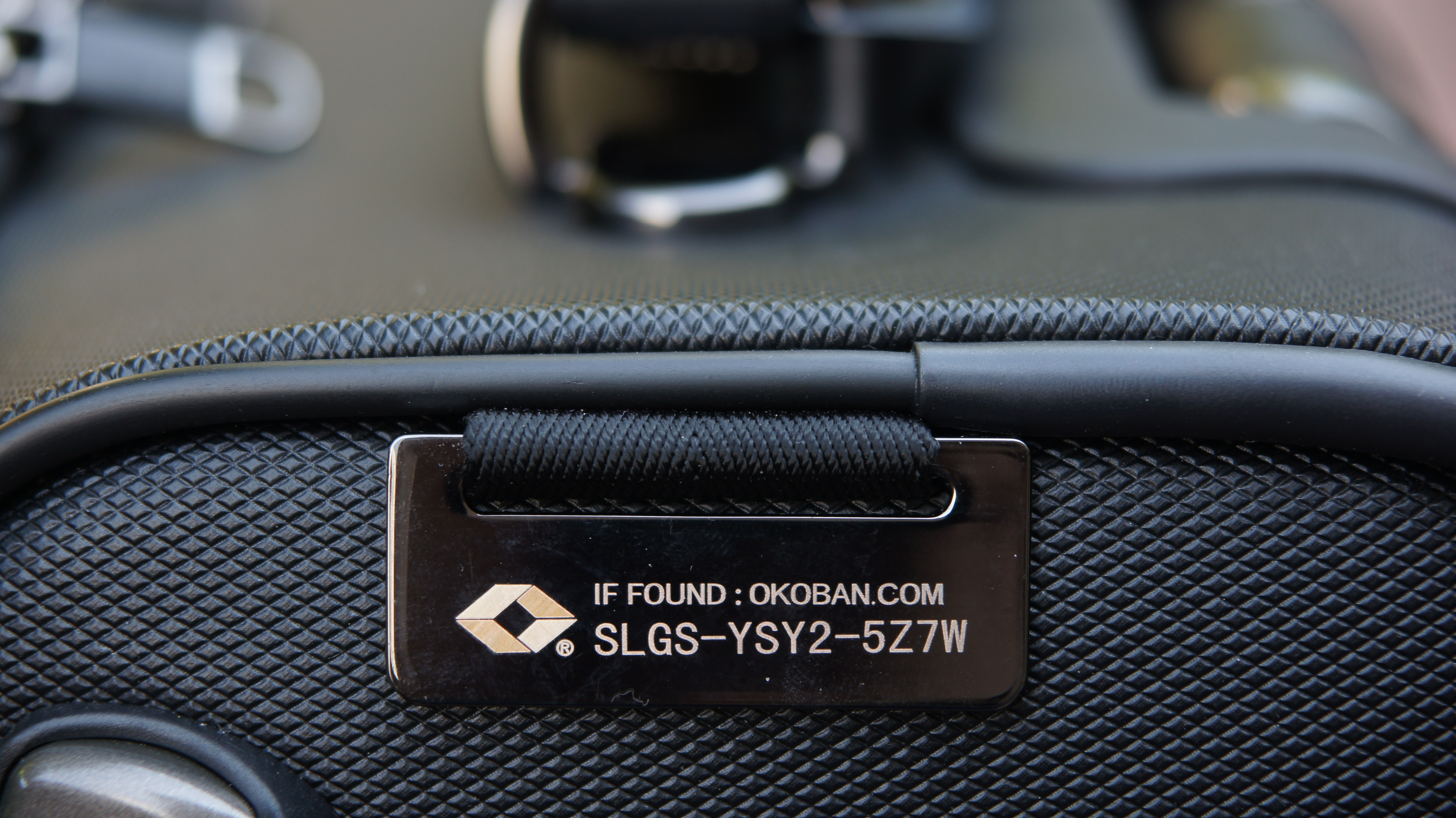
Okoban UID engraved on luggage

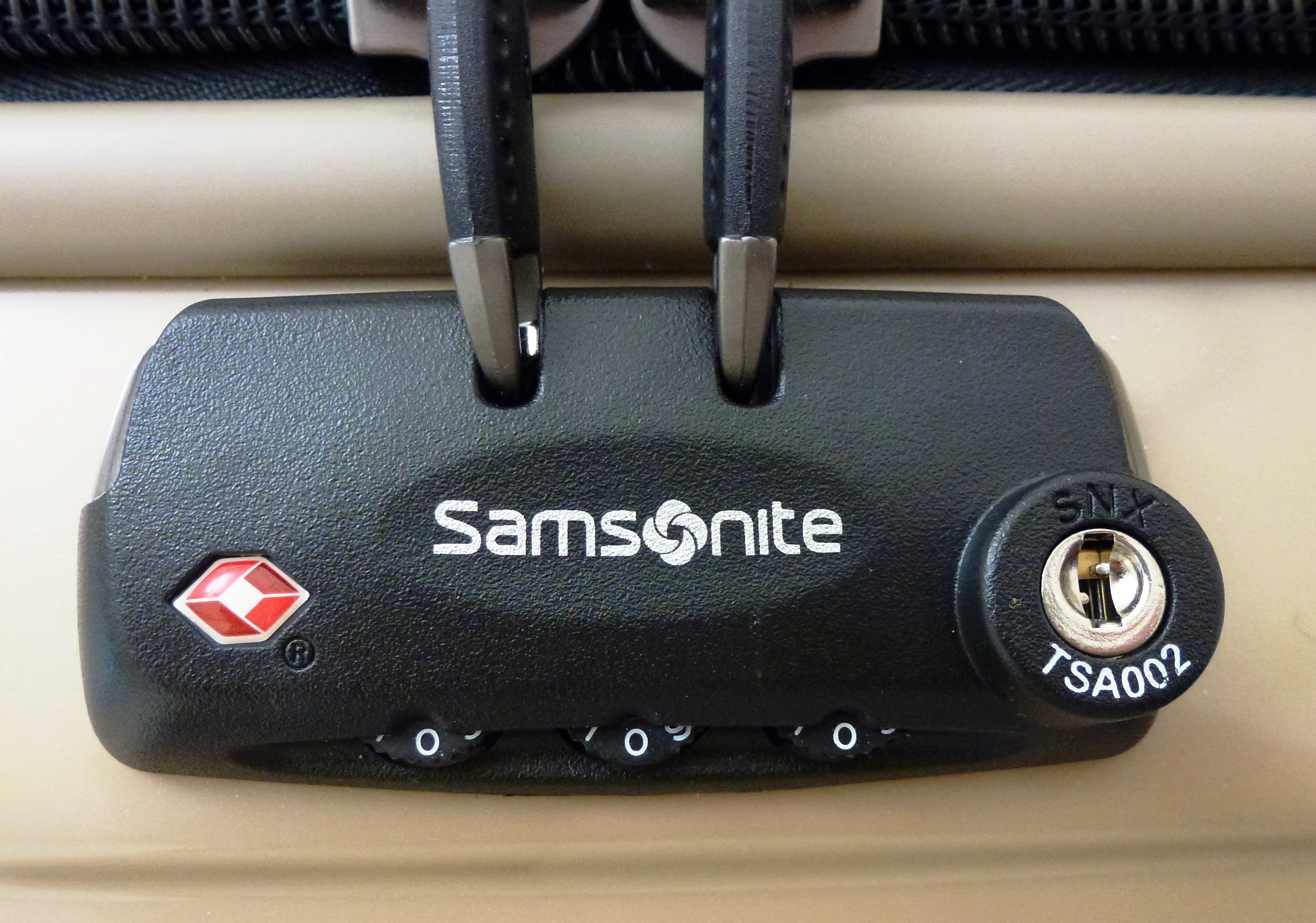
A Samsonite bag with a Travel Sentry logo

== Master key compromise ==
In a 2014 article in the Washington Post, a picture of the special tools was included, and while this picture was later removed, it quickly spread. Security researchers have pointed out that anyone can now make new master keys and open the locks without any sign of entry, and the locks can be considered compromised. It is likely that professional thieves have possessed the master keys well before the publication, perhaps by reverse engineering the TSA-approved locks, and a photo of the keys was previously uploaded in 2011.

In 2015, a year after the leak, Ars Technica reported that a group of hackers had put together 3D printable model files of the TSA keys and uploaded them on Github. Ars Technica printed and tested them out on two Travel Sentry locks, unlocking both of them. In 2016, the same group of hackers were involved in 3D printing master keys of Safe Skies, Travel Sentry's competitor, showing that neither brand's locks were safe from being unlocked by anyone.

== See also ==
- Okoban
