= National Explosives Detection Canine Team Program =

Transportation Security Administration program

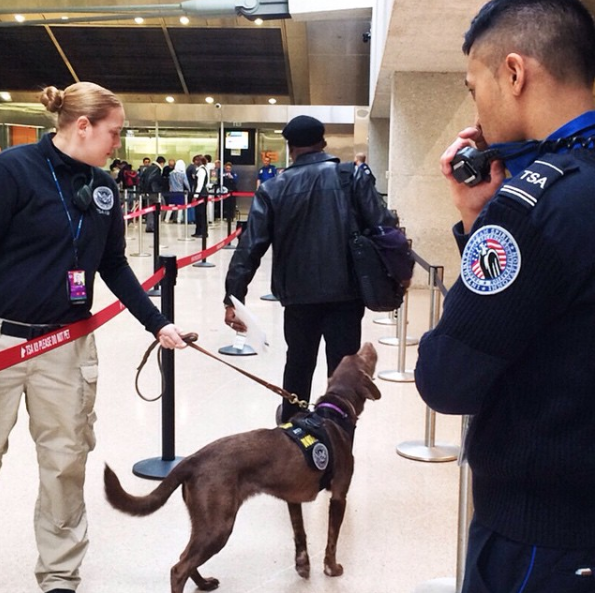
TSA explosives detection canine "Maggie" picking up on an explosives odor coming from the traveler’s backpack at Washington Dulles International Airport.

The National Explosives Detection Canine Team Program (NEDCTP) is a program administered by the United States Transportation Security Administration (TSA) which uses law enforcement and TSA-run explosives detection dog teams to detect explosives in transportation environments.

== History ==
The program was originally started in 1972 by the TSA's predecessor, the Federal Aviation Administration, who at the time, was responsible for aviation security in the United States. The program paired airport-based law enforcement officers with conventional explosive detection canines to detect explosives in objects such as vehicles and baggage.

Following the September 11th attacks, which resulted in the creation of the TSA, the NEDCTP was transferred from the FAA to the TSA and was completed by March 2003. In the following years, the TSA expanded the LEO teams to other modes of transportation, such as mass transit. In January 2008, the TSA began deploying their own unarmed teams where regulatory transportation security inspectors (TSI's) were paired with a canine to screen air cargo. In 2011, the TSA furthered the program by launching passenger screening canine (PSC) teams, which are explosive detection canines who besides detecting explosives in objects, can also detect explosives hidden on a person.

== Canines and training ==
The TSA sources their canines from the Department of Defense Military Working Dog program. The canines are trained at TSA's Canine Training Center, located at Lackland Air Force Base in San Antonio, Texas, also home to the Defense Department's Military Working Dog program.

The TSA uses the following breeds of canine for explosive detection work:

- Belgian Malinois
- German Shepherd
- German Shorthaired Pointer
- German Wirehaired Pointer
- Golden Retriever
- Labrador Retriever
- Vizsla

There are two types of explosive detection canines trained by the TSA:

- Conventional explosive detection canines (EDC) who undergo a 10-week training course accompanied by either an assigned LEO or TSA handler. EDC's are trained to recognize explosive odors coming from baggage and vehicles.
- Passenger screening canines (PSC) who undergo a 12-week training course accompanied by their TSA handler. PSC's are trained to recognize explosive odors on passengers plus odors from objects as an EDC does.

the TSA operates 372 canine teams consisting of a Transportation Security Specialist - Explosive Detection Canine Handler (TSS-EDCH) and a canine. Prior to 2017, the handler was classified as a Transportation Security Inspector - EDCH. The remaining 675 NEDCTP teams are made up of state and local law enforcement handlers.
