= Freedom Center (TSA) =

Center of operations for the Transportation Security Administration

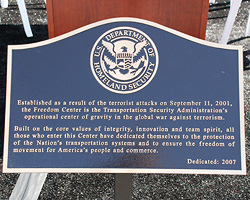
Dedication plaque

The Freedom Center, formerly known as the Transportation Security Operations Center (TSOC), is the Transportation Security Administration (TSA) operation center.

The building opened in July 2003 and is operational 24 hours a day and 7 days a week with agents actively responding to and investigating possible terrorist attacks.

This operation center serves as the main building for running the entire agency. It is located in Herndon, Virginia across the street from Dulles International Airport. It also houses the Federal Air Marshal Service, the Federal Aviation Administration, and Department of Defense. These agencies and departments work together to ensure the safety of American citizens.

Objects displayed inside the main lobby include a steel girder from the World Trade Center, a fragment of the wing of United Airlines Flight 93 recovered from its crash site in Shanksville, Pennsylvania, and pieces of the Pentagon's damaged concrete wall.

The facility was renamed the "Freedom Center" on June 21, 2007.

In 2023, the 20th anniversary of the Freedom Center's opening, the governor of Virginia, Glenn Youngkin, declared July 2023 as Freedom Center Month in the state of Virginia.
