= Public access file =

A public access file (sometimes capitalized as Public Access File, sometimes abbreviated as PAF, and also called a public examination file) is a file that needs to be maintained by any United States employer hiring people in H-1B, H-1B1, or E-3 temporary nonimmigrant worker statuses. It is intended to include more background information related to the attestations made on the Labor Condition Application used for the Form I-129 and/or visa application that was used to acquire the nonimmigrant worker status. The file may be requested by any member of the public through telephone or email inquiries. Any member of the public requesting access to the documents must be allowed to capture the information through such means as transcription, scanning, or taking photographs, for example. It is distinguished from a private access file that contains more sensitive and confidential employee data that must be shared with the U.S. Department of Labor if they choose to investigate. Regulations governing the public access file can be found in the Code of Federal Regulations, Title 20 (Employee Benefits), or more specifically, in 20 CFR 655.760 (note that that section does not itself use the term "public access file" but other sections that refer to it refer to it with that name).

== Contents of the file ==
We use the term "public access file" to refer to all the records associated with a specific LCA. In other words, to each LCA, there is one associated public access file, and different LCAs have different public access files. This holds even though much of the content of these files overlaps.

=== The Labor Condition Application itself ===
For LCAs submitted by paper, a copy of the certified LCA (Form ETA 9035E or Form ETA 9035) and cover pages (Form ETA 9035CP) must be included. If the LCA is submitted electronically, a printout of the certified application, signed by the employer, needs to be included.

=== Background information on the attestations made ===
The goal of the public access file is to provide more information explaining the basis of the attestations made in the Labor Condition Application. Below, we go over the list of the attestations made and any information that must be included in the public access file for those attestations.

==== Attestation #1: Wages ====
In the LCA, the employer must specify the wage that the non-immigrant worker(s) being hired via the LCA will be paid, and attest that the non-immigrant workers on behalf of whom the application is being made will be paid at or above both these numbers:

- The actual wage: This is the wage paid to other employees in the company who do the same work.
- The prevailing wage: This is the wage for that occupation in the geographical area of intended employment.

The employer must make similar attestation regarding non-wage benefits offered.

The public access file must contain four pieces of information relevant to the wage attestations:

- Documentation of the wage rate being paid to the non-immigrant worker(s).
- A full, clear explanation of the system the employer used to set the "actual wage" the employer has paid or will pay workers in the occupation for which the non-immigrant worker(s) is/are being sought. This should also include information on any periodic increases that the system may provide, such as a memorandum summarizing the employer's pay system or scale. Payroll records are not required in the public access file, but may be demanded by the Department of Labor in an audit.
- A full, clear explanation of the system the employer used to set the "prevailing wage" for the occupation in the intended area of employment. A general description of the source and methodology suffices. The underlying individual wage data relied upon is not a matter of public record, but may be demanded by the Department of Labor in an audit.
- A summary of benefits offered, as well as a statement on how differentiation in benefits is made when not all employees are offered or receive the same benefits. Where applicable, a statement that some/all of the non-immigrant workers are receiving home country benefits. The clause on benefits, along with the exception for home country benefits, was introduced as part of the American Competitiveness in the 21st Century Act.

==== Attestation #2: Working conditions ====
In the LCA, the employer must attest that the hiring of non-immigrant workers will not adversely affect the working conditions of similarly employed workers at the company, and that the non-immigrant workers will be offered similar working conditions as native US workers. The official regulations on the public access file do not mention any information that needs to be included regarding working conditions.

==== Attestation #3: Strike, lockout, or work stoppage ====
In the LCA, the employer must attest that on the day the application is filed, there is not a strike, lockout, or work stoppage in the named occupation at the place of employment and that, if such a strike, lockout, or work stoppage occurs after the application is submitted, the employer will notify ETA within three (3) days of such occurrence and the application will not be used to file a work authorization petition until the ETA has determined that the work stoppage has ceased.

The official regulations on the public access file do not mention any information that needs to be included regarding strikes, lockouts, or work stoppages.

==== Attestation #4: Notice ====
In the LCA, the employer must attest that as of the date of application, notice of the application has been or will be provided both to workers within the company in the said application. Also, the (prospective) workers on whose behalf the application is filed must be provided a copy of the application.

The public access file must include proof of satisfying union/employee notification requirements. For non-union positions this means the posting notice.

The employer must maintain additional evidence that the LCA was posted for at least ten business days (about two weeks) in two conspicuous locations. This evidence need only be included in the private access file.

=== Requirements surrounding change in corporate structure ===
When the employer undergoes a change in corporate structure, the public access file must be amended to include a sworn statement by a responsible official of the new employing entity that it accepts all obligations, liabilities and undertakings under the LCAs filed by the predecessor employing entity, together with a list of each affected LCA and its date of certification, and a description of the actual wage system and FEIN of the new employing entity.

=== Requirements relevant to H-1B-dependent employers and willful violators ===
The following are relevant to H-1B-dependency. Employers who are H-1B-dependent, or who come close to being H-1B-dependent, may have some of these apply:

- Where the employer utilizes the definition of "single employer" in the IRC, a list of any entities included as part of the single employer in making the determination as to its H-1B-dependency status.
- Where the employer is H-1B-dependent and/or a willful violator, and indicates on the LCA(s) that only "exempt" H-1B nonimmigrants will be employed, a list of such "exempt" H-1B nonimmigrants.
- Where the employer is H-1B-dependent or a willful violator and indicates the LCA will not be used to only support exempt workers, it must include documents summarizing the principal recruitment methods used and the time frame(s) in which such recruitment methods were used. This helps provide substantiation of the additional attestations regarding recruitment and hiring that H-1B-dependent employers and willful violators need to make.

== Retention requirements ==
The employer shall retain copies of the records required for a period of one year beyond the last date on which any H-1B nonimmigrant is employed under the labor condition application or, if no nonimmigrants were employed under the labor condition application, one year from the date the labor condition application expired or was withdrawn. This one-year requirement pertains only to public access files; payroll records (that need to be maintained privately for a Department of Labor audit) need to be maintained for three years since the payment was made.

== Compliance burden and penalties ==
The employer must provide the public access file of any employee to any member of the public who requests it by phone or email. Failure to provide the public access file is, in and of itself, considered a compliance failure, regardless of whether there was any intent to deceive or inaccuracies in LCA attestations. However, as the H-1B Visa Reform Act of 2004 clarifies, violations will not be cited in case of good faith efforts to comply, if records are corrected within 10 days, and there is no general pattern of willful violations.

It is generally advised not to include any information in the public access file beyond that mandated by law, since additional information can compromise the privacy of employees and of the company. The additional information that may be demanded in an audit, such as payroll records, full details of wage calculations and H-1B dependency calculations, and evidence of duration of notice posting, needs to be maintained in a private access file.
