= H-1B-dependent employer =

United States labor terminology

The term H-1B-dependent employer is used by the United States Department of Labor to describe an employer who meets a particular threshold in terms of the fraction of the workforce comprising workers in H-1B status. An employer classified as H-1B-dependent needs to include additional attestations in the Labor Condition Application used for the petition of any H-1B beneficiary being offered an annual compensation of less than $60,000 and without a master's degree. The notion was introduced by the American Competitiveness and Workforce Improvement Act (ACWIA) passed in 1998 and operationalized through the United States Department of Labor's Interim Final H-1B Rule of December 20, 2000. The regulation is found in 20 CFR 655.736 in the Code of Federal Regulations.

One of the key goals of the concept of H-1B-dependence is to curtail the use of H-1B visas for the replacement of American skilled workers by cheaper labor from other countries. The demarcation of H-1B-dependency is intended to strike a balance between the need to prevent large-scale use of the H-1B to facilitate "cheap labor" against the goal of minimizing the regulatory burden on employers who use the H-1B sparingly. Employers satisfying slight variations of the criterion for H-1B-dependence have been targeted for additional H-1B fees (by Public Law 111-230 and 114–113). H-1B reform proposals have suggested various ways of capping the use of the H-1B program by H-1B-dependent workers, but strict caps have never been legislatively or administratively imposed.

H-1B-dependence is not relevant to Labor Condition Applications filed for H-1B1 and E-3 workers.

== Definition and applicability ==
Section 1a of the LCA seeks to classify the employer filing the LCA into one of three categories:

- The employer is not H-1B-dependent
- The employees being petitioned for are exempt nonimmigrants
- The employees being petitioned for are not exempt, and the employer is therefore including the additional attestations

=== Thresholds for defining H-1B-dependence ===
The following are the thresholds for determining whether an employer is classified as H-1B-dependent. Note that for the first column below, only employees in the United States should be counted, but this can include other employees on H-1B or another temporary worker status, as well as United States citizens and lawful permanent residents.

Number of full-time equivalent employees in the United States	Minimum number of H-1B nonimmigrant workers necessary to make the employer H-1B-dependent	How threshold varies as a percentage of total number of employees
1 to 25	8 or more	100% (at 8 employees) down to 32%. Note that a consequence of this rule is that employers with 7 or fewer FTE employees cannot be classified as H-1B-dependent.
26 to 50	13 or more	50% down to 26%. Note the sudden upward jump in the threshold from 25 to 26 employees, making it advantageous to cross the threshold.
51 or more	15% or more of the workforce	15%. Note the sudden downward jump in the threshold from 50 to 51 employees, making it disadvantageous to cross this threshold.

=== Exempt nonimmigrant ===
Even for a H-1B-dependent employer, a nonimmigrant is considered exempt from the additional H-1B attestations if either of these two conditions is satisfied:

- The worker is being paid $60,000 or more in annual compensation.
- The worker holds a master's or higher degree or its equivalent in a specialty related to the intended employment. Equivalent foreign degrees are allowed.

All currently employed H-1B employees count toward the number of H-1B employees when used to determine H-1B-dependence, regardless of whether they were themselves exempted from the attestations.

==== Exemption based on compensation ====
For exemption based on compensation, only salary and cash bonuses can be counted towards compensation. Non-cash benefits (such as stock) cannot be included.

This criterion differs somewhat from the conditions of the attestation on wages needed for all LCAs. The wage attestation in the LCA says that the wage paid to the worker is greater than or equal to both the prevailing wage for that occupation and area of intended employment, and to the actual wage paid to other workers at the company. In many cases (such as highly skilled professions and/or jobs in expensive urban areas) the minimum annual compensation needed to satisfy these attestations is in excess of $60,000. However, this is not always the case.

The exemption threshold of $60,000 is not automatically adjusted for inflation and has not been changed since the rule was introduced.

==== Exemption based on educational qualifications ====
The educational criterion is intermediate between two other educational criteria used in the context of H-1B petitions:

- It is stricter than the educational criterion used to establish that one is a skilled worker in the Form I-129 petition for H-1B status. That petition allows for the use of work experience in lieu of educational credentials, whereas a nonimmigrant can be exempted only in the presence of an actual master's degree.
- It is weaker than the criterion used to determine eligibility for the 20,000 cap-exempt slots every fiscal year. Those cap-exempt slots are available only to people who acquired master's degree at United States universities, whereas a nonimmigrant can be exempted based on a master's degree from a United States university or foreign university.

DOL uses guidelines published by the American Association of Collegiate Registrars and Admissions Officers to determine degree equivalency. Note that the DOL regulation does not have a direct bearing on how USCIS evaluates degree equivalency when evaluating Form I-129 petitions based on an approved LCA.

=== Attestations needed ===
The following attestations are needed for LCAs filed by a H-1B-dependent employer filing for a non-exempt H-1B nonimmigrant. Even though H-1B-dependence is a global designation applied to the company, the assertion made by the attestations differs based on the specific position in which the worker is being employed. Therefore, an employer who can truthfully make the attestations for one type of worker (such as software engineer) may be unable to do so for another type of worker (such as manager). For positions where no H-1B workers are being hired, there is no need to meet the criteria for these attestations even if the employer is H-1B-dependent.

Moreover, since the attestations are time-bound (insofar as they refer to activity between 90 days before and 90 days after the Form I-129 filing) they may not remain true forever.

==== (A) Displacement ====
The employer promises not to displace any similarly employed US worker within the period beginning 90 days before and ending 90 days after the date of filing the H-1B nonimmigrant petition; this is not the date of the LCA filing.

==== (B) Secondary Displacement ====
The employer promises not to place the employee at another employer's worksite unless the employer has made a bona fide inquiry as to whether the other employer has displaced or intends to displace a US worker any time between 90 days before and 90 days after the placement, and has no contrary knowledge. If the other employer makes such a displacement, the employer applicant may be subject to civil money penalties and disbarment.

==== (C) Recruitment and Hiring ====
Prior to filing any petition for a H-1B nonimmigrant pursuant to the application, the employer took or will take good faith steps to meet industry-wide standards to recruit US workers for the job for which the nonimmigrant is sought, offering compensation at least as great as that required to be offered to the non-immigrant. The employer will (has) offer(ed) the job to an equally or better qualified US worker.

Ordinary LCAs do not require any attestation to demonstrate good-faith effort to hire a United States. In this respect, ordinary LCAs differ from Permanent Labor Certification, which requires evidence of good-faith effort to recruit US workers. However, even with these additional attestations, the requirements faced by LCA are less onerous than those for labor certification. One key difference is that whereas labor certification requires waiting for several months to try to hire for the specific position, the attestations on LCAs only require one to meet industry-wide general hiring standards.

=== H-1B1 and E-3 employees do not count towards the threshold ===
There are two variants of the H-1B status that also require the filing of a Labor Condition Application: the H-1B1 status for nationals of Singapore and Chile, and the E-3 status for nationals of Australia. The concept of H-1B-dependence does not matter for LCAs of employees for these classifications. Moreover, employees in these categories do not count toward the thresholds for determining H-1B-dependence.

== Details around definitions and documentation ==
=== Definition of full-time equivalent employee ===
Since being classified as H-1B-dependent requires employers to incur additional cost and complexity, and the threshold for H-1Bs generally increases with the number of full-time equivalent employees reported (with the exception of the downward jump from 50 to 51) employers are incentivized to make their count of full-time-equivalent employees as large as possible. The regulations are therefore geared to restricting employers from overcounting the number of FTEs.

The 2000 Interim Final Rule from the U.S. Department of Labor provided the following guidance regarding the definition of full-time equivalent employee for the purpose of determining H-1B-dependence.

==== What counts as a United States employee ====
To count as a United States employee, the person must be employed in the United States. United States employees include United States citizens and lawful permanent residents, as well as H-1B employees in the United States. For multinational firms, employees in other countries cannot be counted. In particular, this is important for multinationals because the ability to count employees outside the United States in the denominator could mean the difference between being classified as H-1B-non-dependent and H-1B-dependent. According to the official rules, the list of employees should be determined from the most recent quarterly tax statements unless these fail to include all employees.

==== What counts as full-time ====
Any employee who works 40 or more hours a week is treated as one full-time equivalent. An employee who works less than 35 hours a week cannot be treated as a full-time equivalent. Employees who work between 35 and 40 hours may be treated as full-time equivalent if this is accepted in the employer's regular course of business.

For employees who are less than full-time, the employer can choose one of these two methods:

1. Count each such employee as 1/2 of a full-time equivalent.
2. Total the hours worked by each employee and divide by the employer's standard hours of full-time employment (which must be at least 35 hours).

An employee who works more than 40 hours a week cannot be counted as more than one full-time equivalent.

The number of hours worked per employee should be computed based on the employer's most recent payroll record.

==== What counts as an employee ====
Independent contractors and consultants are not counted as employees. The U.S. Department of Labor will count somebody as an employee only if that person is treated as an employee for all tax and legal purposes, including FICA contributions, as per United States labor law.

==== Combining all entities as a "single employer" ====
Related entities need to also be included when computing the total number of FTE employees for the purpose of determining H-1B-dependency (although they are not relevant to the rest of the LCA). In particular, the following are all included as the "single employer":

1. Controlled groups of corporations: such as a parent-subsidiary controlled group, a brother-sister-controlled group, or a combined group;
2. Trades or businesses under common control: which can include sole proprietorships, partnerships, estates, trusts, and corporations; or
3. Affiliated service groups: such as a service organization (health care organization, law firm, accounting firm) and other organizations that regularly perform services for the first organization and either are shareholders or partners in the first organization or the interest in the second organization is held by highly-paid employees of the first organization.

=== What triggers a H-1B-dependency calculation ===
An employer must determine H-1B-dependency status every time the employer files a Labor Condition Application. Further, if an employer who did not file as H-1B-dependent at the time of filing the LCA becomes H-1B-dependent when filing Form I-129, the employer cannot use the LCA and must obtain a new one.

=== Procedure to determine dependency, and documentation needed ===
Since H-1B-dependent status requires additional attestations, employers have incentives to be classified as non-dependent. Therefore, there is a stronger burden of proof to maintain and submit documentation in cases where an employer who prima facie appears H-1B-dependent (or borderline) files as a non-dependent.

As part of the exercise of filling an LCA, an employer can use a "snap shot" test: do a headcount of the workforce and of the current H-1B employees, and then compare against the thresholds. This snap shot should be conducted using the records of the most recent payroll.

An employer who comes out as clearly H-1B-non-dependent or H-1B-dependent may file the LCA accordingly without submitting any additional documentation. If, however, an employer who comes out as H-1B-dependent based on the snap shot then files as non-dependent, the employer must have documentation showing this. Typical complicating factors that make an employer's status ambiguous include the extensive use of part-time workers, existence of multiple entities that need to be grouped as a "single employer", and significant employee churn.

=== Public access file ===
The U.S. Department of Labor does not require all petitions to be in the public access file, but it does require the public access file to contain the list of all exempt nonimmigrants. However, if all petitions filed by the employer are for exempt nonimmigrants, then this list need not be maintained.

Additional documentation of employee lists and payroll, that was used to determine H-1B-dependency, should be maintained by the employer, but does not need to be part of the public access file.

== Additional fees ==
H-1B-dependence itself does not trigger any additional fees. However, at various points in the history of H-1B law, additional fees have been levied on employers satisfying conditions similar to H-1B-dependency. These are employers who have more than 50 full-time employee equivalents and with the number of H-1B and L-1 nonimmigrants at present equal to more than 50% of their current number of FTE equivalents. The corresponding threshold for H-1B-dependency is 15%, but one way these thresholds differ is that the 50% threshold for the additional fees requires the employer to count people in H-1B as well as people in L-1 status. Also, unlike the case of additional LCA attestations, there is no exemption for people based on how much they are earning or their educational qualifications.

Whereas the concept of H-1B-dependence is used only by the United States Department of Labor, the extra fees here are levied by the United States Citizenship and Immigration Services.

=== Public Law 111-230 (August 2010 to September 2015): additional fee of $2000 ===
Section 402 of Public Law 111–230, signed by then-United States President Barack Obama on August 13, 2010, imposed an additional fee of $2,000 on certain H-1B nonimmigrant petitions and $2,250 on certain L-1A and L-1B petitions. All the petitions involved are filed using Form I-129, and these fees apply over and above any applicable fees for those forms. As mentioned above, an employer was required to pay the additional H-1B fees only in the case that the employer had 51 or more employees and H-1B and L-1 employees together comprised over 50% of the workforce.

The fee would apply only to petitions on postmarked on or after August 14, 2010, and until September 30, 2014. Public Law 111-347 extended these fees till September 30, 2015. Petitions filed October 1, 2015 onward were no longer subject to these fees.

=== Public Law 114-113 (December 2015 to September 2025) : additional fee of $4000 ===
Public Law 114–113, part of the Consolidated Appropriations Act, 2016, imposed a fee of $4,000 on H-1B petitions and $4,500 on L-1A and L-1B petitions. The additional H-1B fees would apply to all petitions postmarked on or after December 18, 2015, and until September 30, 2025.

== List of H-1B-dependent employers ==
The latest list of the companies identified as H-1B-dependent_employers in their LCA filings can be obtained from the DoL "Disclosure data". In the data file, the column H-1B_DEPENDENT will have a Y or N value (Y = Employer is H-1B Dependent; N = Employer is not H-1B Dependent) indicating the status the company used in the filing.

== H-1B-dependence among top users of the H-1B program ==
The top users of the H-1B program and their H-1B-dependent status given by employers from LCAs filed for work start dates in 2016 were:

Company name	Number of H-1B visas approved in FY 2014	Classified as H-1B-dependent?
Tata Consultancy Services and others under the Tata Group	7149	Yes
Cognizant Technology Solutions and others under the Cognizant parent group	5228	Conflicting information in different LCAs
Infosys	4022	No
Wipro	3246	No
Accenture	2376	No
Tech Mahindra and others under the Mahindra Group	1850	No
IBM	1513	No
Syntel	1149	Yes
Larsen & Toubro	1001	Conflicting information in different LCAs
HCL Technologies	927	No

== History ==
=== Introduction in the ACWIA (1998) ===
The American Competitiveness and Workforce Improvement Act temporarily increased the annual caps for the H-1B status, since the cap was getting oversubscribed. Some interest groups, including some legislators, labor unions, and the White House, were concerned about the effects of these cap increases on native wages in the technology sector. The ACWIA included some concessions intended to address these concerns. The introduction of the concept of H-1B-dependency, intended to prevent employers from using this visa to facilitate large-scale offshoring, was one such concession. The Labor Condition Application was changed accordingly.

=== Interim Final Rule of 2000 ===
An Interim Final Rule published by the United States Department of Labor published in December 2000 provided more clarity on how employers should determine whether they are H-1B-dependent and what documentation they need to maintain. This rule remains the main guideline to this date.

=== Later introductions of other variants of the H-1B category ===
When the H-1B1 visa (for Singapore and Chile) and E-3 visa (for Australia) were added (between 2003 and 2005), and the Labor Condition Application was modified to include them, it was updated to reflect that employees in these categories would not necessitate additional attestations, and that these employees would not count towards the number of H-1B employees. Specifically Section 1a (subsection 1) of the LCA explicitly states that the Additional Employer Labor Condition Statements are for the H-1B only.

=== Introduction of additional fees ===
One of the ways employers responded to the generally increased regulations surrounding the H-1B, as well as the strict caps on the category, was to more liberally use the L-1 visa for intracompany transfers. In response, additional fees were levied for H-1B and L-1 applicants for employers with more than 50 employees for whom the total of H-1B and L-1 employees exceeded 50% of the United States workforce, as discussed in the additional fees section of this page. The fees have widely been viewed as a way for more high-paying technology firms (such as the technology firms in the San Francisco Bay Area), that generally have relatively small fractions of their workforce in H-1B status and pay higher wages, to reduce competition for a limited H-1B quota from offshoring and outsourcing firms that currently dominate H-1B usage.
