= Body shop =

Body shop or bodyshop may refer to:

- An automobile repair shop specialising in bodywork repairs
- The Body Shop, a chain of cosmetics stores
- Body shopping, a type of IT outsourcing
- The Body Shop, an interview segment by Jesse Ventura on 1980s WWE television broadcasts
