= H-1B visa =

US employment visa for specialty occupations

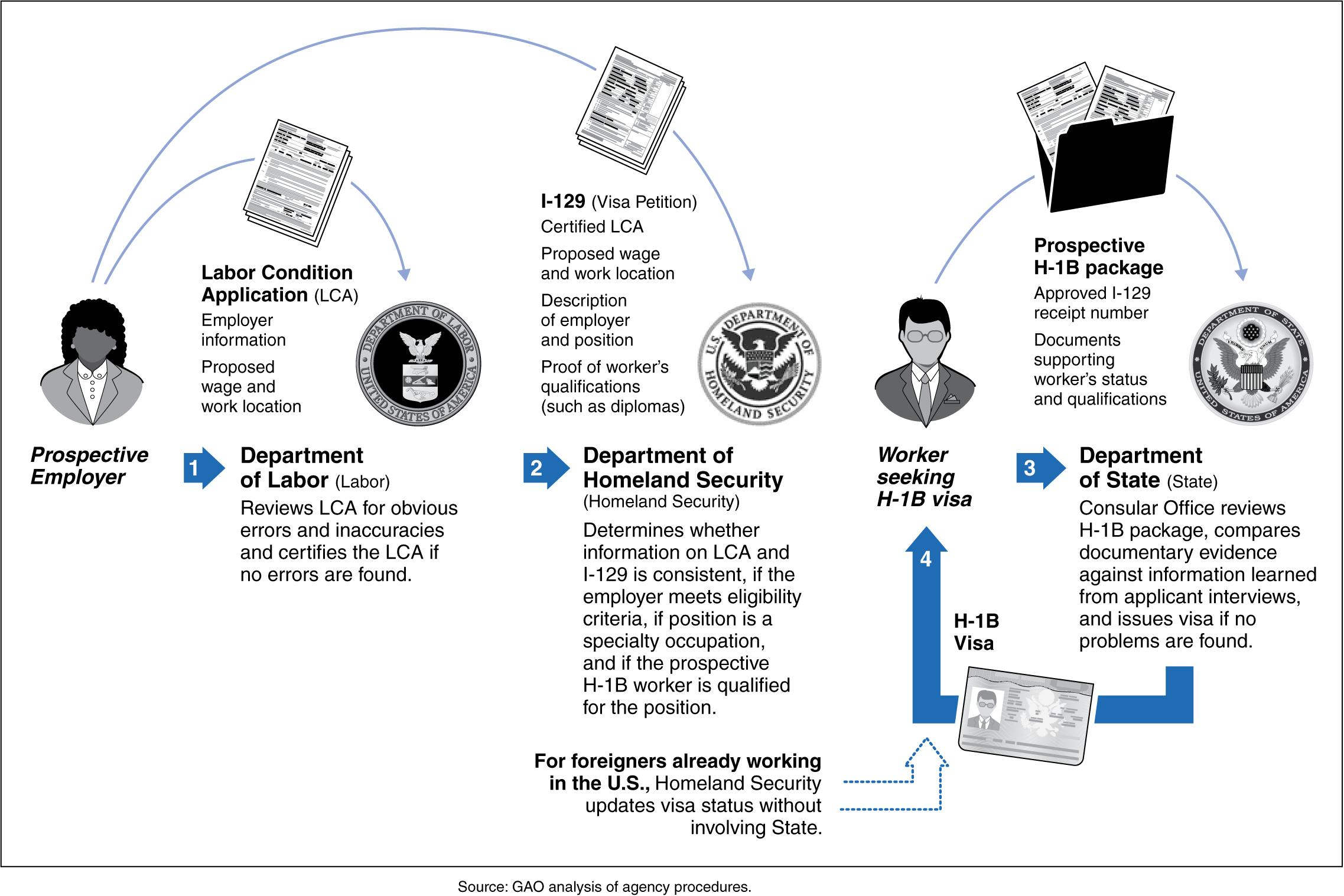
- Process of obtaining an H-1B visa
- Type: Non-immigrant work visa
- Purpose: Employment of foreign workers in specialty occupations

The H-1B is a classification of non-immigrant visa in United States that allows U.S. employers to hire foreign workers in specialty occupations, as well as fashion models, or persons who are engaged in Department of Defense projects who meet certain conditions. The regulation and implementation of visa programs are carried out by the United States Citizenship and Immigration Services (USCIS), an agency within the United States Department of Homeland Security (DHS). Foreign nationals may have H-1B status while present in the United States, and may or may not have a physical H-1B visa stamp.

INA section 101(a)(15)(H)(i)(b), codified at 8 USC 1184 (i)(1) defines "specialty occupation" as an occupation that requires

- (A) theoretical and practical application of a body of highly specialized knowledge, and
- (B) attainment of a bachelor's degree or higher degree in the specific specialty (or its equivalent) as a minimum for entry into the occupation in the United States.

H-1B visa status holders typically have an initial three-year stay in the U.S. They are entitled to a maximum of six years of physical presence in H-1B status. After reaching certain milestones in the green card process, H-1B status can be extended beyond the six-year maximum. The number of initial H-1B visas issued each fiscal year is capped at 65,000, with an additional 20,000 visas available for individuals who have earned a master's degree or higher from a U.S. institution, for a total of 85,000. Some employers are exempt from this cap. Sponsorship by an employer is required for applicants.

In 2019, the USCIS estimated there were 583,420 foreign nationals on H-1B visas in the United States. Between 1991 and 2022, the number of H-1B visas issued quadrupled. 265,777 H-1B visas were approved in 2022, the second-largest category of visa in terms of the number of foreign workers after the 310,676 H-2A visas issued to temporary, seasonal, agriculture workers.

H-1B visas have been politically controversial, with various actors seeking to expand or restrict the visa program. Studies have shown H-1B visas can lead to lower wages for competing workers, but that H-1B visas have had welfare-improving effects for Americans, leading to significant overall wage gains, lower consumer prices, greater innovation, and greater total factor productivity growth.

In 2025, the Trump administration imposed a $100,000 fee for filing for an H-1B visa starting September 2025 with exemptions for change of status, including those who are currently in the US on an F1 OPT student visa.

== Eligibility and application process ==
The H-1B visa is a non-immigrant visa in the United States that allows employers to hire foreign workers in specialty occupations, has an annual cap on the number of issued visas, and requires employers to submit paperwork that ensures compliance with various provisions of the law authorizing the visa.

=== Specialty occupation ===
H-1B visas, as defined by United States Code, are those jobs that require a "theoretical and practical application of a body of highly specialized knowledge" and a bachelor's degree or higher or the equivalent experience. In order to determine which jobs qualify under the law, the USCIS works with the Department of Labor and its Standard Occupational Classification database to determine a list of specific occupations.

=== Employment ===
To maintain H-1B visa status, visa holders must maintain employment with their sponsoring employer. If employment ends, the individual must either leave the U.S., seek a change of status, or obtain a new H-1B sponsorship. In 2017, USCIS implemented a grace period of up to 60 days following employment termination, during which the individual may remain in the United States to seek new employment or file for a change of status.

=== Duration of status ===
The duration of stay for an H-1B visa holder is typically six years. In 2000, some exemptions were added to increase the length of stay for some visa holders:

- Permanent Residency Applications: If the visa holder has filed a Form I-140 or a Permanent Labor Certification before the sixth year of having an H-1B visa, they may extend their H-1B status in one-year increments until the government decides whether to grant permanent residency status.
- Priority Date Delays: If an approved I-140 petition exists but the applicant cannot proceed with the green card process due to a backlog, they may be eligible for a three-year extension.
- Department of Defense Projects: H-1B holders working on specific Department of Defense projects may extend their visa up to ten years.

For certain countries, the three-year extension period has been set to one-year extensions for various reasons. For example, during Melania Trump's time as an H-1B visa holder, she was limited to one-year increments, which was the maximum time allowed for H-1B visa for citizens of Slovenia. Melania Trump became a U.S. citizen in 2006.

After six years, H-1B holders who have not obtained permanent residency must spend one year outside the U.S. before reapplying for another H-1B visa, unless they qualify for an extension under the exceptions mentioned above. Visa holders may change to a job in a specialized occupation other than the one they were approved for in their initial application provided their new job is considered a specialized occupation and that their employment is officially sponsored by their new employer.

=== Electronic registration process and lottery ===
USCIS uses an electronic registration system and lottery process to manage applications. Effective February 27, 2026, USCIS will select H-1B visa applicants using a system that makes it more likely that highly paid workers will receive H-1B visas. Workers will be classified into one of four levels based on the offered wage for their job and location of employment. The highest level will be entered into the lottery four times, the next highest level will be entered three times, the next highest level will be entered into the lottery two times, and the lowest level will be entered once.

American employers of H-1B workers must create an account on the USCIS online portal. This account enables them to submit registrations for prospective beneficiaries during the designated registration period.

USCIS announces dates for the registration period each fiscal year, typically in March. As of September 21, 2025, the registration fee is $100,000 per beneficiary. This fee is non-refundable and must be paid at the time of registration. Employers provide basic information about their company and each prospective beneficiary. USCIS states the streamlined process reduces the administrative burden compared to submitting full petitions initially.

The annual H-1B season officially starts in March of each year, when petitioners are allowed to register electronically for their applicant. If more registrations are submitted there will be a random selection, also called an H-1B lottery. After the registration period closes, USCIS conducts the lottery and notifies selected registrants. Employers with selected registrations have a limited period, typically 90 days, to submit completed H-1B petitions (Form I-129) for their beneficiaries. The earliest date for filing these petitions is usually April 1.

During the 2024 fiscal-year lottery, there were 758,994 eligible electronic registrations and 110,791 people selected for an H-1B visa.

Selected registrants can begin filing their Labor Condition Application with the Department of Labor on April 1. It allows a six-month window before the employee start date on October 1.

USCIS implements measures to prevent fraud and abuse in the registration process, including a beneficiary-specific selection process to prevent multiple registrations for the same individual by different employers. These measures aim to ensure a fair selection process.

In March 2017, a federal judge in Oregon dismissed a lawsuit challenging the H-1B visa lottery system, granting summary judgment in favor of USCIS, applying Chevron deference. The court's ruling acknowledged USCIS's discretion in implementing this system to address the overwhelming number of petitions received each year.

=== Labor Condition Application ===
Before an employer can hire a foreign worker under the H-1B visa program, the employer must submit a Labor Condition Application (LCA) to the U.S. Department of Labor for certification. The LCA ensures the employment of H-1B workers will not harm the wages or working conditions of U.S. workers in similar roles.

The LCA is designed to protect both U.S. and foreign workers by setting standards for wages and working conditions. Employers are prohibited from using the H-1B program to replace U.S. workers during labor disputes or to exploit foreign workers by offering substandard wages. Employers must keep detailed public records, making LCAs available for inspection by the Labor Department and members of the public upon request. The required forms to fulfill this requirement are Forms ETA-9035 and 9035. The Labor Department has different requirements for workers who are dependent on H-1B visa workers.

Employers hiring H-1B visa workers must:

- Pay the nonimmigrant workers at least the local prevailing wage or the employer's actual wage, whichever is higher; pay for non-productive time in certain circumstances; and offer benefits on the same basis as for U.S. workers;
- Provide working conditions for H-1B, H-1B1, or E-3 workers that will not adversely affect the working conditions of workers similarly employed;
- Not employ an H-1B, H-1B1, or E-3 worker at a location where a strike or lockout in the occupational classification is occurring, and notify ETA of any future strike or lockout; and
- On or within 30 days before the date the LCA is filed with ETA, provide notice of the employer's intent to hire H-1B, H-1B1, or E-3 workers. The employer must provide this notice to the bargaining representative of workers in the occupation in which the H-1B, H-1B1, or E-3 worker will be employed. If there is no bargaining representative, the employer must post such notices in conspicuous locations at the intended place(s) of employment, or provide them electronically.

According to additional rules for employers who are dependent upon H-1B workers or are willful violators of the H-1B rules:

- The employer will not displace any similarly employed U.S. worker within 90 days before or after the date of filing of any visa petition supported by an LCA;
- The employer will not place any H-1B worker employed pursuant to the LCA at the worksite of another employer unless the employer first makes a bona fide inquiry as to whether the other employer has displaced or intends to displace a similarly employed U.S. worker within 90 days before or after the placement of the H-1B worker, and the employer applicant has no contrary knowledge; and
- The employer, before petitioning for H-1B status for any alien worker pursuant to an H-1B LCA, took good faith steps to recruit U.S. workers for the job for which the alien worker is sought, at wages at least equal to those offered to the H-1B worker. Also, the employer will offer the job to any U.S. worker who applies and is equally or better qualified than the H-1B worker. This attestation does not apply if the H-1B worker is a "priority worker" (see Section 203(b) (1) (A), (B), or (C) of the INA).

Additional rules apply to employers who are dependent (15 percent or more of their workforce) or who have violated rules with the Department of Labor in the past. In 2025, the Department of Labor launched Project Firewall, a targeted H-1B enforcement for investigating employers suspected of program abuse. The program allows the Secretary of Labor to certify investigations based on “reasonable cause” and coordinates with other federal agencies to detect underpayment, misrepresentation, and improper job arrangements.

== Maintaining status ==
=== Taxation of H-1B visa holders ===
H-1B visa holders are taxed based on residency status under the Substantial Presence Test. Those present in the U.S. for at least 183 weighted days over three years are resident aliens and taxed on worldwide income. Others are nonresident aliens, taxed only on U.S.-sourced income.

H-1B workers must pay Social Security and Medicare taxes, unless exempt under a Totalization agreements. As such, visa holders may be eligible for receiving Social Security benefits upon retirement should the individual have enough credits and not barred by any totalization agreements with their home country. Employers also pay federal unemployment tax on their wages.

For tax filing, nonresidents use Form 1040-NR, while residents file Form 1040. Dual-status taxpayers (those changing residency status during the year) must file specialized returns.

H-1B holders who qualify for tax treaty benefits must file Form 8833, with additional forms for specific exemptions. Ensuring compliance with tax classification and reporting prevents penalties.

=== Dual intent ===
H-1B visas are considered "dual intent" because it is a temporary visa which gives visa holders the option to apply for permanent residency. Employers often support this process by sponsoring green card application for H-1B employees. Typically, visa holders will be working in the U.S. with the visa while they apply for permanent residency

H-1B1 visas are not dual intent.

=== Dependents of visa holders ===
H-1B visa holders can bring immediate family members, such as their spouse and children under 21, to the United States as dependents under the H-4 visa category.

An H-4 visa holder may remain in the U.S. as long as the H-1B visa holder retains legal status. An H-4 visa holder is allowed to attend school, apply for a driver's license, and open a bank account in the U.S.

=== Traveling outside the U.S. ===
When an H-1B worker travels outside the U.S. (except to Canada or Mexico for 30 days or less), they must have a valid visa stamp in their passport to re-enter the US. If their visa stamp has expired but they have an unexpired I-797 petition approval notice, they must visit a U.S. embassy and appear before a Department of State Consular Officer to obtain a new H-1B visa stamp.

Consular officers follow the Foreign Affairs Manual, which states that an approved USCIS petition confirms the basic requirements for H-1B classification have been met. However, officers do not re-evaluate whether the job qualifies as a specialty occupation or whether the applicant meets all position-related requirements.

While USCIS approval does not guarantee a visa, consular officers can only refuse issuance if they suspect fraud or misrepresentation. They rely on their cultural and local knowledge to assess credibility. If concerns arise, they may request additional evidence or take more time to decide. If issues are confirmed, the case is sent back to USCIS for review, where the petition is either reaffirmed or revoked. Consular officers themselves do not have the authority to revoke USCIS-approved petitions.

In some visa-application cases, H-1B workers can be required to undergo "administrative processing" involving extra background checks. Under current rules, these checks are supposed to take ten or fewer days but in some cases, have lasted years.

An individual with a valid H-1B visa does not need a visa to enter Costa Rica for tourism for up to 30 days. The H-1B visa must be stamped in the passport and be valid for at least six months. The passport must be valid for at least six months after entering Costa Rica.

==== Domestic Visa Renewal Pilot Program (2024) ====
The Department of State introduced a limited Domestic Visa Renewal Pilot Program from January 29 to April 1, 2024, to simplify the H-1B visa renewal process. This program allowed select H-1B visa holders who had previously received their visas from specific consulates in Canada or India to renew them within the U.S., avoiding the need for international travel.

Capped at 20,000 participants, the program offered 4,000 filing slots per week over five weeks. It was limited to H-1B renewals for applicants not subject to reciprocity fees or requiring in-person interviews. Those whose previous H-1B visa were marked “Clearance Received," indicating a prior Security Advisory Opinion, were not eligible to participate.

=== Unemployment ===
If an employer Layoff an H-1B worker, the employer is required to pay the "reasonable" costs of the laid-off worker's transportation outside the U.S. If an H-1B worker is laid off or quits, the worker has a grace period of 60 days or until the I-94 expiration date, whichever is shorter, to find a new employer or leave the country.

There is a 10-day grace period for an H-1B worker to depart the U.S. at the end of their authorized period of stay. This grace period applies only if the worker works until the H-1B expiration date listed on their I-797 approval notice or I-94 card.

== Annual cap ==
The H-1B visa program is subject to an annual cap of 65,000 visas, with an additional 20,000 visas available for applicants holding advanced degrees from U.S. institutions. Certain employers are exempt from these caps, including:

- institutions of higher education,
- nonprofit and governmental research organizations,
- cap-exemption employees (those who have already received H-1B visas),
- applications to work in the Northern Mariana Islands and Guam, and
- Chilean and Singaporean nationals.

Prospective H-1B workers seeking employment in the U.S. territories of the Northern Mariana Islands and Guam are exempt from the cap until December 31, 2029. If approved, visa holders may only work in the territory (NMI or Guam) for which they are approved.

The Chile–United States and Singapore–United States Free Trade Agreements establish separate annual quotas for citizens of Chile (1,400/year) and Singapore (5,400/year). Unused application quotas are added to the general cap for H-1B visas for the following year.

The E-3 visa is specifically designated for Australian citizens and not subject to the H-1B cap. E-3 visas offer an alternative route for Australian professionals to seek employment in the United States, has an annual cap of 10,500 visas per year, and a different duration and application process.

== History ==
=== Visa creation ===
On June 27, 1952, Congress passed the Immigration and Nationality Act after overriding a veto by President Harry S. Truman. For the first time, the Immigration and Nationality Act codified United States' immigration, naturalization, and nationality law into permanent statutes, and introduced a system of selective immigration by giving special preference to foreigners having skills that were urgently needed by the U.S. Several types of visas were established, including a H-1 visa for "an alien having a residence in a foreign country which he has no intention of abandoning who is of distinguished merit and ability and who is coming temporarily to the United States to perform temporary services of an exceptional nature requiring such merit and ability." The term "distinguished merit and ability" was not new to U.S. immigration law; it had previously been used as a qualification for musicians and artists who had wanted to enter the country. The visa was called an H-1 visa because it was enacted by section 101(15)(H)(1) of the Immigration and Nationality Act.

=== The Immigration Act of 1990 ===
President George H. W. Bush signed the Immigration Act of 1990 into law by on November 20, 1990. The H-1 visa was split into the H-1A visa for nurses, and the H-1B visa for workers in specialty occupations. The Immigration Act defined a specialty occupation as "an occupation that requires theoretical and practical application of a body of highly specialized knowledge, and attainment of a bachelor's or higher degree in the specific specialty (or its equivalent) as a minimum for entry into the occupation in the United States." To qualify, a visa applicant needed any applicable state license for the particular occupation, and either an educational degree related to the occupation or an equivalent amount of professional experience. For the first time, a quota of 65,000 H-1B visas available each fiscal year was established. Employers were required by law to pay such employees at least the prevailing wage for the position, and to make certain attestations by way of a Labor Condition Application.

=== The American Competitiveness and Workforce Improvement Act of 1998 ===
President Bill Clinton signed the American Competitiveness and Workforce Improvement Act of 1998 into law on October 21, 1998. The law required each application for an H-1B to include an additional $500 payment that would be used for retraining U.S. workers to reduce the future need for H-1B visas. The quota of H-1B visas was increased from 65,000 to 115,000 for fiscal years 1999 and 2000 only. For an employer with a large number of employees in H-1B status or one who had committed a willful misrepresentation in the recent past, the employer was required to attest the additional H-1B worker would not displace any U.S. workers. The act also gave investigative authority to the United States Department of Labor.

=== The American Competitiveness in the 21st Century Act of 2000 ===
On October 17, 2000, President Bill Clinton signed into law the American Competitiveness in the 21st Century Act, which increased the retraining fee from $500 to $1,000. The quota was increased to 195,000 H-1B visas in fiscal years 2001, 2002, and 2003 only. Nonprofit research institutions sponsoring workers for H-1B visas became exempt from the H-1B visa quotas.

Under the law, a worker in H-1B status who had already been subject to a visa quota would not be subject to quotas if requesting a transfer to a new employer or if applying for a three-year extension. An H-1B worker was now allowed to change employers if the worker had an I-485 application pending for six months and an approved I-140, and if the new job was substantially comparable to their current one.

In the case of an H-1B holder's spouse in H-4 status, the spouse may be eligible to work in the U.S under certain circumstances. The spouse must have an approved "Immigration Petition for Alien Worker" form or have been given H-1B status under sections 106(a) and (b) of the American Competitiveness in the 21st Century Act of 2000.

=== Free trade agreements in 2003 ===
Congress ratified the Singapore–United States Free Trade Agreement in 2003, and later that year, the Chile–United States Free Trade Agreement. With these free trade agreements, a new H-1B1 visa that was available solely for people from either Singapore or Chile was established. Unlike H-1B visas that had a limited renewal time, H-1B1 visas could be indefinitely renewed. H-1B1 visas are subject to a separate quota of 6,000 per fiscal year. Unlike H-1B visas, an H-1B1 visa is not a dual-intent visa, and an H-1B1 applicant must convince the visa officer they have no intention of permanently immigrating to the United States.

=== The H-1B Visa Reform Act of 2004 ===
The H-1B Visa Reform Act of 2004 was a part of the Consolidated Appropriations Act, 2005, which President George W. Bush signed on December 6, 2004. For employers with 26 or more employees, the retraining fee was increased from $1,000 to $1,500, and it was reduced to $750 for all other employers. A new $500 "anti-fraud fee" was to be paid by the employer with the visa application.

The H-1B quota returned to 65,000 per year and the law added 20,000 visas for applicants with master's degree or doctorate degree from a U.S. graduate school. Governmental entities became exempt from H-1B visa quotas. According to the law, H-1B visas that were revoked due to either fraud or willful misrepresentation would be added to the H-1B visa quota for the following fiscal year.

The law also allowed one-year extensions for H-1B visa holders who were applying for permanent residency and whose petitions had been pending for a long time. The Department of Labor had more investigative authority, but an employer could defend against misdeeds by using either the Good Faith Compliance Defense or the Recognized Industry Standards Defense.

=== Proposed legislation in 2007 ===
In 2007, Senators Dick Durbin of Illinois and Charles Grassley of Iowa began introducing "The H-1B and L-1 Visa Fraud & Prevention Act" in 2007. According to Durbin, speaking in 2009: "The H-1B visa program should complement the U.S. workforce, not replace it ... The ... program is plagued with fraud and abuse and is now a vehicle for outsourcing that deprives qualified American workers of their jobs." Compete America, a tech industry lobbying group, opposed the proposed legislation.

=== The Consolidated Natural Resources Act of 2008 ===
The Consolidated Natural Resources Act of 2008 federalized immigration in the U.S. territory of the Commonwealth of the Northern Mariana Islands, and it stipulated during a transition period, numerical limitations would not apply to otherwise qualified workers in the H visa category in the U.S. territories of Guam and the Northern Mariana Islands. The exemption does not apply to any employment to be performed outside of those territories.

=== The Employ American Workers Act of 2009 ===
The Employ American Workers Act, as part of the American Recovery and Reinvestment Act of 2009, was signed into law by President Barack Obama on February 17, 2009. Employers who applied to sponsor a new H-1B applicant and who had received funds under either the Troubled Asset Relief Program (TARP) or the Federal Reserve Act Section 13 were required to attest the additional H-1B worker would not displace any U.S. workers, and that the employer had not laid off and would not lay off any U.S. worker in a job equivalent to the H-1B position in the area of intended employment of the H-1B worker in the period beginning 90 days prior to the filing of the H-1B petition and ending 90 days after its filing.

=== Proposed legislation in 2017–2018 ===
In 2017, the U.S. Congress considered more-than doubling the minimum wage for an H-1B holder from the $60,000 (USD) established in 1989 and unchanged since then. The High Skilled Integrity and Fairness Act, which U.S. Rep. Zoe Lofgren of California introduced, would raise H-1B holders' minimum salaries to $130,000. The Indian press criticized the action for confirming "the worst fears of [Indian] IT companies" following the reforms discussed during the 2016 Presidential election by both major candidates, and for causing a 5% drop in the Bombay Stock Exchange’s BSE SENSEX index. Though, India in general has been welcoming this change and requirement since 2015. Lofgren's office described it as a measure to "curb outsourcing abuse," citing unfair tech hiring practices by employers including Disney and University of California San Francisco.

=== Executive action history ===
Since 2008, USCIS has updated and issued new rules regarding the H-1B visa.

==== STEM Optional Practical Training extension and cap-gap extension ====
On April 2, 2008, Homeland Security Secretary Michael Chertoff announced a 17-month extension to Optional Practical Training for STEM students, as part of the H-1B Cap-Gap Regulations. This extension allows foreign STEM students to work in the U.S. for up to 29 months on a student visa, providing additional time to secure H-1B sponsorship.

To qualify for the standard 12-month OPT, a bachelor’s degree in any field is acceptable. However, the 17-month STEM extension requires a degree in an approved STEM major, as listed by USCIS. The cap-gap extension, introduced alongside this rule, allows STEM OPT workers with pending or approved H-1B petitions to remain in the U.S. while awaiting the start of their H-1B status.

==== The 2010 Neufeld Memo ====
On January 8, 2010, USCIS issued a memorandum clarifying that a valid employer-employee relationship must exist between an H-1B employer and visa-holding employee, although the memo was ultimately not implemented. The memo stated that employers must demonstrate control over when, where, and how the employee performs their work to maintain compliance.

A valid employer-employee relationship typically includes:

- supervision of the employee, either on-site or remotely.
- control over work assignments, schedules, and tasks.
- provision of tools, equipment, and resources necessary for the job.
- authority to hire, pay, evaluate, and terminate employment.
- employee benefits and use of employer-provided proprietary information.

The memo emphasized that common law principles guide the assessment of these factors.

Third-party placement firms and staffing agencies generally do not qualify for H-1B sponsorship. Senator John Cornyn helped negotiate a halt to the memo’s implementation following concerns from IT outsourcing firms.

==== 2015 H-1B dependent work authorization ====
Under this rule, an H-1B worker’s spouse in H-4 status may obtain work authorization if the H-1B holder is either:

1. the principal beneficiary of an approved I-140, or
2. maintaining H-1B status under the American Competitiveness in the Twenty-first Century Act of 2000.

DHS implemented this rule to ease financial burdens on families transitioning from non-immigrant to permanent resident status. It also helps retain high-skilled workers by reducing incentives for them to leave the U.S., preventing disruptions for their employers and the economy.

==== 2015 work site guidance change ====
In 2015, USCIS issued final guidance stating if an H-1B worker whose worksite location changes to a different metropolitan area, it is a material change that requires the employer to certify a new Labor Condition Application to the DHS. Temporary worksite changed do not require a new LCA. Examples include a H-1B worker attending a training session, seminar, or conference of short duration, or a temporary moved to a short-term placement of fewer than 30 days. If the amended H-1B petition is disapproved but the original petition remains valid, the H-1B worker retains their H-1B status as long as they return to work at the original worksite.

==== 2016 H-1B maximum stay clarification ====
On December 5, 2016, USCIS issued a memorandum to provide guidance for periods of admissions for an individual in H-1B status. The memorandum stated time spent as either an H-4 dependent or an L-2 dependent does not reduce the maximum allowable period of stay available to individuals in H-1B status.

==== 2017 employment termination grace period rule ====
On November 18, 2017, United States Citizenship and Immigration Services released a rule that affects individuals in H-1B status whose employment ends. In these cases, the individual has a grace period of 60 days to leave the United States or change to another legal status that allows them to remain in the United States.

==== 2017 H-4 victims of domestic violence work authorization ====
In 2005, the Violence Against Women and Department of Justice Reauthorization Act allowed work authorization for victims of domestic violence who are in H-4 status.

On February 17, 2017, USCIS implemented a process for certain H-4 nonimmigrants who are victims of domestic violence to apply for work authorization under the category ‘‘(c)(31)’’, similar to VAWA self-petitioners.

Eligible individuals include current H-1B visa spouses and individuals whose marriage ended because of battery or extreme cruelty perpetrated by the individual's former spouse. The individual must have entered the U.S. in an H status, must continue to be in H-4 status, and were themselves or their child battered or subjected to extreme cruelty by the H-1B spouse. The spouse's application must include evidence of the abuse. Before this policy was implemented, an abused spouse in H-4 status would be required to leave the U.S. on the date the person divorced the abusive spouse. The divorced spouse may now legally remain in and work in the U.S. after the divorce is finalized or pending. If approved, the authorization is valid for two years.

==== 2017 computer-programming position memo ====
A memorandum from December 22, 2000 stated because most computer-programming positions required a bachelor's degree, computer programming was considered a specialty occupation that qualified for an H-1B visa. On March 31, 2017, USCIS released a memorandum stating computer programming would no longer be automatically considered a specialty occupation, partly because a bachelor's degree was no longer typically required for these positions. An application for an H-1B visa for a computer programmer must sufficiently describe the duties, and the level of experience and responsibilities of the position to demonstrate how the position is senior, complex, specialized, or unique rather than an entry-level position to qualify for an H-1B visa. In addition, the Department of Justice warned employers not to discriminate against U.S. workers by showing a preference for hiring H-1B workers.

==== 2017 Buy American, Hire American executive order ====
On April 18, 2017, President Donald Trump signed an executive order directing federal agencies to implement a "Buy American, Hire American" strategy, a key pledge of his campaign. At a press briefing, the executive order directed federal agencies such as the Department of Labor, the Department of Justice, the DHS, and the Department of State to implement a new system that favored higher-skilled, higher-paid applicants. The executive order was intended to order federal agencies to review and propose reforms to the H-1B visa system. Furthermore, these departments will "fill in the details with reports and recommendations about what the administration can legally do." Trump stated the executive order would "end the theft of American prosperity," which he said had been brought on by low-wage immigrant labor.

On January 9, 2018, the USCIS said it was not considering any proposal that would force H-1B visa holders to leave the U.S. during the green-card process. USCIS said an employer could request extensions in one-year increments under section 106(a)–(b) of the American Competitiveness in the 21st Century Act instead.

==== 2018 extension rejection rule ====
On June 28, 2018, the USCIS announced when a person's request for a visa extension is rejected, the person will be deported from the country. The Trump administration said it was not considering any proposal that would force H-1B visa holders to leave the country.

==== 2020 H-1B entry suspension ====
On April 22, 2020, President Trump signed a presidential proclamation that temporarily suspended the entry of people with non-immigrant visas, including H-1B visas. On June 22, 2020, President Trump extended the suspension for H-1B visa holders until December 31, 2020. On December 31, 2020, Trump issued a presidential proclamation extending the suspension of entry until March 31, 2021, because they would pose "a risk of displacing and disadvantaging United States workers during the economic recovery following the COVID-19 outbreak."

==== 2020 H-1B lottery rule ====
On October 28, 2020, USCIS promulgated a new rule to reform the H-1B lottery by prioritizing workers with the highest wage was approved.

==== 2021 H-1B entry suspension expiration ====
President Joe Biden allowed the suspension to expire on March 31, 2021, which allowed H-1B visa holders to enter the U.S. beginning on April 1, 2021.

==== 2025 presidential proclamation ====
On September 19, 2025, President Donald Trump signed a proclamation that required a one-time $100,000 fee when an employer applies for an H-1B visa for a worker between September 21, 2025, and September 21, 2026. The new fee was in addition to the application fees that were already in effect. The $100,000 fee was required for initial visa application for a worker but not for H-1B visa renewals.

The $100,000 payment was not required for workers whose H-1B visa was issued before September 21, 2025. The $100,000 payment was not required if the U.S. Secretary of Homeland Security decided that the hiring of a particular H-1B visa holder, all H-1B visa holders working at a company, or all such H-1B visa holders working in a particular industry was in the national interest of the U.S. and was not a threat to the U.S.

The presidential proclamation did not change any rules about H-1B holders' travel outside the U.S. nor their return to the U.S.

Prior to the change, an H-1B visa application cost approximately $1,500.

Amazon was the top recipient of H-1B visas for fiscal year 2025, with over 10,000 visas approved. Microsoft, Meta, Apple, Tata and Google also received a substantial number of H-1B visas in 2025.

On June 8, 2026, a federal judge ruled that the $100,000 fee was unlawful because the president's proclamation intruded on Congress's taxing power.

==== Expansion of biometric fee ====
Effective September 9, 2026, employers filing an extension-of-status petition will be required to be a $4,000 biometric fee if they have at least 50 U.S. employees and the majority their U.S. workers are in H-1B, L-1A, or L-1B status.

==== Proposed increased filing fee ====
On August 25, 2026, the Department of Homeland Security proposed a new rule to establish a $103,265 fee for all H-1B cap-subject petitions. The new fee will be required to be paid when the H-1B application is filed. All H-1B cap-subject petitions will be required to pay the new fee including those that are eligible for the advanced degree exemption and individuals who are either inside or outside the US at the time of filing. The new fee will be in addition to the fees that are already required. Employers that are exempt from the annual H-1B cap, such as universities, affiliated nonprofit organizations, and certain research organizations, would not be subject to the new fee. The proposed rule has a 30-day comment period before going into effect.

== In politics and culture ==
=== 2015 spotlight on H-1B visas ===
In 2015, reports surfaced of major companies like Disney and Southern California Edison replacing American workers with H-1B visa holders, sometimes requiring displaced employees to train their replacements as a condition for severance. The New York Times editorial board criticized the program for exploiting both foreign and domestic workers due to loopholes and weak enforcement.

Following these revelations, ten U.S. senators urged the Department of Labor to investigate outsourcing practices at Southern California Edison, which had laid off 500 employees. After a ten-month review, the department found no legal violations.

The Senate Judiciary Committee held hearings in 2015 and 2016, led by Senators Chuck Grassley and Jeff Sessions, to examine how the H-1B program affected U.S. workers. Witnesses, including labor leaders and economists, testified that companies were not required to prioritize American workers, allowing employers to use the program to import cheaper foreign labor instead of filling skills gaps. Senator Grassley characterized the program as favoring employers over U.S. workers rather than serving its intended purpose.

=== 2016 election policy issue ===
The H-1B visa program was a contentious issue in the 2016 presidential election. Donald Trump pledged to overhaul the system, arguing that it displaced American IT workers and suppressed wages. His campaign proposed raising the prevailing wage for H-1B workers to encourage hiring U.S. citizens and legal immigrants.

Hillary Clinton criticized the program for enabling employers to hire cheaper, more compliant foreign workers but viewed H-1B reform as part of broader immigration-policy changes.

Bernie Sanders opposed guest worker programs and was skeptical of H-1B visas, citing their role in offshoring American jobs. He also rejected open-border policies, emphasizing the need to raise wages and prioritize domestic employment.

=== 2019 H-1B data ===
In 2019, USCIS launched the H-1B Employer Data Hub, providing public access to information on H-1B visa petitions dating back to fiscal year 2009. That same year, the USCIS Office of Policy and Strategy released an updated estimate of H-1B visa holders in the U.S. As of September 30, 2019, 583,420 individuals were authorized to work on an H-1B visa.

USCIS estimated a total of 619,327 approved unique beneficiaries, adjusting for 2,100 visa denials by the State Department and subtracting 32,332 individuals who had obtained lawful permanent residency. An additional 1,475 visa holders had changed to a different non-immigrant status.

=== 2021 electronic registration system ===
In 2021, USCIS launched its first electronic registration system for the H-1B lottery.

== Economic effects ==
Studies have shown H-1B visas can lead to lower wages for competing workers, but that H-1B visas have had welfare-improving effects for Americans, leading to significant overall wage gains, lower consumer prices, greater innovation, and greater total factor productivity growth. A study found H-1B visa holders have been associated with greater innovation and economic performance. A 2022 study in Journal of Political Economy found that firms who received H-1B visas do not necessarily innovate or grow more quickly, nor patent more than firms that do not. Increased cost of the visa has an effect on primary care provision in the US.

== Criticism ==
=== Corporate welfare ===
Critics of the H-1B visa program say it is a government labor-subsidy for corporations. Paul Donnelly, in a 2002 article in Computerworld, cited Milton Friedman as stating the H-1B program acts as a subsidy for corporations. Others holding this view include Norman Matloff, who testified to the U.S. House Judiciary Committee Subcommittee on Immigration on the H-1B subject. Matloff describes four types of labor savings for corporations and employers:

- Type I labor savings is where employers pay H-1Bs less than similarly qualified American workers.
- Type II labor savings are where employers hire younger H-1Bs in lieu of older and more expensive American workers.
- Type III labor savings are where employers force H-1B workers to work longer hours.
- Type IV labor savings are when the oversaturation of H-1B workers suppresses wages in the labor market.

=== No labor shortage ===
Academic researchers have found no labor shortage in STEM, undercutting the primary reason for the H-1B visa's existence. In 2022, Howard University public-policy professor Ron Hira found there was no shortage in STEM due to stagnant wages in IT and a 7% decline in real wages for engineers. In the past, he has called the IT talent shortage "imaginary," and a front for companies that want to hire cheaper, foreign, guest workers.

Studies from Rutgers University professor Hal Salzman, and co-authors B. Lindsay Lowell and Daniel Kuehn, have concluded the U.S. has been employing only 30% to 50% of its newly degreed, able and willing STEM workers to work in STEM fields. Salzman points to simultaneous industry layoffs, when industry claims labor shortage. In his Senate Judiciary testimony, he stated between 2006 and 2016, the IT industry, the predominant user of the H-1B visa, laid off on average 97,000 workers per year, more than the number of 74,000 H-1B workers brought for the IT industry.

A 2012 IEEE announcement of a conference on STEM education funding and job markets stated: "only about half of those with under-graduate STEM degrees actually work in the STEM-related fields after college, and after 10 years, only some 8% still do." Norman Matloff's University of Michigan Journal of Law Reform paper said there has been no shortage of qualified American citizens to fill American computer-related jobs, and that the data offered as evidence of American corporations needing H-1B visas to address labor shortages was erroneous. The United States General Accounting Office (GAO) found in a 2000 report controls on the H-1B program lacked effectiveness. The GAO report's recommendations were subsequently implemented.

High-tech companies often cite a tech-worker shortage when asking Congress to raise the annual cap on H-1B visas, and have succeeded in getting exemptions passed. The American Immigration Lawyers Association (AILA), described the situation as a crisis, and the situation was reported on by Wall Street Journal, BusinessWeek, and Washington Post. Employers applied pressure on Congress. Microsoft chairman Bill Gates testified in 2007 on behalf of the expanded visa program on Capitol Hill: "warning of dangers to the U.S. economy if employers can't import skilled workers to fill job gaps." Congress considered a bill to address the claims of a shortfall but did not revise the program.

According to a study conducted by John Miano and the Center for Immigration Studies, there is no empirical data to support a claim of a worker shortage. Citing studies from Duke University, Alfred P. Sloan Foundation, Georgetown University and others, critics have also argued in some years, the number of foreign programmers and engineers imported outnumbered the number of jobs created by the industry. Hire Americans First has posted hundreds of first-hand accounts of H-1B visa harm reports from individuals who were harmed by the program.

==== Wage depression ====
Critics of the H-1B program often complain about wage depression as a result of an increased supply of discounted guest workers. In the 21st century, labor experts have found guest workers are abundantly available in times of wage decline and weak workforce demand. The Economic Policy Institute found sixty percent of certified H-1B positions were paid below the local median wage. In Washington D.C., companies hiring a level-1 entry-level H-1B software developer received a discount of 36%, or $41,746. For level-II workers, companies received a discount of 18%, or $20,863.

In 2014, The Department of Homeland Security annual report indicates that H-1B workers in computer science are paid a mean salary of $75,000 annually, almost $25,000 below the average annual income for software developers and studies have found H-1B workers are paid significantly less than U.S. workers. Some critics have said the H-1B program is primarily used as a source of cheap labor.

==== Prevailing wage loopholes ====
The Labor Condition Application (LCA) included in the H-1B petition is supposed to ensure H-1B workers are paid the prevailing wage in the labor market or the employer's actual average wage, whichever is higher, but there is evidence some employers get around these provisions and avoid paying the prevailing wage despite stiff penalties for abusers. The LCA process appears to offer protection to both U.S. and H-1B workers but according to the U.S. General Accounting Office, enforcement limitations and procedural problems render these protections ineffective. The employer, not the Department of Labor, determines what sources determine the prevailing wage for an offered position, and it may choose from a variety of competing surveys, including its own wage surveys, provided such surveys follow rules and regulations.

The law restricts the Department of Labor's approval process of LCAs to checking for "completeness and obvious inaccuracies." In FY 2005, only about 800 LCAs of over 300,000 submitted were rejected. Hire American First has posted several hundred first-hand accounts of individuals negatively affected by the program. According to attorney John Miano, the H-1B prevailing wage requirement is "rife" with loopholes.

==== Internal "brain drain" ====
Opponents of the H-1B visa program says wage depression in STEM causes young American college graduates to stop pursuing these fields.

=== Discrimination ===
==== Against U.S. citizens ====
Critics of the H-1B visa program have said it enables Silicon Valley to discriminate against U.S. citizens and permanent residents. In 2021, Facebook settled a claim with the Department of Justice that it discriminated against U.S. workers in favor of temporary visa holders. The company paid a $4.75-million civil penalty and set aside $9.5 million for eligible victims.

==== Ageism ====
Critics of the H-1B visa program say the program enables Silicon Valley to discriminate against older workers.

=== Executive action history ===
Since 2008, USCIS has updated and issued new rules regarding the H-1B visa.

Some workers who come to the U.S. on H-1B visas receive poor, unfair, and illegal treatment by brokers who place them with jobs in the U.S., according to a report published in 2014. The United States Trafficking Victims Protection Reauthorization Act of 2013 was passed to help protect the rights of foreign workers in the U.S., and the U.S. Department of State distributes pamphlets to inform foreign workers of their rights.

Some companies have paid H-1B workers less than they said they would in the H-1B visa application that they had filed. Labor researchers found that NCLTech's underpayments to its H-1B workers totaled $95 million per year. Critics say employers exercise outsized control over H-1B workers because the visa ties workers to their employers. These workers are less likely to complain about poor working conditions for fear of visa revocation and deportation.

=== Dual intent ===
In 2017, President Donald Trump expressed concerns about using the H-1B visa as a pathway to permanent residency and proposed restructuring the immigration system, including introducing a points-based system. In response, some individuals sought alternative routes to permanent residency, such as the EB-5 visa program, which offers a more direct path. Advocacy groups opposing changes to H-1B policies launched public awareness campaigns, including posters in the San Francisco Bay Area’s Rapid Transit system.

=== Body shopping and offshoring ===
Critics of the program criticize American and outsourcing companies for using H-1B visa workers to body shop and offshore work abroad. Researchers have found two thirds of IT jobs are offshorable, and the remaining third remain onshore to be the conduit between American clients and offshore work teams.

The leading users of H-1B visas are Indian outsourcing firms. In 2021, half of the top-thirty employers of H-1B visa holders were outsourcing firms. The top-10 H-1B employers in 2014 such as Tata Consultancy, Cognizant, Infosys, Wipro, Accenture, HCL America, and IBM all used the program to ship jobs offshore. Critics of H-1B use for outsourcing have also noted more H-1B visas are granted to companies headquartered in India than to companies headquartered in the United States. Although these IT outsourcing companies have a physical presence in the U.S., they hire temporary foreign guest workers.

Senator Dick Durbin stated in a speech on H-1B visa reform:

The H-1B job visa lasts for three years and can be renewed for three years. What happens to those workers after that? Well, they could stay. It is possible. But these new companies have a much better idea for making money. They send the engineers to America to fill spots—and get money to do it—and then after the three to six years, they bring them back to work for the companies that are competing with American companies. They call it their outsourcing visa. They are sending their talented engineers to learn how Americans do business and then bring them back and compete with those American companies.

Of all computer systems analysts and programmers on H-1B visas in the U.S., 74 percent were from Asia.

Large migration of Asian IT professionals to the U.S. has been a central component to the emergence of the offshore outsourcing industry. In FY 2009, due to the worldwide recession, applications for H-1B visas by offshore outsourcing firms were significantly lower than in previous years, yet 110,367 H-1B visas were issued, and 117,409 were issued in FY2010. Computerworld and The New York Times have reported on the inordinate share of H-1B visas received by firms that specialize in offshore outsourcing, the subsequent inability of employers to hire foreign professionals with legitimate technical and language skill combinations, and the replacement of American professionals already performing their job functions and being coerced to train their foreign replacements.

==== Training foreign replacements ====
There have been cases where employers used the program to replace their American employees with H-1B employees; in some cases, the laid-off employees were ordered to train their replacements. In 2013, Northeast Utilities laid off 350 tech workers, many of whom trained their replacements who were hired on H-1B visas to do their jobs. In October 2014, Walt Disney World laid off 250 IT workers, some of whose final assigned task for the company was to train their replacements who'd been hired on H-1B visas. Southern California Edison laid off 540 tech workers in 2014, requiring many to train their replacements who'd been hired on H-1B visas. Fossil laid off 100 tech workers and hired 25 on H-1B visas who were then trained by the laid-off employees in what Fossil termed "knowledge sharing." Researchers have found during the 2022 tech layoffs, companies laid off their U.S. workforce while continuing to bring in more H-1B workers. The top-30 H-1B employers in 2022 laid off at least 85,000 workers, while bringing in 34,000 H-1B workers.

=== Limitations for entrepreneurs and self-employed consultants ===
Entrepreneurs do not qualify for the H-1B visa. The United States immigration system's EB-5 visa program does permit foreign entrepreneurs to apply for a green card if they make a sufficient investment in a commercial enterprise and intend to create 10 or more jobs in the United States. In 2014, the University of Massachusetts began a program allowing entrepreneurs to found U.S. companies while fulfilling visa requirements by teaching and mentoring on campus, with the university as sponsoring employer. Self-employed consultants have no visa that allows them to enter the country and perform work independently for unspecified, extended periods. A B-1 visa would permit temporary travel to the U.S. to consult for specific periods. Consulting companies have been formed for the sole purpose of sponsoring employees on H-1B visas to allow them to perform work for clients, with the company sharing the resulting profit.

=== Fraud ===
According to the USCIS's H-1B Benefit Fraud & Compliance Assessment of September 2008, 21% of H-1B visas granted originate from applications that were fraudulent or had technical violations. Fraud was defined as a willful misrepresentation, falsification, or omission of a material fact. Technical violations, errors, omissions, and failures to comply that are not within the fraud definition were included in the 21% rate.

USCIS, H-1B Benefit Fraud and Compliance Assessment (2008)
Beneficiary Education Level	Violation Rate	% of Sample	Total Cases
Bachelor's Degree	31%	43%	106
Graduate Degree	13%	57%	140

USCIS, H-1B Benefit Fraud & Compliance Assessment (2008)
Reported Occupations	Violation Rate	% of Sample	Total Cases
Architecture, Engineering, and Surveying	8%	15%	36
Mathematics and Physical Sciences	0%	1%	3
Computer Professionals	27%	42%	104
Life Sciences	0%	4%	11
Social Sciences	0%	<1%	1
Medicine and Health	10%	4%	10
Education	9%	13%	33
Law	0%	<1%	1
Writing	0%	<1%	1
Art	29%	3%	7
Accounting, Human Resources, Sales, Advertising, and Business Analysts	42%	11%	26
Managerial	33%	4%	9
Miscellaneous Professions	0%	2%	4

In 2009, federal authorities arrested people for a nationwide H-1B visa scam in which the perpetrators allegedly submitted false statements and documents in connection with petitions for H-1B visas. Fraud has included acquisition of a fake university degree for the prospective H-1B worker, coaching the worker to lie to consul officials, hiring a worker for which there is no U.S. job, charging the worker money to be hired, benching the worker with no pay, and taking a cut of the worker's U.S. salary. The workers, who have little choice in the matter, are also engaged in fraud and may be charged, fined, and deported.

Outsourcing companies game the lottery system by filing as many electronic lottery applications as possible for $10 each for jobs that do not exist. In 2023, there were 781,000 lottery entries for 85,000 visas. This was partly the result of different companies submitting the same applicant multiple times. USCIS said there is a high prevalence of fraud with the new electronic registration system.

== H-1B visa tables and charts ==
H-1B issued years 2006–2008

Issued by continent 2005

Issued by nation in 2023

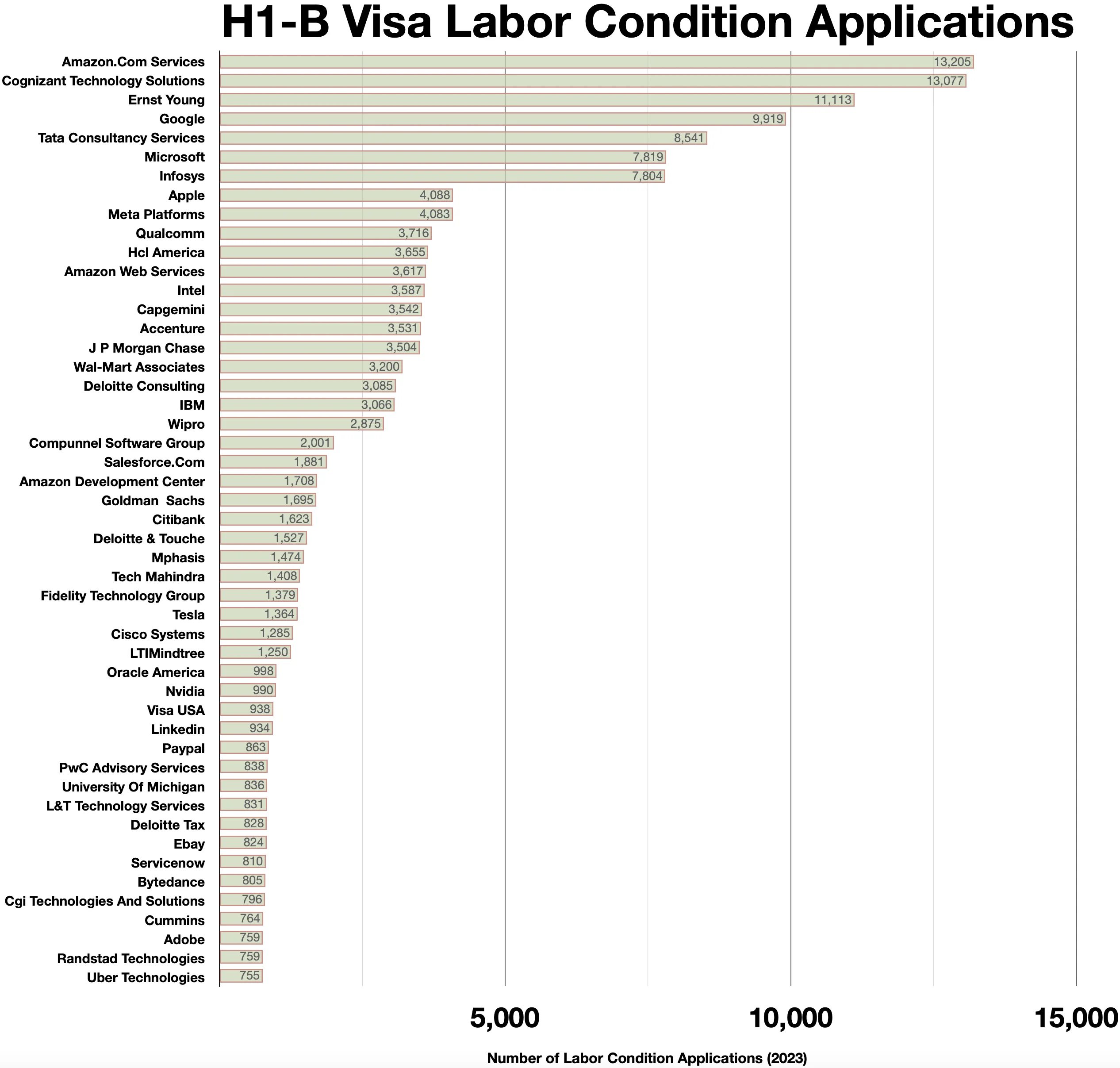
H1-B Visa Labor Condition Applications (2023) by employer

=== Approved H-1B applications ===
H-1B Applications Approved by Fiscal Year
Fiscal Year	Initial employment approvals	Continuing employment approvals	Total
2000	136,787	120,853	257,640
2001	201,079	130,127	331,206
2002	103,584	93,953	197,537
2003	105,314	112,026	217,340
2004	130,497	156,921	287,418
2005	116,927	150,204	267,131
2006	109,614	161,367	270,981
2007	120,031	161,413	281,444
2008	109,335	166,917	276,252
2009	86,300	127,971	214,271
2010	76,627	116,363	192,990
2011	106,445	163,208	269,653
2012	136,890	125,679	262,569
2013	128,291	158,482	286,773
2014	124,326	191,531	315,857
2015	113,605	161,714	275,317
2016	114,504	230,759	345,262
2017	108,101	257,581	365,682
2018	93,615	238,743	332,358
2019	138,297	249,476	388,403
2020	122,886	303,824	426,710
2021	123,414	283,657	407,071
2022	132,429	309,614	442,043
2023	118,948	267,370	386,318

H-1B Applications Approved by Education or Equivalent
Fiscal Year	No High School Diploma	Only High School Diploma	Less Than 1 year of College	1+ years of College	Equivalent of Associate's	Total Less Than Bachelor's Degree	Bachelor's Degree or Higher
2000	554	288	158	1,290	696	2,986	130,304
2001	247	895	284	1,376	1,181	3,983	157,660
2002	169	806	189	849	642	2,655	115,697
2003	148	822	122	623	534	2,249	104,947
2004	123	690	137	421	432	1,803	137,162
2005	107	440	77	358	363	1,345	122,754
2006	96	392	54	195	177	914	134,507
2007	72	374	42	210	215	913	153,140
2008	80	174	19	175	195	643	128,821
2009	108	190	33	236	262	829	109,538
2010	140	201	24	213	161	739	116,670
2011	373	500	44	255	170	1,342	127,792
2012	108	220	35	259	174	796	134,734
2013	68	148	15	162	121	514	152,709
2014	32	133	18	133	88	404	160,965
2015	52	148	25	232	189	646	172,102
2016	53	128	28	220	209	638	179,419
2017	30	107	17	173	171	498	178,551
2018	18	90	9	127	127	371	321,182
2019	23	80	10	132	113	358	375,283
2020						329	413,401
2021						289	395,126
2022						315	311,395
2023						293	247,530

=== H-1B visas issued per year ===
New and initial H-1B and H-1B1 visas issued by the U.S. Department of State through consular offices
Fiscal Year	H-1B	H-1B1	Total
1990	794	n/a	794
1991	51,882	n/a	51,882
1992	44,290	n/a	44,290
1993	35,818	n/a	35,818
1994	42,843	n/a	42,843
1995	51,832	n/a	51,832
1996	58,327	n/a	58,327
1997	80,547	n/a	80,547
1998	91,360	n/a	91,360
1999	116,513	n/a	116,513
2000	133,290	n/a	133,290
2001	161,643	n/a	161,643
2002	118,352	n/a	118,352
2003	107,196	n/a	107,196
2004	138,965	72	139,037
2005	124,099	275	124,374
2006	135,421	440	135,861
2007	154,053	639	154,692
2008	129,464	719	130,183
2009	110,367	621	110,988
2010	117,409	419	117,828
2011	129,134	418	129,552
2012	135,530	461	135,991
2013	153,223	571	153,794
2014	161,369	870	162,239
2015	172,748	1,051	173,799
2016	180,057	1,294	181,351
2017	179,049	1,391	180,440
2018	179,660	1,498	181,158
2019	188,123	1,724	189,847
2020	124,983	1,083	126,066
2021	61,569	1,586	63,155
2022	206,002	2,376	208,378

=== Top H-1B employers by visa approval ===
Companies receiving H-1Bs
Company	Headquartered (City)	Headquartered (Country)	2006	2007	2008	2009	2010	2011	2012	2013	2014	2015	2016	2017
Cognizant	Teaneck	United States	2,226	962	467	233	3,388	4,222	9,281	9,986	5,228	15,680	21,459	28,908
Tata Consultancy Services	Mumbai	India	3,046	797	1,539			1,740	7,469	6,258	7,149	6,339	11,295	14,697
Infosys	Bengaluru	India	4,900	4,559	4,559	440	3,792	3,962	5,600	6,298	4,022	8,991	12,780	13,408
Wipro	Bengaluru	India	4,002	2,567	2,678	1,964	1,521	2,736	4,304	2,644	3,246	4,803	6,819	6,529
Deloitte	New York City	United States	1,555	525	413	563	196	559	1,668	1,491		559	3,114	6,027
Accenture	Dublin	Ireland	637	331	731	287	506	1,347	4,037	3,346	2,376	5,793	6,831	5,070
Tech Mahindra	Pune	India	2,880	1,396	1,917	219	224		1,963	1,589	1,850	2,657	3,344	4,931
Amazon	Seattle	United States	262	81		182				881	877		2,739	4,767
HCLTech	Noida	India	910	102				1,033	2,070	1,766	927	2,776	3,492	4,392
Microsoft	Redmond	United States	3,117	959	1,037	1,318	1,618	947	1,497	1,048	850		3,556	4,069
Capgemini	Paris	France	309	99						699	536		3,276	3,580
IBM	Armonk	United States	1,324	199	381	865	882	853	1,846	1,624	1,513	2,500	3,569	3,000
Ernst & Young	London	United Kingdom	774	302	321	481				373			1,552	2,986
Google	Mountain View	United States	328	248	207	211	172	383		753	728		2,517	2,758
Intel	Santa Clara	United States	828	369	351	723				772	700		1,873	2,625
Syntel, Inc.	Troy	United States	416	130		129			1,161	1,149	1,080		2,286	2,119
Apple Inc.	Cupertino	United States									443		1,992	2,055
LTIMindtree	Mumbai	India	947	292	403	602	333	1,204	1,832	1,001	1,298		2,701	1,864
Cisco	San Jose	United States	828	324	422	308				379	246		1,529	1,587
Facebook	Menlo Park	United States											1,107	1,566
IGATE (merged with Patni Computer Systems)	Bridgewater and Bengaluru	United StatesIndia	1,391	477	296	609	164		1,260	1,157	886			
Qualcomm	San Diego	United States	533	158	255	320				909	218		1,143	
Mphasis	Bengaluru	India	751	248	251	229	197			556	405			
Oracle Corporation	Redwood Shores	United States	1,022	113	168	272				475	365		1,448	
UST	Aliso Viejo	United States	339	416		344				475	421		1,136	
PwC	London	United Kingdom	591	192						449	138			
Computer Sciences Corporation	Falls Church	United States									873			
Mindtree	Bengaluru	India									487		1,103	

Top 10 H-1B Receiving Universities
School	H-1Bs Received 2006
New York City Public Schools	642
University of Michigan	437
University of Illinois Chicago	434
University of Pennsylvania	432
Johns Hopkins School of Medicine	432
University of Maryland	404
Columbia University	355
Yale University	316
Harvard University	308
Stanford University	279
Washington University in St. Louis	278
University of Pittsburgh	275

Top 10 Employers for H-1B Visas (LCA filed)
Company name	Fiscal Year 2018
Ernst & Young	140,766
Cognizant	38,205
Deloitte	31,988
HCLTech	23,812
Apple Inc.	20,168
Qualcomm	15,612
Tata Consultancy Services	15,581
Amazon Fulfillment Services	11,644
Kforce	10,553
Mphasis	10,403

== See also ==
- Deportation of Rasha Alawieh
- E-3 visa
- H-1B1 visa
- H-4 visa
- TN status
