= H-1B Visa Reform Act of 2004 =

Legislation of the United States

The H-1B Visa Reform Act of 2004 was a part of Title IV of the Consolidated Appropriations Act, 2005 (sometimes also called the Omnibus Appropriations Act of 2005) in the United States that focused on changes to regulations governing H-1B visas. It was a successor to previous legislative changes affecting the H-1B, namely: the Immigration Act of 1990, American Competitiveness and Workforce Improvement Act (ACWIA) of 1998, and the American Competitiveness in the 21st Century Act (AC21) of 2000. The Consolidated Appropriations Act was signed by George W. Bush, then President of the United States, in early December 2004.

Title IV of the Consolidated Appropriations Act had another component pertaining to immigration regulations, namely the L-1 Visa Reform Act of 2004, that pertained to L-1 visas.

== Provisions ==
=== Addition of some cap-exempt slots for people with graduate degrees ===
Prior to this Act, there were 195,000 slots available under the annual H-1B cap. Nonprofit research institutions were exempt from the cap, and people who had been counted towards the cap already (such as if they were transferring jobs or extending a 3-year H-1B by another 3 years) could apply without being counted against the cap as long as they weren't going over their 6-year limit.

The H-1B Visa Reform Act of 2004 effectively reduced the cap from 195,000 to 65,000 visas, but declaring exemptions for the first 20,000 applicants each year with graduate degrees. Specifically:

- The first 20,000 H-1B beneficiaries who have earned a master's degree or higher from a U.S. institution of higher education are not subject to the annual congressionally mandated H-1B visa cap of 65,000. After those 20,000 slots are filled, USCIS is required to count thosecases against the cap for the remainder of the fiscal year.
- This would begin starting FY 2005 (October 1, 2004 - September 30, 2005) and applications for this could be submitted starting March 8, 2005. For FY 2006, this would apply right from the beginning of applications opening up (i.e., the first week of April 2005).
- Nonimmigrants currently in the United States on a J-1 (exchange) visa who receive a waiver of the two-year residency requirement if requested by either a federal or state agency are now exempt from the H-1B cap. Qualifying employers of these beneficiaries may submit H-1B petitions, notwithstanding the fact that the H-1B cap was already met for FY 2005, after December 8, 2004.

=== Changes to fee structure ===
The fee structure was changed as follows:

- There was no change to the rules governing the base filing fee, that had to be included with all applications (this fee would increase periodically due to inflation—as of 2015, the fee stands at $325).
- The structure of the additional fee introduced by the American Competitiveness and Workforce Improvement Act (ACWIA) and modified by the American Competitiveness in the 21st Century Act (AC21) was changed from its original value ($500 at the time of the creation of the fee by the ACWIA, and $1000 after the passage of AC21) to the following payment structure:
  - Companies employing 26 or more full-time employees were required to pay a fee of $1500.
  - Companies employing 25 or fewer full-time employees were required to pay a fee of $750.
  - Nonprofit research institutions applying for the uncapped H-1B continued to be exempt from this fee (this clause was present in ACWIA and AC21).
  - The allocation of the money raised between various US agencies and programs was also changed.
- An additional anti-fraud fee of $500 was also instituted, applicable to all except those applying for a three-year extension of an existing H-1B status.
- Employers could optionally pay a $1000 fee for premium processing, so that they could get to know quickly if the application was approved.

=== Renewal of LCA attestation requirements and expansion of DOL investigative authority ===
The Labor Condition Application (LCA) attestations that were introduced for H-1B-dependent employers and those who had committed willful misrepresentations recently were renewed. These attestations continue to be required as of 2015.

=== Elimination of the "95% rule" for the prevailing wage requirement ===
The "95% rule" for prevailing wages, where employers needed to pay only 95% or more of the prevailing wage, was eliminated: employers were now required to pay at least 100% of the prevailing wage.

=== Changes to Department of Labor investigative authority ===
The DOL was given authority to investigate when the Secretary of Labor personally certifies that there is reasonable cause to believe that the employer is not in compliance and authorizes the investigation, or when a credible source provides information that includes allegations that within the past 12 months an employer has willfully failed to meet an LCA condition, has engaged in a pattern or practice of violations, or has committed a substantial failure to meet an LCA condition that affects multiple employees.

=== Formal lines of defense for employers ===
Employers were given two recognized, standard lines of defense they could use in case of any investigation or identification of problems with their applications:

- Good Faith Compliance Defense: H-1B employers are considered to have complied in good faith with the program requirements notwithstanding a "technical or procedural failure" to meet such requirements, if the employer:
  1. Made a good faith attempt to comply;
  2. Voluntarily corrected the failure within 10 business days of having it explained by the DOL or another enforcement agency; and
  3. Has not engaged in a pattern or practice of willful violations.
- Recognized Industry Standards Defense: H-1B employers that have established that the prevailing wage used was calculated consistent with recognized industry standards and practices will not be assessed fines or penalties for prevailing wage violations.

== See also ==
- Immigration Innovation Act of 2015
