= Employ American Workers Act =

The Employ American Workers Act (EAWA) was a component of the American Recovery and Reinvestment Act of 2009 (ARRA, commonly called the "stimulus bill") passed by the 111th United States Congress and signed into law by Barack Obama, then President of the United States, on February 17, 2009. The Act had a validity period of two years and was set to expire on February 17, 2011. It was not renewed, hence it sunset on February 17, 2011 and is no longer applicable.

== Provisions ==
EAWA affected only those companies that had received funds from one of these:

- The Troubled Asset Relief Program (TARP) that had been signed into law by George W. Bush, the previous President of the United States, on October 3, 2008
- Section 13 of the Federal Reserve Act

EAWA imposed the requirement that all such companies would be classified as H-1B-dependent employers for their Labor Condition Applications, with the following caveats:

- Whereas employers were exempt from the H-1B-dependency requirements when hiring for a position with an annual salary of more than $60,000 or a worker with a graduate degree, this exemption did not apply for the companies to which EAWA applied.
- The rule applied to all companies where the employee had not yet started a job on H-1B. This included companies that had already received approvals on their Labor Condition Application. Such companies were only required to submit the additional information needed for the conditions of the EAWA rather than resubmit the whole LCA.
- The rule did not apply to workers seeking to extend their H-1B stay.
- Once a company had repaid all its Section 13 and TARP funding, it was no longer bound by these constraints and returned to being treated like other companies.

Form I-129 was modified by the USCIS to include an additional sheet asking questions about receipt of TARP and Section 13 funding and repayment of the funds.

The United States Department of the Treasury clarified that, if the Treasury merely holds warrants in an entity (such as through the Capital Purchase Program) that does not make the entity subject to EAWA.

The concept of H-1B-dependent workers, originally introduced in the American Competitiveness and Workforce Improvement Act of 1998, was intended to apply to companies for which a substantial portion of the workforce used the H-1B. Its extension to companies that may not otherwise have a large H-1B workforce was due to concerns that government funds given to banks be used to tackle problems of unemployment and depression in the United States, rather than fund the livelihoods of foreigners.

== Reception ==
EAWA received sharp criticism from immigration lawyers and economists who alleged that the law was an act of economically irresponsible protectionism, and that it starved companies of talented workers precisely when they needed those workers the most. An article in The Wall Street Journal noted that many students who had received confirmed job offers from financial institutions found their employers reneging on the offers due to the new restrictions.

An article in EWeek noted that these restrictions on TARP and Section 13 recipients, most of them banks and other financial institutions, would likely make it easier for workers at technology companies to get H-1B visas, given the limited number of visas allotted every year and the fierce competition for those slots.
