= Body shopping =

Practice of consultancy firms recruiting workers

Body shopping is the practice of consultancy firms recruiting workers (generally in the information technology sector) to contract their services out on a tactical short- to mid-term basis. IT services companies that practice body shopping assert that they provide real services (such as software development) rather than the "sham" of merely farming out professionals to overseas companies.

== History and origin ==
Body shopping in IT originated during the mid-1990s when there was a huge demand for people with mainframe, COBOL and related technology skills to prevent systems being affected by the Y2K bug.

Most specialist Y2K consulting companies operating in the US, Europe, the Middle East, Japan and Australia outsourced their technical manpower requirements to companies operating in India.

During 1996–97, such companies based in India responded to the heavy demand by recruiting and training local Indian graduates specifically for Y2K. Their consultants either worked onshore or offshore at high use rates, generating huge profit margins and cash reserves. The high profit margin during this period resulted in fast growth and sufficient assets to invest and expand operations to other IT related business segments after Y2K.

=== Modern era ===
In the modern era of IT off-shoring, outsourcing, and cloud computing, it is widely accepted that IT service companies' strategy (especially for those operating with a huge technical manpower base in India) still continue to focus on similar lines. The companies that do body shopping are renowned for training and developing technical skills for a wide range of client base that is of current demand. Researchers point out that many Indian companies focus heavily on developing a large pool of human resources with technical skills creating a marketplace to 'buy' technical skills on an hourly or daily basis.

This led to significant market developments in two areas in the early 2000s:

1. Fierce competition amongst IT service companies from India competing on a global level to win 'time and material and labor tenders' from multinational giants for their IT needs. Such a strategy, though heavily linked to procurement needs of the end-customer, enables IT companies operating from offshore (in particular India) to forecast demand for technical and managerial competencies based on IT-skills-market trends to position themselves competitively.
2. Technology and consulting companies operating mainly in western markets during the 1990s (e.g. Accenture, IBM, Hewlett-Packard) were forced to open offices in southeast Asia and move their manpower base there to compete with traditional manpower providers operated from India (e.g. Infosys, Wipro, Tata Consultancy Services) on large global-level IT bids.

According to a U.S. Citizenship and Immigration Services report to Congress, for fiscal year 2012, 59 percent of H-1B visas went to computer-related occupations. The same report also cited that 64 percent of the H-1B visa petitions granted were given to workers originating from India.

== Revenue model ==
Body shopping companies mainly recruit off-shore and provide training to their employees using their off-shore facilities.

Employment costs (both short-term and permanent) are generally offset by the highly profitable billing ratio, especially for on-site assignments abroad. Most companies boast a use rate of 80%, which also takes into account the potentially long 'bench period', where an employee is not billable or when their skills are not in demand.

== Indian body shopping networks ==
In India, traditional body shopping has evolved in its due course post-Y2K era to create strong networking and collaboration between competing Indian body shops working abroad. All body shops claim to have the ability to place Indian workers in almost any country using the resources and services of other Indian body shops operating in the target country.

In one documented case study deemed as a typical example, a body shop in Hyderabad was able to win a 360 man-month deal with a U.S. company that urgently needed 40 IT workers with a very "specific" skill on a 9-month project. Although the Indian body shop company could easily find lower paid workers in India for the job, the H-1B visa process would take too long to bring them into the United States to work. Thus, the Indian firm forwarded a request to its associates' network to locate 40 Indian temporary workers in the United States. A search was undertaken by the network for available Indian H-1B workers, resulting in a list of recently laid-off Indian H-1B workers in the US. Sponsorship for the laid-off Indian H-1B workers was reassigned to a body shop and a portion of the newly employed worker's salary was given as commission to the peer body shop that helped to locate the laid off H-1B workers in their associated peer network of Indian body shops. This process of quickly recruiting available H-1B holders is what is referred to as "body shopping".

== Offshoring and nearshoring ==
A similar "offshoring" practice started appearing more and more in the 2010 timeframe and which was a practice known as "nearshoring". Nearshoring was the practice of hiring mostly IT professionals from Mexico. The outward appearance was the advantage of "nearshoring" personnel being within a 2-hour or less time difference to continental U.S. companies opting to use these nearshoring services.

== See also ==
- L-1 Visa
- Sweatshop
