= H-1B1 visa =

H1-B visa variant issued to citizens of Singapore and Chile

The H-1B1 visa (and associated H-1B1 status) is a variant of the H-1B visa in the United States for nationals of Singapore and Chile. The version for Singapore is called the H-1B1-Singapore and the version for Chile is called the H-1B1-Chile. These categories were introduced with the Singapore–United States Free Trade Agreement and Chile–United States Free Trade Agreement respectively, both of which were ratified in 2003 by the 108th United States Congress (and signed into law by then president George W. Bush) and became active on January 1, 2004. The visas are also called FTA visas because they were provided for through Free Trade Agreements (FTAs).

H-1B1 is distinct from the E-3 visa for Australian nationals, even though both are variants of the H-1B. It is also distinct from the TN visa and associated status for residents of Canada and Mexico, which is associated with the North American Free Trade Agreement (NAFTA).

== Relation with the H-1B program ==
Of the 65,000 visas allocated to the capped H-1B visa program, the amount of 6,800 are reserved for use for the H-1B1: 1,400 for Chile and 5,400 for Singapore. All approved applications for H-1B1 classification, including those that involve issuance of a visa and those that involve a change of status, are counted towards these limits.

Unused slots in the H-1B1 program in a given fiscal year get added to the general H-1B quota for the next fiscal year.

Nationals of Chile and Singapore can still avail of the usual H-1B visa. This might be advantageous for some of them because the H-1B program places fewer restrictions along some dimensions.

== Program details and differences with the usual H-1B program requirements ==
=== Two ways of obtaining H-1B1 classification ===
There are two different ways a person can obtain H-1B1 status necessary to start a job on H-1B1:

- The worker can apply for a H-1B1 visa at the home country consulate (nationals of Singapore can apply for a H-1B1 visa only at the U.S. Embassy in Singapore, and nationals of Chile can apply for a H-1B1 visa only at the U.S. Embassy in Chile).
- If already in the United States on another status, the employer can file a Form I-129 (Petition for a Nonimmigrant Worker) on the worker's behalf.

When the visa application or Form I-129 petition is approved, the worker can legally begin working on the H-1B1 classification on or after the indicated start date. Even for I-129 applicants, however, once the worker leaves the US to travel abroad, he/she must return home (Singapore or Chile) to a U.S. consulate for a new H-class visa stamp to re-enter the US. Please note that acquiring this visa stamp would require the worker to prove non-immigrant intent, without which his/her application may be denied, and he/she may not be able to return to the U.S.

=== Labor Condition Application ===
As is the case with the H-1B visa and E-3 visa, the employer needs to have a Labor Condition Application (LCA) approved by the United States Department of Labor in order for the employee to be eligible for the H-1B1 status or visa. The LCA form is the same as for the H-1B visa, but needs to be annotated "H-1B1-Singapore" or "H-1B1-Chile" as the case may be. An employer may use a single LCA for multiple applicants as long as they all fall within the same category (i.e., they must all be in a single one of the categories: H-1B, H-1B1-Singapore, H-1B1-Chile, E-3).

An approved LCA is a prerequisite for applying for H-1B1 classification (whether in the form of a H-1B1 visa or in the form of Form I-129 for change of status).

== Eligibility criteria ==
=== Definition of specialty occupation ===
The concept of specialty occupation used for the H-1B1 status is somewhat broader than that used for the H-1B. Specifically, although the normal minimum requirement for an H-1B is a specialized bachelor's degree, the trade agreements with Chile and Singapore permit alternative credentials in certain professions:

- Agricultural managers and physical therapists (for Chilean workers)
- Management consultants and disaster relief claims adjusters (for Chilean or Singaporean workers).

=== Employer-employee relationship ===
As with the H-1B visa, it is necessary that there be a clear employer-employee relationship between the petitioning employer and the applicant. In particular, the H-1B1 visa applicant cannot be self-employed or an independent contractor.

=== Non-immigrant intent ===
The H-1B visa is a dual intent visa, i.e., people who arrive on this visa may have partial immigrant intent. On the other hand, the H-1B1 visa is not given dual intent, and applicants for the visa must clearly demonstrate such intent by demonstrating the following three things:

1. has a residence abroad,
2. has no immediate intention of abandoning that residence, and
3. intends to depart the U.S. upon the termination of the visa.

However, an intent to immigrate in the future, which is in no way connected to the proposed immediate trip, is not in itself grounds to deny the alien an H-1B1.

Note that, as with most non-immigrant statuses, the burden of demonstrating non-immigrant intent falls only at the time of visa application. Those who achieve the H-1B1 classification through a change of status via Form I-129 do not need to demonstrate non-immigrant intent - until they travel outside the U.S., after which they must return to their home country and apply for a H-class visa to re-enter the U.S.

=== Renewable one-year admission ===
Admission on a H-1B1 visa is for 18 months, but the status can be renewed in yearly increments. Unlike the H-1B visa, there is no six-year limit. However, the associated Labor Condition Application is valid for only three years (initial) or two years (renewals), so after expiry, a new LCA must be filed and used to support the petition.

=== Visa for spouses ===
The spouses of H-1B1 status holders are eligible for the H-4 visa and associated status, same as for the spouses of H-1B status holders.

== Differences with H-1B program ==
Criterion	H-1B	H-1B1
Eligible nationalities	All non-US	Only Singapore Chile
Relation with caps	Counted against the general annual cap of 65,000 (minus visas reserved for Chile and Singapore) for the fiscal year, with some exceptions (20,000 applications for master's degrees per fiscal year, and cap exemption for people who have been counted toward the cap already and those working for a nonprofit research institution).	Separate cap of 1,400 for Chile and 5,400 for Singapore. Unused H-1B1s for the previous year are added to a given fiscal year's cap.
Role of Form I-129 (Petition for a Nonimmigrant Worker)	All H-1B classifications require the employer to file this form	Only applications for change of status, extension of status, or change of employer (applicable to people already present in the United States) need this Form.
Duration	3 years, can be extended by another 3 years. After the completion of 6 years, cannot renew the H-1B status and must leave the US for at least a year before starting the next H-1B (unless an application for a permanent immigration status is pending).	Indefinitely renewable 1-year increments
Definition of specialty occupation	Narrow list of specialty occupations, all of which require a bachelor's degree or equivalent work experience.	In addition to all the specialty occupations eligible for H-1B, allows agricultural managers and physical therapists (Chile only) and management consultants and disaster relief claim adjusters (Both Chile and Singapore).
Non-immigrant intent	The H-1B is a dual intent status, i.e., applicants may have intent to immigrate to the United States.	H-1B1 visa applicants must clearly demonstrate non-immigrant intent, and may not apply for a Green Card while on the H-1B1.
Portability rule (AC21)	Applicants on H-1B can start a job with a new employer as long as they have submitted a Form I-129, even before the form is approved.	Applicants can start work with an employer only after their H-1B1 classification is approved, even if they are switching jobs.
Premium Processing	The H-1B is eligible for Premium Processing. Either the employer or the employee can pay the required $2,500 to expedite the application. USCIS guarantees a response within 15 calendar days, or the $2,500 will be refunded (and the case will continue to receive premium treatment.)	Although the H-1B1 transfer of status processed in the same pool as other H1B I-129 change-of-status or extension of stay applications, it is ineligible for Premium Processing.
Cap-Gap Extension	The H-1B is eligible for Cap Gap Extension, which allows students who are on OPT or in their 60-day grace period as of April 1 - and have a pending/approved October 1 H-1B petition - to continue working (if OPT unexpired before April 1) or stay in the US (if OPT expired before April 1 but still within 60 day grace period) during the "gap."	The H-1B1 is not eligible for the Cap Gap Extension. If a student's OPT ends, he/she must stop work immediately, and only resume employment when the H-1B1 petition has been approved.
Start Date	The H-1B application opens every April 1, 6 months before the official start date on October 1. Unless under Cap-Gap, applicants who are accepted in the lottery may not start working until October 1, and may not travel to the U.S. on H status until 10 days before their start date (if abroad).	H-1B1 applicants can travel to the U.S. and start working as soon as their petitions (I-129 or consular processing) are approved.
Fees	The employer assumes most of the following fees for the H-1B: $460 I-129 Base Filing Fee; $1500 American Competitiveness and Workforce Improvement Act Fee (for non-exempt employers with 26 or more full-time equivalent employees)/$750 (for non-exempt employers with 1-25 employees); $500 fraud prevention and detection fee; $4000 Pub. L. 114-113 fee (for employers with >=50 employees in the US and more than 50% of those are in H-1B or L1 status); $2,500 Premium Processing Fee (can be paid by either employer or employee)	For the H-1B1: If applying for H-1B1 change of status (form I-129 via USCIS), the fees are the same as the H-1B's, except an exempt $500 fraud prevention and detection fee. Also, Premium Processing is unavailable; If applying through Consular Processing, the employee only pays $190 as part of the DS-160 Non-Immigrant Visa application processing fee

== Usage of the program ==
Below, the number of approved H-1B visa and H-1B1 visa applications from Singapore, Chile, and globally are listed. The H-1B1 classification became active on January 1, 2004, and the first H-1B1 visa approvals happened in Fiscal Year 2004. Note that these are visa approvals, not the total number of classifications made. This would cause a slight lag in the statistics, because people from Singapore and Chile who were already in H-1B status would continue to apply for H-1B visas when their original visas expired, rather than switch to H-1B1 status (even if they'd have chosen the latter had the option been present originally). However, even as late as Fiscal Years 2011-2013 (by which time most H-1B visa approvals would correspond to classifications made after the introduction of the H-1B1):

- The total number of H-1B visa approvals from Singapore and Chile was roughly comparable to the total number of H-1B1 visa approvals.
- In absolute numbers, the sum of H-1B and H-1B1 visa approvals had gone up by about 30% relative to the number of H-1B visa approvals before the introduction of the H-1B1.

Fiscal Year	H-1B approvals (global)	H-1B approvals (Singapore)	H-1B approvals (Chile)	H-1B1 approvals (global)	H-1B1 approvals (Singapore)	H-1B1 approvals (Chile)
1997	80547	358	149	0	0	0
1998	91360	371	148	0	0	0
1999	116513	547	156	0	0	0
2000	133290	600	203	0	0	0
2001	161643	722	278	0	0	0
2002	118352	597	308	0	0	0
2003	107196	513	259	0	0	0
2004	138965	600	333	72	46	26
2005	124099	561	278	275	199	76
2006	135421	599	262	440	286	154
2007	154053	532	269	639	416	223
2008	129464	473	204	719	411	308
2009	110367	380	204	621	302	319
2010	117409	483	255	419	168	251
2011	129134	394	199	418	171	247
2012	135530	375	209	461	212	249
2013	153223	330	187	571	261	310
2014	161369	348	156	870	472	398
2015	172748	333	164	1051	551	500
2016	180057	330	136	1294	685	609
2017	179049	369	137	1391	759	632
2018	179660	337	174	1498	808	690
2019	188123	388	186	1724	879	845
2020	124983	254	98	1083	537	546
2021	61569	131	87	1586	489	1097
2022	206002	510	280	2376	927	1449
2023	265777	484	418	3039	944	2095
2024	219659	488	477	3070	939	2131
