= American Competitiveness in the 21st Century Act =

2000 federal immigration legislation

The American Competitiveness in the 21st Century Act (AC21) was an act passed by the United States Congress in October 2000, pertaining to immigration to the United States. It was a complement to the American Competitiveness and Workforce Improvement Act that had been passed in 1998. The focus of AC21 was to change rules related to portability and caps for the H-1B visa to increase the effective number of visas available and make it easier for workers on those visas to switch jobs. Although the language of the Act references the Immigration and Naturalization Service (INS), the INS would soon be restructured and the functions of the INS referenced in AC21 would be handled by United States Citizenship and Immigration Services.

== History ==
A first version of the Act was passed by the United States Senate on January 24, 2000. Amendments were reported on February 9 and April 11 of the same year. The bill became law upon being signed by Bill Clinton, the President of the United States at the time, on October 17, 2000.

The USCIS has issued memoranda and guidance regarding provisions in AC21 that have helped clarify the provisions and how these will be enforced, in 2001, 2003, 2005, and 2008.

== Provisions ==
In summary, the provisions of AC21 did the following:

- They helped increase the efficiency of utilization both of the H-1B status for temporary skilled workers (i.e., "non-immigrant workers") acquired by filing Form I-129, as well as the employment-based immigrant categories for immigration (EB-1, EB-2, and EB-3, acquired through Form I-140), thereby increasing the number of people who at a given time could be in that status. Methods to do this included making unused slots or revoked petitions return to the pool, making transfers from one job to another possible without having them count towards the numerical limits, and exempting research institutions from the numerical caps on H-1B visas.
- They recognized the fact that the H-1B status was often used by workers eligible for an employment-based category but who had not yet received it either because their Form I-140 petition was stuck, or because they were waiting for their Priority Date to become current, or because their Form I-485 application for Adjustment of Status was taking a long time. To accommodate this reality, it provided for people to extend their H-1B status (without having the extensions count toward limits).
- They changed the way the fees generated from H-1B were used, so as to address the issue of shortages of skilled labor within the United States.

=== Section 102: Temporary increase in visa allotments ===
At the time that AC21 was passed, there was a huge backlog in H-1B visa applications. The act sought to increase to 195,000 the caps for fiscal years 2001 to 2003 and retroactively raise the caps for 1999 (to include all cases approved after the cap was raised and before October 1, 2000) and for 2000 (to include all cases filed after the cap was reached and before September 1, 2000).

This temporary increase was not extended 2004 onward. However, the H-1B Visa Reform Act of 2004 made a more long-term but weaker increase in the number of H-1B slots: specifically, the first 20,000 applicants with master's degrees would be exempt from the cap of 65,000.

=== Section 103: Special rules for universities and research facilities ===
This section introduced what has now become known as the "uncapped H-1B". Prior to AC21, all H-1B visas were counted towards the annual cap. Section 103 provided that employees of higher educational institutions, nonprofit research organizations, and government research organizations would not be counted toward the H-1B cap.

An earlier version of AC21 had included all recipients of graduate degrees as eligible for uncapped H-1Bs, but the provision was removed from the final bill.

The section also specified that people whose current H-1B is on an uncapped visa will be counted toward the cap if they switch to a job that is subject to a cap (any job other than at a higher educational institution. nonprofit research organization, or government research organization).

The special rules for universities and research facilities were further expanded with the H-1B Visa Reform Act of 2004.

=== Section 103 continued: counting rules ===
Prior to AC21, if an individual filed a H-1B petition for a new job while already on a H-1B, the new petition was counted towards the annual cap. Now those who had already been counted towards a cap in the last six years were not counted towards the cap, and a person filing multiple petitions was counted towards the cap only once.

One effect of this was to reduce the pressure on the numerical cap, making it easier for those changing jobs but also reducing the competition for first-time cap-subject applicants. Another effect, particularly in future years when the cap would get filled in the first week of April (six months before the start of the fiscal year on October 1), was that people could switch jobs between employers without having to wait for the right time of year to make the transition, and without the six-month lead time that is de facto necessary for cap-subject applications.

=== Section 104: Limitations on per-country ceiling with respect to employment-based immigrants ===
The employment-based immigrant categories (EB-1, EB-2, and EB-3) have, in addition to an overall ceiling, per-country ceilings based on the country of chargeability. AC21 made unused slots from a given country available for use for the general category.

Additionally, H-1B nonimmigrants reaching the six-year limit of stay and with pending or approved I-140s but waiting for their Priority Date to become current, were allowed to extend their H-1B status in three-year increments until decisions were made on their adjustment of status applications.

=== Section 105: Increased portability of H-1B status ===
A person already working in the US on H-1B status would now be allowed to file a petition to work for a new employer and start working even before the petition is approved if the petition is filed before the end of the previous work authorization period. Work authorization ceases as soon as the petition is denied. The person can continue working in the new job for up to 240 days while the petition is being adjudicated.

=== Other provisions in Title I ===
Some other less significant sections are discussed below:

- Section 106 included special provisions in case of lengthy adjudications. In particular, it allowed extensions by one year at a time of the H-1B status for people with long-pending Form I-140 petitions (pending for at least 365 days). It also allowed people with Form I-485 petitions that had been pending for more than 180 days to switch jobs without invalidating the underlying Form I-140 and labor certification.
- Section 107 added on more H-1B dependent attestations (made in Labor Condition Applications) as well as additional United States Department of Labor investigative authority, consistent with the American Competitiveness and Workforce Improvement Act.
- Section 108 provided that if a H-1B visa is revoked due to fraud or willful misrepresentation, the H-1B number for that petition will be added to the cap the following year. Previously, this had been done only if the petition was revoked in the same year that it was approved.
- Section 109 required the National Science Foundation to conduct a study of the divergence in access to high technology in the United States and report to the United States Congress within 18 months of enactment.
- Section 110 reallocated funds collected from the $500 fee enacted in the ACWIA to projects and programs aimed at improving higher technology skills in the US domestic workforce. Sections 111-113 provided more details on how these funds should be allocated. Also, the fee was increased to $1000 by the time AC21 became law.
- Section 114 excluded some J nonimmigrants from numerical limitations applicable to H-1B nonimmigrants.
- Section 115 required United States Department of Commerce to conduct a study on the digital divide.
- Section 116 was a severability provision that said that if any amendment or provision of the Act was deemed invalid, the rest of the Act would remain.

=== Title II ===
Title II of the Act, titled "Immigration Services and Infrastructure Improvements", provided guidelines on expected times for the INS to process applications (set as 180 days) and defined "backlog" as the number of applications that were waiting for more than that time. It also set requirements for INS to report to the United States Congress.

Although this did not have any direct or immediate effect, the INS did over time start providing more guidance regarding processing times. In 2001, the Premium Processing Service was launched for Form I-129, and this was subsequently extended to Form I-140 in 2006. In the 2010s, the United States Citizenship and Immigration Services (the descendant of INS that handles the processing of Forms I-129 and I-140) started defining processing time goals and publishing current USCIS processing times at its Service Centers and Field Offices.

== Reception ==
An article by Naomi Schorr and Stephen Yale-Loehr in 2003 reviewed AC21, noting the paucity of official USCIS guidance regarding the implementation of the law, while reviewing statements and memoranda by USCIS officials to understand its implications.

A draft memo circulated by USCIS in May 2005 was praised by Immigration Daily as extremely reasonable.

A paper by Carl Lin in 2011 reviewed the effect of immigration policy changes for high-skilled immigration on employers and shareholders in the United States. The paper considered the Immigration Act of 1990, the American Competitiveness and Workforce Improvement Act of 1998, and AC21. Lin's work was cited in Bloomberg by Charles Kenny.

A paper by the Research and Policy Committee of the Committee for Economic Development said of AC21: "CED accepts that AC21 is a necessary response to the exploding demand for high-technology workers. But Congress missed an extraordinary opportunity—one which typically arises no more than once a decade in immigration policy—to achieve deeper, essential reforms that AC21 now makes all the more urgent. As this report illustrates, the fundamental and pervasive problems with the entire immigration system extend far beyond the need for temporary high-technology workers. By focusing narrowly on the H-1B issue and only tentatively dealing with other issues, this legislation neglects other fundamental problems."

== Relation with other laws ==
=== American Competitiveness and Workforce Improvement Act ===
AC21 built upon ACWIA (passed in 1998) but their areas of focus were somewhat different. While the main purpose of ACWIA was to crack down on perceived fraud and misuse of the H-1B status, the main goal of AC21 was to make it easier to hire skilled workers in the United States.

=== Legal Immigration Family Equity Act ===
The Legal Immigration Family Equity Act was passed on December 21, 2000, shortly after the passage of AC21, by the same Congress. While AC21 focused on the problem of skilled workers (both non-immigrant workers in H-1B status and immigrant workers in the employment-based immigration categories, corresponding to USCIS Form I-129 and Form I-140 respectively), the primary focus of the LIFE Act was family-based immigration (the IR and F categories, corresponding to USCIS Form I-130). However, both addressed a similar set of problems: a huge backlog, both in terms of the processing times for applications, and in terms of the availability of visa numbers due to the numerical limits placed on immigration.

=== H-1B Visa Reform Act of 2004 ===
The H-1B Visa Reform Act of 2004 was the last major legislation surrounding the H-1B status. It did not renew the temporary increases in the size of the H-1B cap, but it did add 20,000 additional slots for applicants with master's degrees. In addition, it expanded the investigative authority of the U.S. Department of Labor and provided employers with standard lines of defense.
