= American Competitiveness and Workforce Improvement Act of 1998 =

Act of the US Congress

The American Competitiveness and Workforce Improvement Act (ACWIA) was an act passed by the government of the United States on October 21, 1998 (while Bill Clinton was President of the United States), pertaining to high-skilled immigration to the United States, particularly immigration through the H-1B visa, and helping improving the capabilities of the domestic workforce in the United States to reduce the need for foreign labor.

== History ==
According to a history of the law by Jung Hahm for Cornell Law Review, the proximal impetus for the ACWIA was that, for the first time, the H-1B quota was oversubscribed in 1997. Whereas some interests aligned with employers in industries using H-1B workers wanted to increase or even eliminate the caps on number of visas, others, specifically a vocal minority in Congress, as well as labor unions and the White House, were opposed to such expansion due to concerns about the effect on native wages and employment opportunities. ACWIA was a compromise bill hashed out in the Fall of 1998 between these competing interest groups.

One of the ideas considered and rejected during the process was that of imposing a requirement for all H-1Bs to show that efforts had been made to recruit a native worker with the same qualifications. Senator Spencer Abraham critiqued this requirement by noting that the huge amount of time taken for Permanent Labor Certification (the corresponding recruitment requirement for permanent immigrants) did not make sense for temporary work.

ACWIA was followed by the American Competitiveness in the 21st Century Act (AC21) passed in 2000, that significantly restructured the H-1B to allow for a lot more temporary workers without any official changes to the caps, while also giving a few more years' grace period before the cap would become binding again.

== Provisions ==
=== Section 411: Temporary increase in H-1B cap ===
The annual cap for H-1B visas is 65,000. Section 411 increased this annual cap to 115,000 for Fiscal Year 1999; 115,000 in Fiscal Year 2000; and 107,500 in Fiscal Year 2001. The cap would return to 65,000 starting with Fiscal Year 2002.

=== Section 412: Protection Against Displacement of United States Workers In Case of H-1B Dependent Employers ===
This section introduced the concept of H-1B-dependent employers, defined as employers who crossed a particular threshold in terms of both the absolute number and proportion of their workforce on H-1Bs. Both H-1B-dependent employers and employers who had been found to commit a willful misrepresentation of material fact in a recent application were required to submit additional attestations in their Labor Condition Applications. These attestations continue to be required as of 2015.

=== Section 413(a): Changes to Enforcement and Penalties ===
Historically, one of the criticisms of the H-1B regime had been that, even though applicants were required to make particular attestations in their Labor Condition Applications, there were very few penalties for those who lied or misrepresented facts in their attestations. ACWIA sought to correct their perceived problem by laying out explicit penalties, in addition to the extra attestations required by Section 412.

Below are the various provisions of this section:

- Basic Penalties: $1,000 fine and not less than 1 year debarment for failure to meet the no strike or lockout or layoff attestations .
- Willful Penalties: $5,000 fine and not less than 2 year debarment for any willful failure to meet any attestation condition, or willful misrepresentation of a material fact, or violation of the whistleblower clause.
- Heightened Penalties for Severe Violations: $35,000 fine and no less than 3 year debarment for willful failure or willful misrepresentation of a material fact in the course of which an employer displaced a U.S. worker within the 90 days before and 90 days after the filing of a visa petition based on the application.
- Whistleblower protection: Protection for employees who may expose or report employers for violations of H-1B rules in their companies.
- New penalty for “unconscionable contract provisions": Employer may be fined $1000 per violation for requiring an H-1B nonimmigrant to pay a penalty for leaving the employer's employ prior to a date agreed to by the nonimmigrant and the employer.
- No "benching" rule: Employers must pay H-1B nonimmigrants the required wage for the full hours specified on the H-1B visa petition even if the beneficiary is in nonproductive status due to a decision by the employer, or based on the nonimmigrant's lack of a permit of license, i.e., full-time employees must be paid full-time wages, and part-time employees must be paid for the minimum hours stated on the petition. Further, employers must pay H-1B nonimmigrants the required wage beginning no later than 30 days after the date the nonimmigrant is admitted to the United States pursuant to the petition, or 60 days after the nonimmigrant becomes eligible to work for the employer. However, this provision does not apply for nonproductive time due to non-work-related factors, such as voluntary absence (at the request of the nonimmigrant) or circumstances rendering the individual unable to work. Schools or other educational institutions may apply established salary practices to H-1B nonimmigrants, including payment for less than 12 months, as long as such payment schedule is agreed to by the H-1B nonimmigrant. Violation of this provision is considered a violation of the wage requirement and subject to the same penalties.
- New Benefits Requirement: Employers must offer H-1B nonimmigrants benefits and eligibility for benefits (including participation in health, life, disability, and other insurance plans, retirement and savings plans, bonuses and stock options) on the same basis, and in accordance with the same criteria as are offered to U.S. workers. Violations of this provision are treated as violations of the wage requirement and subject to the same penalties.

=== Section 413(b): Arbitration for Disputes Involving the Qualification of U.S. Workers ===
Guidelines were set up for the receipt and review of complaints regarding an employer's failure to offer a job opportunity to a qualified U.S. worker (if required to so attest) or misrepresentation of material facts with regard to such condition. Note that not all employers were required to make such attestations. Rather, only those who were deemed to be H-1B-dependent or had committed willful violations of the law were required to attest to good-faith efforts to recruit American workers.

=== Other parts of Section 413 ===
- Section 413(c) said that an employer who placed a worker with another employer was liable for any displacement of US workers at the other employer's worksite. Therefore, if required to make additional attestations due to being H-1B-dependent or having committed a past willful misrepresentation of material fact, it was the employer's responsibility to make sure that the other employer was not firing a US worker between 90 days before and after the placement.
- Section 413(d) gave the United States Department of Labor the authority to commit (random, on-site) spot investigations into employers who had committed a willful violation in the last five years.
- Section 413(e) gave the United States Department of Labor "new investigative authority" to investigate an employer for H-1B compliance if it receives “specific, credible information” from a source likely to have knowledge of the employer's practices, employment conditions or compliance. Such information must provide “reasonable cause” to believe that a violation of the LCA requirements (excepting the posting requirement) has been committed. DOL may conduct a 30-day investigation upon obtaining the personal signature of the Secretary of Labor (or the Acting Secretary).

=== Section 414: New fees for scholarships and training ===
This section specified an additional $500 fee (over and above filing fees) for H-1B applicants, that would be used to fund scholarship and training programs, and to fund United States Department of Labor administration and enforcement activities for the program. The fee would be collected by the Attorney General at the time of filing an initial petition to grant a foreign national H-1B status, upon the first petition to extend the stay of an H-1B nonimmigrant, and upon a petition by a different employer for concurrent or new employment. It is not required when filing for extensions of stay after the initial extension by the same employer, nor for amended petitions that do not request extension of stay. The employer was not allowed to recoup the fee from the alien worker through any means (such as a salary or benefit cut).

Colleges, universities and non-profit research institutions would be exempt from this fee.

=== Section 415: Hathaway Prevailing Wage Fix, Athletic Prevailing Wages ===
For institutions of higher education, related or affiliated nonprofit entities or nonprofit or governmental research organizations, the prevailing wage (for both LCAs and Permanent Labor Certifications) shall only take into account employees at such institutions and organizations in the area of employment. The prevailing wage for professional athletes in professional sports leagues is that set forth in the league regulations. Both changes are effective as of the date of enactment.

=== Other sections ===
- Section 416: The Immigration and Naturalization Service (the predecessor to what is now the United States Citizenship and Immigration Service) was required to maintain accurate numbers of H-1B and H-2B nonimmigrants who are issued visas or otherwise provided status, including revising petition forms, and shall make quarterly reports to Congress on the numbers. Some more reporting requirements were also instituted.
- Section 417: Report on Age Discrimination in the Information Technology Field: The joint report by the National Science Foundation and National Academy of Sciences is due October 1, 2000.
- Section 418: Report on H-1B usage:
  - A study by the National Science Foundation on the labor market needs for workers with high technology skills during the next 10 years is due to the House and Senate Judiciary Committees on October 1, 2000.
  - Any member of the Cabinet, the Chairman of the Federal Reserve, the Director of the Office of Management and Budget, or the Chair of the Council of Economic Advisors is required to promptly report to Congress the results of any reliable study that suggests that the increase in H-1B visas has affected any national economic indicator (such as inflation or unemployment) that warrants action by Congress.
- Section 421: Special Immigrant Status for Certain NATO Civilian Employees
- Section 431: Academic Honoraria for people on short term B visa trips to academic institutions.

== Reception ==
A paper by Jung Hahm in Cornell Law Review in 2000 reviewed the ACWIA as an attempt at balancing economic and labor interests, and proposed doing away with the caps entirely, instead moving all enforcement functions to the United States Department of Labor.

A paper by Lindsay Lowell at the Center for Comparative Immigration Studies in May 2000 attempted to estimate the population of H-1B temporary workers and how it was likely to change with the passage of ACWIA.

A paper by Carl Lin in 2011 reviewed the effect of immigration policy changes for high-skilled immigration on employers and shareholders in the United States. The paper considered the Immigration Act of 1990, ACWIA, and the American Competitiveness in the 21st Century Act (of 2000). Lin's work was cited in Bloomberg by Charles Kenny.

A paper by the Brookings Institution in 2013 proposed changes to the ACWIA to better align H-1 visa fee revenues to local workforce needs.
