= Permanent Labor Certification =

Step in the US employment-based immigration process

Permanent Labor Certification (not to be confused with the Labor Condition Application, LCA) is a process step required by some categories of employment-based immigration to the United States of America. Its stated goal is to "protect U.S. workers and the U.S. labor market by ensuring that foreign workers seeking immigrant visa classifications are not displacing equally qualified and willing U.S. workers". U.S. workers are defined as U.S. citizens, nationals or U.S. lawful permanent residents.

In 2005, an electronic filing system for Permanent Labor Certification was introduced called Program Electronic Review Management or PERM, a widely used term by which the process as a whole is now known.

There are several options available to U.S. employers who wish to hire foreign, non-immigrant workers on a temporary but long-term basis: H-1B visas, L-1 visas, TN status, and other options. These temporary options are often sufficient to meet the needs of employer and employee. When a U.S. employer wishes to hire the services of the foreign worker on a permanent basis, however, a complex sponsorship process for the green card begins, a process that can take years. Generally (although not always), the first step in that process is Permanent Labor Certification, which is a process of proving that there are no qualified and willing U.S. workers for the position being offered. Legally speaking, if there is even one minimally qualified U.S. worker available, then the foreign worker cannot be offered the position on a permanent basis. However, this does not necessarily mean that the foreign worker will be immediately replaced by the U.S. worker. The foreign worker can still serve out the remainder of their existing U.S. temporary visa, and their employer is permitted to re-apply for Permanent Labor Certification for sponsoring their employment-based green card. But it does create a substantial inconvenience for the U.S. employer who wishes to hire a foreign worker, which does provide some protection to U.S. workers, although the process is controversial. Changes in United States Citizenship and Immigration Services (USCIS) policy in 2026 have led some employers to reassess aspects of employment-based permanent residence strategy, including the relative use of adjustment of status and consular processing.

== First step: Prevailing Wage determination (PWD) ==
The first part of the Permanent Labor Certification is the Prevailing Wage Determination (PWD). Before the labor market can be tested to see whether any U.S. workers are qualified and willing to work in a given position for which a foreign citizen is being sponsored, the Department of Labor is required to determine what the average prevailing U.S. wage for that position is. The prevailing wage is based on what an average U.S. worker earns in the same position as the sponsored job, at the same approximate work location. For example, an advanced level U.S. computer programmer would typically have a higher prevailing wage if employed in the San Francisco Bay Area than in Indianapolis. The PWD is designed to ensure that U.S. salaries are not dragged down or undercut by foreign workers desperate enough for a green card to game the process by accepting lower wages than U.S. workers would normally accept for the position put through the Permanent Labor Certification process. To request a PWC, employers must complete Form ETA-9141 (Application for Prevailing Wage Determination) and submit it to the Department of Labor's National Prevailing Wage Center (NPWC). It takes 6-8 months for PWDs to be issued as of 2024.

=== Appeal of Prevailing Wage Determination ===
If they believe it is too high, sponsoring employers can appeal the prevailing wage level as determined by DOL's NPWC. The Board of Alien Labor Certification Appeals (BALCA) is responsible for adjudicating appeals.

== Recruitment ==
After the PWD has been issued, the labor market needs to be tested by the sponsoring employer to see if there any U.S. workers who both possess the minimum qualifications and are willing to do the job at the desired work location, at the PWD-determined salary. To this end, sponsoring employers are required to advertise the position (mentioning the exact duties and minimum qualifications that were used to obtain the PWD) in or on:

- Sunday newspapers of general circulation in the area of employment, for two Sundays
- The website of the official workforce agency of the state in which the job site is located (for example: www.employflorida.com for Florida), for 30 days.

In addition, sponsoring employers need to advertise the position in any three of the following ways:

- The sponsoring employer's website
- Job fairs
- Campus placement offices
- Radio and television advertisements
- On campus recruiting
- Private employment firms
- Employee referral program with incentives
- Local newspapers
- Trade or professional organizations
- Online job boards

== Applying for Permanent Labor Certification ==
If the recruitment period ends with no qualified and willing US workers applying, the sponsoring employer can finally apply for a Permanent Labor Certification with DOL by filing form ETA-9089. By filing the form, the sponsoring employer attests that no minimally qualified and willing U.S. workers could be found. As of early 2024, processing of this application takes approximately 12 months, but can take significantly longer if the case is audited by DOL. DOL can deny Permanent Labor Certification if it deems proper procedures have not been followed, or request an audit.

=== Appeal of Permanent Labor Certification denial ===
As with Prevailing Wage Determination decisions, sponsoring employers can appeal DOL denials of Permanent Labor Certifications with BALCA.

== Reduction In Recruitment (RIR) ==
The original Permanent Labor Certification process, used exclusively up until about 1998, involved a lengthy interview process, whereby instructions were provided after filing the case as to how the employer was to go about recruiting for the position. After complying with those instructions, the employer needed to persuasively argue why any U.S. applicants for the position were unqualified - otherwise the petition would be denied. Beginning in 1998, a more streamlined approach called Reduction In Recruitment (RIR) was introduced. Under RIR, the sequence of events was reversed: the employer first did the recruiting, and then filed the case with evidence that no minimally qualified and willing U.S. workers could be found.

RIR tended to speed processing times up somewhat, so that Permanent Labor Certification times which were previously measured in years began to be measured in months. Both regular and RIR Permanent Labor Certification involved filing first with the Department of Labor for the individual state where the job was located (the individual state presumably being most familiar with local labor market conditions) and then, if approved at the state level, the case was then transferred to the federal Department of Labor for final approval.

== Program Electronic Review Management (PERM) ==
In March 2005, a completely electronic Permanent Labor Certification system, Program Electronic Review Management (PERM), came into use. PERM was intended to reduce Permanent Labor Certification times to under 60 days. However, PERM may be creating as many backlogs as it is intended to solve. Because of congressionally mandated annual quotas, there may not be enough visas available to grant green cards to everyone who is approved by PERM, which may have played a role in the retrogression of priority dates on September 13, 2005.

The standards used in making Permanent Labor Certification determinations under the PERM system would be based on:

1) whether there are not sufficient United States workers who are qualified and willing,

2) whether the employment of the alien will have an adverse effect on the wages and working conditions of United States workers similarly employed, and

3) whether the employer has met the procedural requirements of the regulations.

The employer has the option of filing a PERM application electronically (using web-based forms and instructions) or by mail. However, the Department of Labor recommends that employers file electronically. Not only is electronic filing faster, but it would also ensure the employer has provided all required information, as an electronic application can not be submitted if the required fields are not completed.

The employer must recruit under the standards for professional occupations, if the occupation involved is on the list of occupations, published in the PERM regulation, for which a bachelors or higher degree is a customary requirement.

For all other occupations not normally requiring a bachelor's or higher degree, employers can simply recruit under the requirements for nonprofessional occupations. Although the occupation involved in a Permanent Labor Certification application may be a nonprofessional occupation, the regulations do not prohibit employers from conducting more recruitment than is specified for such occupations. Therefore, if the employer is uncertain whether an occupation is considered professional or not, the employer is advised to conduct recruitment for a professional occupation.

== Controversy ==
As with many immigration procedures, Permanent Labor Certification tends to be controversial. Its backers argue that it is a rigorous procedure for determining that only foreign workers who truly have skills needed by the U.S. labor market and not readily available locally are hired. Its critics, however, say that U.S. employers will first hire a foreigner on a long-term temporary visa, and then try to tailor the job description so that that foreigner is the only person who could possibly be hired - thus gaming the Permanent Labor Certification process to guarantee a favorable outcome. However, the job requirements, as described by the petitioning employer in the Permanent Labor Certification application, must represent the employer’s actual minimum requirements for the job opportunity. Those job requirements described on a Permanent Labor Certification application are reviewed and evaluated closely by the Department of Labor in accordance with the Code of Federal Regulations that sets forth the standards for determining the appropriate requirements for a job opportunity. Ultimately, the employer must prove that they have not hired workers with less training or experience for jobs substantially comparable to that involved in the job opportunity.

== Differences with labor condition application ==
Permanent Labor Certification should not be confused with the Labor Condition Application, the corresponding process for temporary work visas. The differences are presented in table form below:

Attribute	Labor Condition Application	Permanent Labor Certification
Type of visa	Temporary work visa: H-1B, H-1B1, or E-3	Employment-based immigrant visa (such as EB-2 visa, or EB-3 visa) that provides a path to permanent residency (a green card)
Typical time for approval	Less than a week	6-24 months
Burden of proof	The employer needs to demonstrate that the worker is being paid at least the prevailing wage for that region and occupation, and comparable to U.S. workers in the firm, and that employing the worker will not adversely affect current workers. The employer does not need to demonstrate that there is no qualified and willing U.S. worker for the job.	The employer needs to demonstrate that there is no qualified U.S. worker willing to do the job at a comparable wage, and needs to have made a good-faith effort to recruit a U.S. worker.

== See also ==
- Labour shortage
