= Streamlined filing compliance procedures =

The streamlined filing compliance procedures (called the streamlined procedures for short when the context is clear) is a set of procedures offered by the Internal Revenue Service in the United States to help United States taxpayers (individual taxpayers or couples filing jointly only; institutions cannot avail of these procedures) get back in compliance on the fronts of paying taxes related to their foreign financial assets as well as submitting all required information returns, after having non-willfully fallen out of compliance in one or more previous tax years.

The process used by the IRS to examine submissions under the streamlined filing compliance procedures is described in the Internal Revenue Manual, IRM Section 4.63.3 Offshore Voluntary Disclosure Program, Streamlined Filing Compliance Procedures and Voluntary Disclosure Practice.

== Filing process ==
=== Foreign versus domestic cases ===
There are two versions of the streamlined procedures:

- Streamlined Foreign Offshore Procedures: This version of the procedures is for individual U.S. taxpayers or their estates who meet the non-residency requirement. The form used for these is Form 14653: Certification by U.S. Person Residing Outside of the United States for Streamlined Foreign Offshore Procedures.
  - For United States citizens and lawful permanent residents, this is based on the physical presence test being satisfied for any of the past three years. Specifically, it is defined as follows: "in any one or more of the most recent three years for which the U.S. tax return due date (or properly applied for extended due date) has passed, the individual did not have a U.S. abode and the individual was physically outside the United States for at least 330 full days."
  - For those who are not United States citizens or lawful permanent residents, this is based on the Substantial Presence Test failing for any of the past three years. Specifically, it is defined as follows: "in any one or more of the last three years for which the U.S. tax return due date (or properly applied for extended due date) has passed, the individual did not meet the substantial presence test of IRC section 7701(b)(3)."
- Streamlined Domestic Offshore Procedures: This version of the procedures is for individual U.S. taxpayers who fail to meet the non-residency requirement that would make them eligible for the Streamlined Foreign Offshore Procedures. The form used for these is Form 14654: Certification by U.S. Person Residing in the United States for Streamlined Domestic Offshore Procedures.

The Streamlined Foreign Offshore Procedures and the Streamlined Domestic Offshore Procedures differ primarily in that the latter procedures impose a 5% miscellaneous offshore penalty, whereas there is no similar offshore penalty for the Streamlined Foreign Offshore Procedures. See #5% miscellaneous offshore penalty in the domestic case for the specifics. When the streamlined procedures were initially introduced in 2012, they were available only for the foreign case and had no penalty. The domestic case was added subsequently effective July 1, 2014, as an intended replacement for the non-willful portion of the Offshore Voluntary Disclosure Program (OVDP) which had an offshore penalty attached to it.

=== Filing details ===
The IRS documentation on both the foreign and domestic cases of the streamlined procedures includes instructions on the filing process. A summary is below:

- For any submissions of delinquent or amended FBARs, the taxpayer needs to submit the FBARs online on the FinCEN website, with "Streamlined Filing Compliance Procedures" in the explanation box for the reason for filing late. The FBARs should not be included in the streamlined filing packet submitted to the IRS.
- The rest of the stuff being filed needs to be included in a single packet sent to an IRS address (specified on the website; there is no online submission option for the streamlined procedures) with an Attn note saying "Streamlined Foreign Offshore" or "Streamlined Domestic Offshore" respectively. This packet must include:
  - Amended tax returns for each of the applicable years (up to the past 3 years) including all required information returns (such as Forms 3520, 5471, and 8938) "even if these information returns would normally not be submitted with the Form 1040 had the taxpayer filed a complete and accurate original return." Delinquent original returns are not allowed. The first page of each amended tax return and each information return included must have at its top a note in red saying "Streamlined Foreign Offshore" or "Streamlined Domestic Offshore" as the case may be. The instructions call this critical to making sure the returns are processed through the special procedures.
  - Filled and signed Form 14653 (for the foreign case) or Form 14654 (for the domestic case), both an original version and copies included with each amended tax return and information return. The filled form includes a summary of the amounts involved by year; in the case of Form 14654, this is also where the 5% miscellaneous offshore penalty is calculated. This form is also where the taxpayer certifies that the failures were not willful, and where the taxpayer can include more explanation.
  - Payment of the amount due, for instance, in the form of a check. If the payment amount is not correct, the IRS will issue a refund or notice of balance due.

=== After achieving compliance ===
Once the streamlined filing has been submitted, the taxpayer must continue filing taxes for future years normally, including any required information returns and paying all required taxes.

=== The case of married couples ===
The streamlined filing compliance procedures allow for married couples to do streamlined filing together. Both Form 14653 and Form 14654 include this note:

Note: If this certification is a joint certification, the statements will be considered made on behalf of both spouses, even though the pronoun "I" is used. If spouses submitting a joint certification have different reasons for their failure to report all income, pay all tax, and submit all required information returns, including FBARs, they must state their individual reasons separately in the required statement of facts.

Streamlined filing also allows one person in a married couple that filed returns jointly to submit the streamlined filing without the other partner's signature, as long as each joint amended return shows a net increase in tax. This is covered in SFO FAQ 7 (for the streamlined foreign offshore procedures) and SDO FAQ 14 (for the streamlined domestic offshore procedures).

== Effect other ongoing or past tax processes may have on streamlined filing ==
=== Streamlined filing is not available if the IRS has initiated a civil examination of the taxpayer's returns for any taxable year ===
According to the IRS webpage: "If the IRS has initiated a civil examination of taxpayer's returns for any taxable year, regardless of whether the examination relates to undisclosed foreign financial assets, the taxpayer will not be eligible to use the streamlined procedures. Taxpayers under examination may consult with their agent. Similarly, a taxpayer under criminal investigation by IRS Criminal Investigation is also ineligible to use the streamlined procedures."

=== Streamlined filing does not absolve taxpayers of previous penalty assessments ===
Taxpayers who have previously engaged in "quiet disclosure", such as amending returns or filing delinquent returns to include information on assets and income, may still use streamlined procedures. However, previous penalties that have already been assessed are not waived by streamlined filing.

=== Relationship with the Offshore Voluntary Disclosure Program (OVDP) ===
The Offshore Voluntary Disclosure Program (OVDP) is a now-closed program (it closed on September 28, 2018) that played a similar role to the streamlined filing compliance procedures. Any taxpayer who submitted a voluntary disclosure letter under OVDP on or after July 1, 2014, is not eligible to participate in the streamlined filing compliance procedures. Taxpayers who submitted a voluntary disclosure letter under OVDP (or any predecessor program) prior to July 1, 2014, but who do not yet have a fully executed OVDP closing agreement, may request treatment under the applicable penalty terms available under the streamlined procedures.

== Alternatives ==
=== Quiet disclosure ===
Quiet disclosure refers to taxpayers disclosing without going through the streamlined procedures or any other official program for disclosing past noncompliance. This could include:

- Starting the reporting of assets and income going forward, without reporting it for past years
- Filing delinquent or amended returns for prior years including some or all previously omitted information on foreign assets and income, but without explicitly going through a disclosure program.

Quiet disclosure is discouraged by the IRS as well as by tax lawyers, who encourage using the streamlined procedures wherever possible, to stay compliant and reduce the risk of draconian penalties and audits.

== Effect on taxes, interest, and penalties ==
=== Streamlined filing does not reduce taxes or interest on taxes ===
Even with a streamlined filing, any taxes that were due are still owed by the taxpayer. Moreover, if the taxes are past the filing deadline for taxes, interest on these taxes is also due.

The lookback period for streamlined filing for tax returns is three years, which matches the IRS lookback period for auditing (the IRS can audit tax returns up to three years old, though it may under limited circumstances audit tax returns that are older). So, in practice, in most cases, only taxes due for the past three years matter, and the streamlined procedures already cover these taxes.

=== Properly done streamlined filing (both foreign and domestic) eliminates many penalties that may otherwise apply ===
Eligible taxpayers who do a proper streamlined filing eliminate many penalties that may otherwise apply: failure-to-file penalty, failure-to-pay penalty, accuracy-related penalty, information return penalties (for failure to include required information returns such as Forms 3520, 5471, and 8938 with their tax returns) and FBAR penalties (for failure to file or inaccuracies). This includes penalties for years prior to the years covered by the streamlined filing (if not assessed already); in particular, if the taxpayer fully catches up with FBAR for the past 6 years and with information returns and tax reporting for the past 3 years, the taxpayer will no longer have to pay the FBAR penalty or information return penalties not just for those past years but for prior years as well, if such penalties have not already been assessed.

=== 5% miscellaneous offshore penalty in the domestic case ===
The Streamlined Domestic Offshore Procedures include a 5% miscellaneous offshore penalty on the end-of-year balance for assets for which one of these is true:

- not reported on the FBAR (FinCEN Form 114) (in any year over the past 6 years)
- not report on Form 8938 (in any year over the past 3 years)
- income (such as interest and dividend income) from the asset not reported in the tax return (in any year over the past 3 years)

For each year, the total value of foreign financial assets subject to the penalty is calculated, then the maximum of the values across all years is taken; the penalty is 5% of this amount. The calculations are done as part of Form 14654.

== History ==
=== Offshore Voluntary Compliance Initiative (OVCI) of 2003 ===
The IRS has a long history of running compliance initiatives, encouraging taxpayers to disclose past intentional and unintentional tax non-compliance in order to avoid heavy civil penalties and the risk of criminal prosecution.

In 2003, the IRS ran an initiative called the Offshore Voluntary Compliance Initiative (OVCI). The program's goal was to encourage taxpayers who were using or had used offshore payment cards and similar financial arrangements to avoid taxes to come clean; taxpayers using OVCI were required to file taxes for the years of 1999 to 2001, with the option of filing taxes for 1996 to 1998 as well and a promise that previous years would not be audited. Around the same time, the IRS ran the Offshore Credit Card Program (OCCP), an enforcement initiative targeted at addressing the same kind of tax avoidance (the use of offshore payment cards). Around 1,321 people participated in OVCI.

=== Offshore Voluntary Disclosure Program (OVDP) (2009-2018) ===
The IRS had had four iterations of the Offshore Voluntary Disclosure Program (OVDP): 2009, 2011, 2012, 2014; these focused on paying taxes on income from foreign assets as well as filing FBARs. Unlike the streamlined filing compliance procedures, that is limited to non-willful violations, OVDP covered willful violations as well.

The 2009 OVDP was a one-off program (for a single year) that lasted until October 15, 2009. This iteration required the payment of back taxes for the period of 2003 to 2008, and in return provided civil penalty relief and the certainty of no criminal prosecution. It also imposed a 20% penalty on the maximum account value across the period of 2003 to 2008 of unreported accounts for FBAR, with the possibility of reduction to 5% in some cases.

The 2011 OVDP was also a one-off program that lasted until September 9, 2011. it was similar to the 2009 OVDP with a few changes: the range of years increased to 2003 to 2010 (versus 2003 to 2008 for the 2009 OVDP) and the penalty percentage increased to 25%, with the possibility to reduce it to 5%. The penalty percentage could be reduced to 5% for taxpayers who were unaware of being U.S. citizens, or for taxpayers satisfying a set of conditions such as infrequent use of the account, payment of taxes for all funds deposited into the account, and more.

The 2012 OVDP was an open-ended program (not limited to a single year).

The 2012 OVDP was modified in 2014 (modification announced June 18, 2014, effective July 1, 2014). The modification was accompanied by an expansion of the streamlined filing compliance procedures to cover a wider range of non-willful violations. The modification of the OVDP reduced its scope to "help focus this program on people seeking certainty and relief from criminal prosecution."

The OVDP was eventually closed, with September 28, 2018 being the last day to apply for the OVDP. Explaining the closure of the program, the IRS said: "While the program has been successful in the past, there has been a significant decline in the number of taxpayers participating as well as an increase in awareness of offshore tax and reporting obligations. The IRS has previously stated publicly that the 2014 OVDP would close at some time. Taxpayers have had the opportunity to participate in OVDP since 2009."

=== Introduction of streamlined filing compliance procedures (started September 2012, expanded July 1, 2014) ===
The IRS introduced the streamlined filing compliance procedures on September 1, 2012.

The streamlined filing compliance procedures were expanded significantly on July 1, 2014, with the changes announced June 18, 2014. These changes expanded the eligibility criteria, "eliminating a cap on the amount of tax owed to qualify for the program, and doing away with a questionnaire that applicants were required to complete." In more detail:

The expanded streamlined procedures are available to a wider population of U.S. taxpayers living outside the country and, for the first time, to certain U.S. taxpayers residing in the United States. The changes include:

- Eliminating a requirement that the taxpayer have $1,500 or less of unpaid tax per year;
- Eliminating the required risk questionnaire;
- Requiring the taxpayer to certify that previous failures to comply were due to non-willful conduct.

For eligible U.S. taxpayers residing outside the United States, all penalties will be waived. For eligible U.S. taxpayers residing in the United States, the only penalty will be a miscellaneous offshore penalty equal to 5 percent of the foreign financial assets that gave rise to the tax compliance issue.

At the same time, it was announced that taxpayers who were currently in OVDP had the opportunity to switch to the streamlined filing compliance procedures by submitting an additional certification that all their violations were non-willful.

In the frequently asked questions associated with the announcement of its decision to close the OVDP in 2018, the IRS reiterated that the streamlined filing compliance procedures would continue to remain available.
