= Foreign housing exclusion =

US Federal Tax regulation

The foreign housing exclusion goes hand-in-hand with the foreign earned income exclusion. According to section 911(a) of the federal tax code, a qualified individual under either the bona fide residence test or the physical presence test will be able to exclude from the gross income the housing amount in a foreign country provided for by the employer. Note that "provided for by the employer" does not require that the employer actually procure the housing. If housing is paid from wages paid by the employer, this will meet the test. However, housing expenses in excess of the wages or earnings from self-employment would not qualify.

The tax code defines the "housing amount" as the total of all qualified housing expenses less the "base housing amount." It is important to define what is considered qualified housing expenses as well as what the IRS means by the base housing amount.

== Qualification ==
In order to qualify, housing expenses must be reasonable expenses incurred by the expatriate or their spouse and dependents if they live together in a foreign country. An exception to this rule would be if a second foreign household is maintained for the spouse and dependents due certain adverse and unhealthful conditions such as warfare or civil unrest. As a result, qualified housing expenses for both the first and second foreign home would include the following:

- The fair rental value of housing provided by employer
- Utilities (except for telephone charges)
- Rent
- Repairs
- Real and personal property insurance
- Nonrefundable fees for securing a leasehold
- Nondeductible occupancy taxes
- Residential parking
- Rental of furniture and accessories

Outside of the above list, any other housing expenses are not considered qualified. In addition, the value of meals or lodging that is excluded from gross income will not be excludable for foreign housing exclusion purposes as this would be considered a double benefit. For example, it would not include:

- Buying property
- Labor
- TV or Cable Bills
- Furniture
- Improvements that increase the value of the property

Keep in mind that you cannot include any expenses that you have excluded from gross income, there is no double benefit, in short. There is also a limit on the amount of housing expenses one can incur, usually around 30% of the FEI exclusion times the number of days in the qualifying period, usually about $27,450 a year. You can sometimes get more than this standard limit if you live in a high-cost locality, these limits can be found on Form 2555.

== Second foreign household ==
If you have 2 foreign households, because your family cannot live near your work because of dangerous or unhealthful conditions, you may qualify for including the expenses of the second household. This can also include adverse living conditions including war, or if you need to live on a construction site or drilling rig.

== Foreign Housing Deduction ==
If you are not self-employed, even partially, you cannot take a housing deduction, although you may be eligible for exclusion, as mentioned earlier. If you are considered self-employed, then you can deduct the housing amount on line 36 of form 1040 and form 2555. If you are both employed and self-employed, you can deduct part of your housing amount and also exclude a portion of it.

== Couples ==
Determining a couples tax obligations matters if they are living together or separately.

== Limitations ==
Sections 911(c)(2)(A)(i) and 911(c)(2)(A)(ii) of the federal tax code limits the housing expenses eligible for the housing exclusion to 30% of the maximum foreign earned income exclusion. The result is then multiplied by the number of days in the qualifying period that fall within the tax year. For 2015, if the maximum foreign earned income exclusion is $100,800, eligible housing expenses for the year would be limited to $30,240 (30% of $100,800). However, qualified individuals living in high-cost neighborhoods are able to deduct more than the standard limit of $30,240 in 2015 but not more than the limits outlined in the Instructions for Form 2555.

In defining the base amount, section 911(c)(1)(B)(iii) of the federal tax code states that the amount is equal to 16% of the maximum foreign earned income exclusion multiplied by the number of qualifying days within the tax year. Once again, if the maximum foreign earned income exclusion for the 2015 tax year is $100,800, the base amount would be limited to $16,128 (16% of $100,800) for the year.

To illustrate, let's assume that an architect qualifies for the foreign earned income exclusion under the physical presence test with a qualifying period that includes all of 2015. He makes $69,000 through wages and had $18,000 in housing expenses. In determining the housing amount for the foreign housing exclusion, the housing expenses would meet the $30,240 limit for the year. However, $16,128 must be reduced from the $18,000 in order to arrive at the housing amount of $1,872 that is eligible for the foreign housing exclusion.

== Conclusion ==
It is important to reiterate that in order to take advantage of the housing exclusion, the housing amount must be paid for by employer-provided amounts or incurred from maintaining a qualified second foreign household. Secondly, if housing amounts are to be excluded, this must be calculated first before the foreign earned income exclusion can be determined. In other words, the housing amount must be deducted from the total foreign earned income to arrive at the excludable amount for foreign earned income exclusion purposes. Lastly, to choose the housing exclusion, Form 2555 is the only form allowed and must be completely filled out. Form 2555-EZ cannot be used to claim the foreign housing exclusion.
