= Use-of-money principle =

The use-of-money principle, also written as the use of money principle, is a principle invoked in the context of taxation in the United States (generally federal taxation, though many U.S. states also use a similar framework), that states that the government can charge interest for unpaid tax only if the government did not have use of that tax money (i.e., continuous possession of the money). In other words, interest can only be charged on the amount of tax that is both due and unpaid, regardless of whether the taxpayer has fulfilled other obligations, such as filing a tax return. The interpretation that the Internal Revenue Service (IRS, the agency that handles federal taxation) has for this is described in Revenue Ruling 99-40 of the Internal Revenue Manual, that uses the term "use of money". The corresponding statutory guidance is in Section 6601(a) of the Internal Revenue Code.

== Key aspects ==
=== Use as continuous possession ===
The original court case from which the use-of-money principle was first articulated is Manning v. Seeley Tube & Box Co. of New Jersey (1950). In this case, a taxpayer had a tax liability (due to underpayment) that was subsequently eliminated due to a net operating loss carryback. The court sided with the view that the taxpayer was still responsible for interest on the liability even though the liability itself had been eliminated by the net operating loss carryback. This established the idea that the government needed to have continuous possession of the funds from the point when they were due in order for there to be no interest liability.

== Nuances in application ==
=== Fundamental difference between the United States federal government and some taxpayer advocates ===
The general view of the United States federal government, including the IRS and the United States Department of Justice Tax Division, is that the "use-of-money principle" is a limited tool of statutory interpretation rather than a broad equitable principle (the latter being an interpretation used by some taxpayer advocates and in particular some plaintiffs in some of the court cases related to this). For instance, training material prepared for the DOJ Tax Division states: "In dealing with interest disputes, the governing provisions of the Code must always be the starting point."

=== Separation of accounts by time period (tax year) ===
The IRS has generally taken the view that the use-of-money principle for a given taxpayer is to be applied separately for each tax year. In other words, an overpayment for one year cannot cancel an underpayment for another year, so that the taxpayer is still responsible for interest on the latter. Payments can be moved across years only if the taxpayer does a credit elect transfer; a credit elect transfer can be done when timely-filing taxes, and it moves the tax overpayment from the tax year to the next one. In the view of the IRS, once the credit elect transfer is done, the money is no longer available in the account for the original year. Therefore, if a later amendment by the taxpayer or audit by the IRS leads to the determination of additional tax liability for the original year, then the amount transferred to future years is not in "use" for that tax liability. So, the taxpayer may have to pay interest for the entire period despite the IRS having the money with it, but tied to a later year.

Taxpayers have challenged this interpretation in the courts, and courts have had a mixed response, siding with the IRS in some cases and against the IRS in others:

- FleetBoston Fin. Corp. v. United States (2007): In this case, the court sided with the IRS's view that considers each tax year separately. Here, FleetBoston Fin. Corp., in its 1984 tax filing, estimated that it had overpaid its taxes, and used a credit elect to move this overpayment to 1985, then in 1985 it again estimated an overpayment and used a credit elect to move the overpayment to 1986. The IRS subsequently audited the company and ultimately determined that it had underpaid taxes for 1984 and 1985. The dispute was about whether the money that FleetBoston had initially paid for 1984 and then moved to later years through the credit elect was money that the IRS had "use" of. The IRS argued that once the money was moved to a subsequent year via a credit elect, the IRS no longer had use of the money for the original year (1984) and therefore should be able to charge interest for it. The court sided with the IRS's interpretation.
- Otis Spunkmeyer v. United States (2004): In this case, the court sided with the taxpayer. Specifically, the court ruled that if a taxpayer used a credit elect to move money but the year the money was being moved to already had sufficient funds, the credit elect was not needed and the IRS could be considered to still have "use" of that money for the original year.
- Goldring v. United States (2021): In this case, the district court sided with the IRS, but the Fifth Circuit court sided with the taxpayer. In this case, the Goldrings made a $5 million overpayment on their 2010 taxes as a safeguard against the IRS interpreting their income differently than the way the Goldrings classified it on their tax return. They then kept moving that overpayment to subsequent years using a credit elect transfer. Eventually, the IRS did end up choosing the interpretation that the Goldrings had thought it might, but it also ended up charging the Goldrings interest, claiming that the $5 million was not in the account for 2010. The district court sided with the IRS, but the Fifth Circuit court sided with the taxpayer, claiming that the IRS had use of the money all along even if it was not within the correct year.

In the ordinary tax return process, there is no provision for taxpayers to pay additional amounts of tax and keep them in the original tax year after filing a return, as a safeguard against interest if the IRS later determines that the tax was underpaid. However, starting in 2004, the IRS provided taxpayers the option to make "deposits" tied to a specific tax year, that taxpayers can use to cover disputable taxes. Authority to make deposits comes from Section 6603 of the Internal Revenue Code.

=== Timing of when money leaves the account for one year into the next in case of a credit elect transfer ===
In case of a credit elect transfer, money leaves the account for one year and goes into the next. If a deficiency is later determined for the original year, the question arises as to what the effective date is that the money left the account for the original year. Two important cases for this are:

- Avon Products, Inc. v. United States (1978): Here, the taxpayer argued that the money should be considered to have left the account for the original year (1967) only when the taxpayer actually did the credit elect transfer to the subsequent year (September 15, 1968), since there was an excess of money in the account for the original year until the credit elect transfer. In contrast, the IRS argued that the amount transferred out should be considered unavailable for 1967, and without that amount, the deficiency began on June 15. The court ruled in favor of the taxpayer, saying that the deficiency only began on September 15, after the credit elect transfer was done.
- May Department Stores Co. and Subsidiaries v. United States (1986): Here the taxpayer did not specify which of the installment payments for the next year the overpayment was being transferred to, so the IRS applied it to the first installment, so that the IRS charged interest from the date of the first installment. The court, however, used the date of filing the return (October 15) for determining the effective date of the credit elect transfer.

Based on the IRS's learnings from these, the Revised Rule 99–40 in the Internal Revenue Manual offers a little bit of flexibility regarding use of money for credit elect transfers from one year to the next. Specifically, when a taxpayer uses a credit elect transfer from one year to the next, and there is a subsequent determination that more tax was due for the original year, the transferred amount can be used to meet the liability if it isn't needed for the next year that the money is being transferred to. More specifically, the date from which interest starts getting charged is the date starting which the money actually starts being needed to meet next year's tax obligations. However, Revised Rule 99-40 only allows for this kind of calculation for up to one year and not on a rolling basis across years (as some plaintiffs such as Goldring argued for). At least in some cases, the taxpayer may need to file a claim requesting that Revenue Ruling 99-40 be applied, as the automatic calculation by IRS of interest due may not use Revised Rule 99–40.

== Penalties ==
The use-of-money principle only applies to interest, not to penalties. However, some penalties operate on a similar principle. Penalties are charged only under more extreme circumstances, many of which preclude some of the sources of dispute that apply to interest, so there isn't as much case law on them.

=== Failure-to-file penalty satisfies the use-of-money principle ===
The failure-to-file penalty is assessed only in case the taxpayer does not file a bona fide return by the due date for filing returns, and either does not timely-file for an extension (extensions are available for about six months after the original due date) or fails to file the return within the time limit for the extension. However, the failure-to-file penalty does adhere to the use-of-money principle in that it is zero if there is no tax that is due and unpaid. Specifically, the failure-to-file penalty is "5% of the unpaid taxes for each month or part of a month that a tax return is late. The penalty won't exceed 25% of your unpaid taxes." Therefore, if the taxpayer fails to file, but has paid the amount of tax that is due, or has an overpayment, then the taxpayer does not have any failure-to-file penalty.

The failure-to-file penalty is not relevant to the cases discussed here since all these cases are in the context of timely-filed tax returns with a credit elect transfer.

=== Failure-to-pay penalty satisfies the use-of-money principle ===
The failure-to-pay penalty is assessed in case of failure to pay taxes shown on the return (this starts from the due date of taxes), or failure to pay taxes not shown on the return (this starts from the due date of the notice requesting payment of the taxes). In both cases, the failure-to-pay penalty per month is set as a percentage (0.5%) of the unpaid tax. Therefore, there is no failure-to-pay penalty if there is no tax that is both due and unpaid.

=== Informational return penalties do not satisfy the use-of-money principle ===
In some cases, penalties are assessed for failing to file specific informational forms if one needs to file them. In these cases, the failure is not tied to nonpayment of tax, so the use-of-money principle does not apply. Two examples:

- The FBAR (FinCEN Form 114, formerly TD-F 90-22.1), that needs to be filed by individuals having more than $10,000 in foreign financial accounts at any time within the tax year. Failure to timely-file the FBAR can result in civil and/or criminal penalties depending on the circumstances. These penalties are not tied to nonpayment of tax, so the use-of-money principle doesn't apply to them.
- Form 8938, that needs to be filed by individuals having more a threshold amount of money in foreign financial accounts, where the threshold depends on whether filing as an individual or as a couple, and based on whether one is living in the United States or abroad. The penalty for failing to include Form 8938 in the tax return is $10,000 per year, with additional penalties for continuing to not file it after being notified by the IRS. This penalty is not tied to nonpayment of tax, so the use-of-money principle does not apply to it.

== Applicability to U.S. states ==
U.S. states have also adopted the use-of-money principle in setting their own tax rules. Below are a few examples:

- California: California Franchise Tax Board's guidance on interest uses "use of money" for interest calculation; it also follows the Internal Revenue Manual's Revenue Ruling 99-40 when calculating interest in case of credit elect transfers from one year to the next. Moreover, both failure-to-file and failure-to-pay penalties are charged only if there is tax that is due and unpaid, so these penalties also satisfy the use-of-money principle.
- Illinois: The interest calculation, as described in Publication 103, implicitly uses the use-of-money principle (without stating it by name) insofar as it calculates interest only on the unpaid portion of taxes. Similarly, for penalties, starting 2001, the late-filing penalty is charged only on the "amount required to be shown due on the return and reduced by timely payments or credits", adhering to the use-of-money principle.
