= Green Card Test =

The Green Card Test (GCT) is a criterion used by the Internal Revenue Service (IRS) in the United States to determine whether an individual qualifies as a "resident for tax purposes". The GCT asks whether, during the calendar year, an individual spent at least one day in the US as a lawful permanent resident (i.e. possessed a green card). In particular, it is not required to possess a green card when the individual files a return. The GCT is used alongside the Substantial Presence Test; specifically, an alien is considered a "resident for tax purposes" if they pass either the GCT or the Substantial Presence Test. Residency for income tax purposes is different than immigration purposes, i.e. an individual may be considered a resident for income tax purposes, but non-resident for immigration purposes.

== Exceptions ==
There exists an exception to the Green Card Test if an individual stops being a lawful permanent resident during the calendar year. Specifically, if an individual voluntarily renounces and abandons resident status by writing to the United States Citizenship and Immigration Services (USCIS), if the USCIS administratively terminates the individual's immigrant status, or if a US federal court judicially terminates the individual's immigrant status, then the individual no longer holds US resident status, and moreover fails the GCT.

== Providing documentation ==
Form W-9 is used to inform the withholding agent that an individual is a "resident for tax purposes".

Passing the Green Card Test guarantees that an individual will be treated as a "resident for tax purposes" for the entire year. However, a withholding agent must wait until receiving an official document from the Immigration and Naturalization Service to treat the individual as a "resident for tax purposes".

== Residency for tax purposes does not imply permanent residency ==
It is possible to be a resident for tax purposes in the United States but to not be a permanent resident of the United States. A non-citizen can be a permanent resident of the United States only if he/she holds a Green Card. On the other hand, people on non-immigrant visas may well be treated as residents for tax purposes if they pass the Substantial Presence Test.

== Similar tests in other countries ==
- Statutory Residence Test in the United Kingdom
- Physical presence test, used to determine the tax status of US citizens and permanent residents who lived or earned income abroad.
