= F visa =

US non-immigrant student visa type

In the United States, the F series of visa is a class of non-immigrant student visa that allows foreigners to pursue education (academic studies and/or language training programs) in the United States. F-1 students must maintain a full course of study. F-1 visas are only issued in U.S. embassies and consulates, although extensions of stay and changes of status may be possible within the United States. Prospective F-1 students must apply to a school and receive a form I-20 in order to apply for an F-1 visa. F-1 students must show that they are able to support themselves during their stay in the U.S., as their opportunities for legal employment are quite limited. F-2 visas are given to dependents of an F-1 student. F-2 visa holders are prohibited from any form of compensated employment. However, minor children may attend public schools. Finally, the F-3 visa is issued to Canadians and Mexicans who commute across the border to attend American schools.

== Types ==
There are three types of F visas,

- F-1 visas are for full-time students.
- F-2 visas are for spouses and children of F-1 visa holders — these are technically called "dependents."
- F-3 visas are for "border commuters" who reside in their country of origin while attending school in the United States. F-3 visas are granted only to nationals of Mexico or Canada and these visa holders may study part- or full-time. However, unlike F-1 visa holders, they may not work on campus, although they may still be authorized for Curricular Practical Training; Optional Practical Training may only be used after graduation. While the Border Commuter Student Act was signed into law on November 2, 2002, the Department of Homeland Security, which is responsible for all F and M regulations (8 CFR 214.2), has never published a rule discussing F-3 commuter students. Previously, part-time students from Canada and Mexico were permitted to enter the United States as visitors, but after the September 11 attacks the Department of Homeland Security found such students ineligible for admittance as visitors (since their purpose was educational) and also ineligible for F-1 (academic) or M-1 (non-academic or vocational) visas (because those classifications require students to attend full-time).

== Role of the educational institution ==
To pursue studies in F status at a college, university, or vocational school, it is necessary that the institution be a participant in the Student and Exchange Visitor Program (SEVP). An institution can acquire SEVP certification by filing Form I-17 with U.S. Immigration and Customs Enforcement (this is a one-time process). An institution can be SEVP-certified despite not holding national or regional accreditation. Conversely, an institution may hold national or regional accreditation but may have chosen not to obtain SEVP certification if it does not intend to admit international students in the F, J, or M status.

A large university typically has an international office that manages its participation in the SEVP, and all the designated school officials (DSOs) work for this office. The international office manages updates to the Student and Exchange Visitor Information System (SEVIS) record for students and issuing of new Form I-20s. Students who have any change to their plans (such as program end date, course load, leave of absence, return from leave of absence) must communicate these changes with their international office.

=== High schools ===
It is possible to obtain an F-1 visa to pursue studies at a secondary school (grades 9-12). As is the case with other institutions, the secondary school must be SEVP-certified. The school may be a public (government-funded) school or a private school. In the case of a public school, the student may attend for a maximum period of 12 months and must reimburse the school for the full per-capita cost of attendance. Neither of these requirements apply for students attending private schools.

== Acquiring student status ==
=== Issuance of first Form I-20 ===
Once the prospective student has accepted the institution's offer of admission, the institution issues a Form I-20 to the student.

Apart from biographical information about the student (including the student's name, date of birth, citizenship, etc.), there are two main pieces of information that must be entered in the student's SEVIS record and the initial Form I-20.

- Program details: The program name, start date, and end date.
- How the student intends to meet tuition and living expenses for the first year the student is in the program, or until the end date indicated on the I-20, whichever is shorter.

Each international office may follow its own rules or guidelines regarding the type of documentation it requests from the student or from other departments in order to be able to issue the I-20. The jargon used for this documentation will also vary by institution. For instance, the University of Chicago and University of Michigan uses the term "Financial Resources Statement" for the statement that students need to submit to it regarding how they will meet their expenses, while the University of Illinois at Urbana–Champaign uses the term "Declaration & Certification of Finances for I-20/DS-2019 Application".

After receiving information from the student and institution regarding the program length and end date, the international office creates the student's SEVIS record, gets a SEVIS number for the student, and issues a Form I-20. A physical copy of the form may be mailed to the student overseas. In the case that the student has a SEVIS record from previous student status, the existing SEVIS record should be transferred.

The international office may refuse to issue a Form I-20 if the student is unable to demonstrate how he or she plans to cover expenses for the first year.

=== Payment of fees ===
In order to transition to student status, the prospective student must pay a one-time SEVIS fee using Form I-901. This fee applies both to people who are not currently in the United States (and need a visa) and to those who plan to change status using Form I-539.

=== Application ===
The application process for a F visa varies depending upon whether the student is outside of the United States, or already present within the United States.

==== Application from Outside of the US ====
Student who are outside of the United States, must apply for a student visa (F or M). The visa interview must be scheduled fewer than 120 days prior to the start date indicated on the Form I-20.

At the time of initial entry, the officer at the port of entry checks that the program start date is at most 30 days ahead, and that the I-20 has a valid travel signature. It is also necessary that, at the time of initial entry, the school the student intends to attend matches the school on the student's visa and the student's I-20, though this is not a requirement in the future. The officer at the port of entry also issues a Form I-94 with expiration date indicated as "D/S" (Duration of Status), which means that the student is in authorized status in the United States until the program end date indicated on the I-20 (and can stay in the United States for up to 60 days after that).

==== Change of status from within the US ====
If the student is already in the United States in another status, it may be possible to change status using Form I-539. However, there are many limitations. For instance, the process generally takes 3–6 months, which can be considerably longer than traveling outside the United States and getting a new visa.

For those who entered the United States using a B visa, having an annotation on the visa saying that the entrant is a "Prospective Student" is generally a prerequisite for the Form I-539 application to be accepted.

In general, the USCIS does not approve transition to student status with a start date more than 30 days prior to the program start date. Therefore, applications where the applicant's current status expires more than 30 days before the start date of their program are likely to be rejected.

=== Transfer to another institution ===
Students who transfer from one educational institution to another do not need to file Form I-539 or pay the SEVIS fee again. They can also re-enter on a student visa for a previous institution as long as the visa is still valid.

=== Reporting arrival ===
In order to maintain legal student status, the student is required to report to the international office at his/her institution about his/her successful arrival, along with all the relevant documentation (Form I-20, passport, visa, Form I-94). The international office in turn updates the student's SEVIS record indicating that the student has reported for studies.

== Maintaining student status ==
=== "D/S" annotation on Form I-94 ===
The Form I-94 that is issued to F-1 students upon arrival is generally annotated "D/S" indicating duration of status, which means that the student can stay in the United States as long as they are in valid student status. In addition, there is a grace period of 60 days after the completion of studies to depart the United States.

The exception to "D/S" is in cases where the student's documentation is not considered complete or satisfactory by the officer at the port of entry. In this case, the expiration date on the Form I-94 is listed as thirty days from the present date, and the student is issued Form I-515A, indicating what information was missing from the student's documentation. The student must contact his or her international office for help with obtaining the correct documentation.

=== Conditions for being in valid student status ===
Under ordinary conditions (i.e., unless any exceptions apply) a student must, in order to maintain valid student status:

- maintain a "full course load" (unless the institution approves the student for a Reduced Course Load)
- not be engaged in any employment without authorization of Department of Homeland Security
- have an accurate SEVIS record, and in particular, should not be past the program end date indicated on the Form I-20.

==== Full course load requirement ====
The SEVIS regulations stipulate one requirement for staying in status as being that the student must maintain a full course load, defined as 12 or more credit hours for credit-bearing schools and 18 or more contact hours for intensive English program enrollment. However, the precise translation of the requirement in terms of the structure of courses at a particular institution may vary by institution.

The following are the accepted reasons for having a reduced course load in a given quarter or semester:

- Final quarter or semester, where only a partial course load is needed to meet graduation requirements (this can be availed at most one time)
- Medical condition (this can be availed at most four times)
- Academic difficulty (this can be availed at most one time). Three types of reasons are allowed:
  - Initial difficulty with the English language or reading requirements
  - Unfamiliarity with U.S. teaching methods
  - Improper course level placement

Reduced Course Load must be applied for in advance so that the SEVIS record can be updated and a new Form I-20 noting the Reduced Course Load can be issued.

On August 27, 2002, an Interim Final Rule was issued extending Reduced Course Load to border commuter students (one of the measures that was part of the introduction of the F-3 status); this was a complementary measure to the phasing out of the use of B visas for study.

==== Employment ====
Unless approved for practical training, a person in student status may only engage in on-campus employment. On-campus employment may include:

- Employment by the institution, for instance, as a teaching assistant, research assistant, or library student worker
- Work performed in a location on campus for a commercial firm providing direct services to students, for instance, at a campus bookstore even if not owned by the university
- Employment at an off-campus location that is educationally affiliated with the institution. The work must be associated with the academic department's curriculum, related to contractually funded projects at the post-graduate level, and integral to the curriculum.

There are also limits on the amount of time a student may engage in on-campus employment. While school is in session, this can be no more than 20 hours per week. While school is out of session, there are no restrictions on the amount of work.

There are two primary ways a person in student status may be able to legally qualify for off-campus employment, namely Curricular Practical Training and Optional Practical Training. Both of these need to be approved by the institution and included in the student's SEVIS record and Form I-20. Within Optional Practical Training, there is both pre-completion and post-completion Optional Practical Training. OPT requires a recommendation from a designated school official (DSO) and an application to U.S. Citizenship and Immigration Services (USCIS). Students may not begin OPT until the start date listed on their Employment Authorization Document (EAD).

A student in F-1 status is not allowed to engage in on-campus employment during the 60-day grace period after completion of studies. Moreover, while the student is on post-completion Optional Practical Training, the student can only engage in the type of employment permitted by that Optional Practical training, and therefore cannot engage in arbitrary on-campus work.

An F-1 student who experiences severe economic hardship due to unforeseen circumstances beyond the student's control, the student may request employment authorization to work off-campus under certain circumstances. Examples of unforeseen circumstances that may be eligible include loss of financial aid due to no fault of the student, loss of on-campus employment through no fault of the student, substantial fluctuations in currency value or exchange rate, inordinate increases in tuition or living costs, unexpected changes in the financial condition of the student's source of support, and substantial unexpected medical bills. The student must have been in F-1 status for one full academic year, be a student in good standing, and be carrying a full course of study. Off-campus employment must not interfere with the student's full-time studies and the employment is necessary to avoid severe economic hardship. A student experiencing such a severe economic hardship due to unforeseen circumstances may request employment authorization by sending Form I-765, a copy of the student's Form I-20 including the employment page completed by the designated school official, and documentation of the severe economic hardship due to unforeseen circumstances to U.S Citizenship and Immigration Services. If U.S. Citizenship and Immigration Services approves the request, the student may work off-campus in one-year intervals up to the expected date of completion the student's current course of study.

Over and above the rules imposed on account of F student status, the student and employer must also comply with all existing federal, state, and local regulations pertaining to wages, working conditions, and tax law. For instance, the student may need to obtain a Social Security Number in order to be able to engage in on-campus work, and employers may ask the student to complete Form I-9 at the start of employment.

==== Leave of Absence and withdrawal ====
The F status does not explicitly recognize Leave of Absence. Rather, if somebody intends to take a lengthy leave of absence, then their institution terminates their SEVIS record for "Authorized Early Withdrawal". There is a 15-day grace period to depart the United States on such a terminated record. If the student then returns within 5 months, the F-1 status can be reactivated with the same I-20 and without any effect on OPT/CPT eligibility (this has a lead time of up to a month). If more than 5 months elapse, a new SEVIS record must be created for the student, with a new Form I-20.

Physical absence from the United States for a contiguous period of over five months automatically deactivates one's student status, even if the student did not explicitly request termination of the SEVIS record.

=== Maintaining the correct program end date ===
It may happen that the student's actual program end date falls earlier or later than what the student expected. It is necessary that a new I-20 be issued reflecting the current program end date, both prior to the program's actual end and prior to the stated program end date on the Form I-20.

If the Form I-20 is being shortened, the international office may require the student to submit evidence showing that the student has enough academic credits to graduate early. If the Form I-20 is being extended, then, in addition to any evidence from the student about changed academic plans, the international office also needs an updated statement of financial resources for the new I-20 to cover up to one year of the I-20 extension.

After the change to the program end date is made in the student's SEVIS record, the new Form I-20 is issued to the student.

The program end date on the Form I-20 need not coincide with the graduation date. Rather, it is the end date of the student's enrollment in courses. It is not possible to extend the program end date simply in order to be able to stay around till the graduation ceremony. If the graduation ceremony falls outside the 60-day grace period of completion of coursework, then the student must find some other way to be legally present for it (for instance, by staying around on Optional Practical Training, or getting a B visa for the graduation ceremony).

=== Travel and re-entry ===
Whenever the student re-enters the United States after traveling, the student must have all of these at the time of arrival at the port of entry:

- A valid passport (valid for at least six more months)
- A valid F or M visa
- A valid I-20 (i.e., an I-20 whose program end date has not yet arrived)
- A travel signature on the I-20 (page 3) from the DSO that is at most one year old (six months in the case of students currently on post-completion Optional Practical Training)

Since travel signatures are valid for only a year, students need to periodically get updated travel signatures on their I-20 from their international student office. The purpose of this requirement is to avoid cases where people who are no longer enrolled as students at an institution keep using an outdated Form I-20 to get in. In particular, when adding a new travel signature to the OPT, it is the responsibility of the international student office to make sure that the student is still enrolled at the institution. In case the Form I-20 runs out of space for travel signatures, the international office may print out a new Form I-20 for the student.

In the special case of automatic visa revalidation, whereby the student returns to the United States after a trip to Canada, Mexico, or a nearby island for at most 30 days, it is not necessary to have a valid visa at the time of re-entry. However, it is still necessary to have a valid Form I-20 and a travel signature.

=== After completion of studies ===
After completion of studies, a student has a 60-day grace period to depart the United States. It is not possible to re-enter the United States during this grace period, regardless of the validity of visa or travel signatures. This does give the student some time to change to another non-immigrant status if applicable. However, if the student is unable to successfully change status the student must nonetheless depart the United States.

One way a student can continue to stay in the United States on student status after completion of studies is by being approved for post-completion Optional Practical Training. Post-completion OPT can start at most 60 days after the completion of studies, and requires the student to work at least 20 hours a week (excluding up to 90 days of unemployment) on topics related to the student's program of study. Post-completion OPT can be at most 12 months long. While doing post-completion OPT, the student is still in F status but cannot engage in arbitrary on-campus employment or enroll in a degree program.

== Dependents ==
The status for dependents (spouses and children) of people on F-1 status is the F-2 status. Since the F-2 status is a derivative status, a person goes out of F-2 status as soon as the corresponding principal (the student in F-1 status) goes out of F-1 status.

The F-2 dependent may enter the United States along with the F-1 principal, or at any later time.

F-2 dependent spouses have a very limited range of activities they can legally do. In particular, they are not allowed to enroll in a full course of study (but they may still attend classes at a SEVP-certified school) and they are not allowed to work, and cannot obtain Social Security Numbers. This differs somewhat from J-2 spouses, who can take coursework and are also eligible for work authorization though they need to apply for it. If a person on F-2 status gets admitted to a degree program in the United States, that person can transition to F-1 status after obtaining a Form I-20 and then filing Form I-539. However, the person will need to a get a new visa for subsequent re-entry to the United States.

F-2 dependent minor children can study in school (K-12, i.e., secondary or lower level of education). If unmarried, the same permissions and restrictions apply to them for post-secondary education as apply to F-2 dependent spouses: they can take classes at a SEVP-certified school but cannot engage in a full course of study.

== Statistics ==
=== Number of visas issued from 1997 onward ===
The count below is of the number of visas issued by a United States consular officer. The years here are Fiscal Years, so for instance the year 2004 refers to the period from October 1, 2003 to September 30, 2004. This includes visas issued to people who are in an existing program of study and whose visa has expired, therefore it exceeds the actual number of distinct students admitted every year. On the other hand, since many students get multi-year, multi-entry visas, and a new visa needs to be issued only when the person travels outside the United States, this number is less than the total number of students in that status currently present in the United States. In other words, it is somewhere intermediate between the annual flow and total stock of students in F status. The F-3 became available in Fiscal Year 2004 so the number of F-3 visas issued before that is zero.

Fiscal Year	Number of F-1 visas issued	Number of F-2 visas issued	Number of F-3 visas issued	Ratio of F-2 visas to F-1 visas	Percentage growth in F-1 visas issued	Notes
1997	266,483	22,099	0	8.29%	no data	
1998	251,565	21,845	0	8.68%	-5.59%	
1999	262,542	22,893	0	8.71%	+4.36%	
2000	284,053	24,891	0	8.76%	+8.19%	
2001	293,357	26,160	0	8.94%	+3.27%	
2002	234,322	22,212	0	9.48%	-20.12%	(Note: Reduction in the number of student visas issued is due to tightening of security as a result of the September 11 attacks.)
2003	215,695	19,885	0	9.22%	-7.94%	(Note: Continued increase in security around September 11 attacks leads to further reductions in the issuance of new student visas.)
2004	218,898	18,893	16	8.63%	+1.48%	(Note: Number of F-1 visas issued no longer declining; also the F-3 category was introduced and started getting used.)
2005	237,890	18,061	42	7.59%	+8.67%	(Note: The number of F-1 visas starts increasing, and the ratio of F-2 to F-1 visas falls.)
2006	273,870	20,748	19	7.58%	+15.12%	
2007	298,393	22,036	119	7.38%	+8.95%	(Note: Number of F-1 visas issued reaches an all-time high, completing the recovery from the post-September 11 decrease.)
2008	340,711	23,193	519	6.81%	+14.18%	
2009	331,208	21,817	773	6.58%	-2.78%	(Note: In the wake of the Great Recession, growth in use of student visas stops temporarily.)
2010	385,210	25,220	887	6.55%	+16.30%	(Note: Robust year-over-year growth in usage of the F-1 resumes, even as the ratio of F-2 to F-1 continues to fall.)
2011	447,410	27,703	959	6.19%	+16.14%	
2012	486,900	27,561	792	5.66%	+8.82%	(Note: After steady growth, use of the F-3 starts declining.)
2013	534,320	29,139	678	5.45%	+11.58%	
2014	595,569	31,732	403	5.33%	+9.77%	
2015	644,233	33,632	63	5.22%	+8.17%	
2016	471,728	30,486	0	6.46%	-26.78%	(Note: The decline is mostly due to China, and likely due to the United States beginning to issue multiple-year entry visas to Chinese nationals starting with Fiscal Year 2015, reducing the need for visa renewals.)
2017	393,573	27,435	0	6.97%	-16.57%	
2018	362,929	26,650	0	7.34%	-7.79%	

=== F-1 visas by country for major countries ===
The data below is from the U.S. Department of State visa statistics.

A country where visas are issued for shorter durations and single entry will see more visa applications for the same total number of students in the United States. In particular, one of the main factors inflating the number of student visas issued to students from China was that the visa issued was a single-entry visa valid for one year, so a student visiting family every year had to renew the visa. The United States and China switched to a 5-year validity multiple-entry visa in November 2014 and the corresponding reduction in the number of F-1 visas issued should therefore be seen in the statistics starting Fiscal Year 2016 (since the first multi-entry five-year validity visas will be issued in Fiscal Year 2015, there will be less need for visa renewal starting in Fiscal Year 2016). In the table below, the columns are arranged in decreasing order of F-1 visa usage in FY 2015.

Year	Worldwide total of F-1 visas issued	Mainland China	India	Saudi Arabia	South Korea	Japan	Brazil	Taiwan
1997	266,483	11,909	10,532	3,529	36,188	35,157	12,293	14,794
1998	251,565	13,958	12,154	3,796	21,271	34,063	14,812	13,867
1999	262,542	16,303	15,286	3,893	20,883	33,762	13,985	14,709
2000	284,053	21,586	20,469	4,038	27,520	32,661	12,452	16,084
2001	293,357	25,218	24,106	4,359	28,977	32,237	12,524	24,106
2002	234,322	21,784	20,771	1,515	26,670	25,036	8,335	13,952
2003	215,695	16,169	19,152	1,158	28,695	24,825	7,066	11,490
2004	218,898	18,089	18,309	1,008	29,673	24,562	6,683	14,224
2005	237,890	21,642	20,173	2,166	35,310	24,554	5,845	15,488
2006	273,870	28,444	26,342	9,240	42,681	23,417	5,926	16,727
2007	298,393	39,535	34,471	5,776	45,915	21,900	7,418	14,973
2008	340,711	56,258	36,149	8,038	50,078	19,876	10,556	14,640
2009	331,208	81,842	26,890	11,193	39,040	16,423	9,160	10,978
2010	385,210	113,772	25,783	21,101	44,328	15,014	10,532	10,785
2011	447,410	153,026	25,649	27,738	45,638	16,811	14,408	11,200
2012	486,900	189,402	23,446	27,932	39,159	18,669	15,506	10,621
2013	534,320	217,593	36,141	28,597	33,584	18,837	14,890	9,921
2014	595,569	244,927	56,653	32,006	29,324	18,258	14,371	9,731
2015	644,233	274,460	74,831	28,171	27,324	17,203	14,344	9,791
2016	471,728	148,016	62,537	16,474	25,355	16,668	10,978	9,730
2017	393,573	112,817	44,741	11,414	22,856	15,982	12,178	9,117
2018	362,929	98,904	42,694	12,502	20,959	14,413	13,288	8,474

=== Detailed statistics for 2012 ===
In Fiscal Year 2012:

Type	Total Applicants	Issued	Refused	Waived or Overcome
F-1	657,714	486,900	170,814	64,829
F-2	39,237	27,561	11,676	5,759
F-3	895	792	103	86

=== IIE data on number of international students ===
The Institute of International Education maintains data on the number of international students as part of its Open Doors project, supported from a grant by the Bureau of Educational and Cultural Affairs in the U.S. Department of State. The data is collected through surveys of over 3,000 accredited U.S. higher education institutions, and does not rely on any privileged access to government data; in particular institutions not included in the survey (such as high schools that issue student visas, and non-accredited institutions that are SEVP-certified) may be omitted from the statistics. Open Doors surveys were started in 1949, but data presented here is mostly from 2000, which is what their free online portal has (some tables have additional data available for every fifth year from 1949-1950 to 1999-2000).

==== Data by country ====
This data differs from the data on F visas issued in the following respects:

- It gives the total number of students enrolled in studies, not the number of visas issued in a given year. For instance, a student who is in the United States in the third year of a four-year program, and only got a visa when initially admitted, will be counted here but not in the number of F-1 visas issued. This is the stock versus flow distinction.
- It includes students in statuses other than the F status. In particular, it includes students on the J-1 visa and the H-4 visa.
- The data is by academic year of enrollment rather than fiscal year of visa issuance. A visa to study in the academic year of 2013-14 would generally be issued in Fiscal Year 2013.

This table differs from the previous table:

- Mainland China continues to be the biggest single source of international students, but the gap is not as large as in the number of F-1 visas issued. The gap in the number of visas issued is larger because, until Fiscal Year 2014, Chinese students were issued one-year single-entry visas, thereby requiring more visas issued for re-entry than for most other countries that are leading sources of students to the United States.
- Canada figures prominently in this list, even though it is negligible in terms of F visas. The discrepancy is due to the fact that Canadian students in F status can enter the United States based on their I-20, without getting a F visa from their embassy or consulate.

Academic year	Total number of international students	Mainland China	India	South Korea	Saudi Arabia	Canada	Brazil	Taiwan	Japan
1949–1950	26,433	0	1,359	258	18	4,362	423	3,637	265
1954–1955	34,232	0	1,673	1,197	40	4,655	507	2,553	1,673
1959–1960	48,486	0	3,780	2,474	93	5,679	473	4,546	2,248
1964–1965	82,045	5	6,814	2,604	552	9,253	691	4,620	3,534
1969–1970	134,959	19	11,329	3,991	1,029	13,318	1,349	8,566	4,311
1974–1975	154,580	22	9,660	3,390	1,540	8,430	1,970	10,250	5,930
1979–1980	286,340	1,000	8,760	4,890	9,540	15,130	2,910	17,560	12,260
1984–1985	342,110	10,100	14,620	16,430	7,760	15,370	2,790	22,590	13,160
1989–1990	386,850	33,390	26,240	21,710	4,110	17,870	3,730	30,960	29,840
1994–1995	452,635	39,403	35,357	33,599	4,075	22,747	5,017	36,407	45,276
1999–2000	514,723	54,466	42,337	41,191	5,156	23,544	8,600	29,234	46,872
2000–2001	547,867	59,939	54,664	45,685	5,273	25,279	8,846	28,566	46,497
2001–2002	582,996	63,211	68,836	49,046	5,579	26,514	8,972	28,930	46,810
2002–2003	586,323	64,757	74,603	51,519	4,175	26,513	8,388	28,017	45,960
2003-2004	572,509	61,765	79,736	52,484	3,521	27,017	7,799	26,178	40,835
2004–2005	565,039	62,523	80,466	53,358	3,035	28,140	7,244	25,914	42,215
2005–2006	564,766	62,582	76,503	59,022	3,448	28,202	7,009	27,876	38,712
2006–2007	582,984	67,723	83,833	62,392	7,886	28,280	7,126	29,094	35,282
2007–2008	623,805	81,127	94,563	69,124	9,873	29,051	7,578	29,001	33,974
2008–2009	671,616	98,235	103,260	75,065	12,661	29,697	8,767	28,065	29,697
2009–2010	690,923	127,822	157,588	72,153	15,810	28,145	8,786	26,685	24,842
2010–2011	723,277	104,897	103,895	73,351	22,704	27,546	8,777	24,818	21,290
2011–2012	764,495	194,029	100,270	72,295	34,139	26,821	9,029	23,250	19,966
2012–2013	819,644	235,597	96,754	70,627	44,566	27,357	10,868	21,867	19,568
2013–2014	886,052	274,439	102,673	68,047	53,919	28,304	13,286	21,266	19,334
2014–2015	974,926	304,040	132,888	63,710	59,945	27,240	23,675	20,993	19,064
2015–2016	1,043,839	328,547	165,918	61,007	61,287	26,973	19,370	21,127	19,060

==== Data by country and academic level ====
The data below is only for the academic year 2015-2016. The version presented below includes only the top eight countries by the total number of students. The IIE website has more detailed information. Of these countries, India is unusual in having a much larger number of students at the graduate study level than the undergraduate study level, while Brazil and Saudi Arabia are unusual in having a large fraction of their students enrolled in non-degree programs.

Country	Total	Undergraduate	Graduate	Non-degree	Optional Practical Training
Mainland China	328,547	135,629	123,250	17,475	52,193
India	165,918	19,302	101,850	2,438	42,328
South Korea	61,007	32,695	16,613	4,660	7,039
Saudi Arabia	61,287	33,951	13,210	12,630	1,495
Canada	26,973	13,223	10,220	633	2,897
Brazil	19,370	6,990	4,308	6,751	1,321
Taiwan	21,127	6,358	9,164	1,588	4,017
Japan	19,060	9,285	3,125	5,234	1,416
Worldwide total	1,043,839	427,313	'383,935	85,093	147,498

== History ==
=== Early origins of the student visa program ===
Until the late 19th century, migration to the United States was relatively unrestricted, so that there was no special immigration status needed for students. However, the Carriage of Passengers Act of 1855 recognized a separate category for temporary immigrants, and the Chinese Exclusion Act, that excluded all Chinese skilled and unskilled laborers, carved out an exception for students. By 1913, U.S. Bureau of Education records indicated that 4,222 international students were enrolled in 275 U.S. universities, colleges, and technical schools; most of them were sent by foreign governments for education and training that would be useful when the students returned home.

The Institute of International Education was formed in 1919 to protect and promote the interests of international students and exchange visitors. Lobbying by the IIE led in 1921 to the classification of students as nonimmigrants and the creation of a separate nonimmigrant visa for students, thereby exempting students from the numerical quotas placed in the Emergency Quota Act of 1921 and the Immigration Act of 1924. Starting 1918, all noncitizens started being required to obtain visas prior to entry to the United States, and in 1924, Congress enacted a provision requiring consular officers to make a determination of admissibility prior to issuing a visa. As a result, starting around this time, the majority of noncitizens coming to the United States for study did so on student visas.

The letter "F" for student visas arose from the Immigration and Nationality Act of 1952. Title I, Section 15 of the Act used the letters A through I to specify the permitted nonimmigrant statuses, and the letter F was chosen for student status.

The Fulbright–Hays Act of 1961 created the J visa for exchange visitors; some students would use the J visa instead of the F visa. The Immigration and Nationality Act Amendments of 1981 created the M visa for people engaged in vocational (nonacademic) courses.

The F status was initially granted only one year at a time, so students in multi-year courses of study needed to renew their status every year. A regulation in 1978 switched F status to using "duration of status"; this was partially rolled back in 1981 and reinstated in 1983, with a further update in 1987.

=== Tightening of student visa requirements in the aftermath of the 1993 terrorist attacks and 1996 IIRIRA ===
In the 1993 World Trade Center bombing, a truck bomb was detonated below the North Tower of the World Trade Center in New York City. In the aftermath of this incident, the student visa came under increased scrutiny when it was discovered that Eyad Ismoil, one of the terrorists involved was in the United States on an expired student visa.

A memorandum from the U.S. Department of Justice's Office of Investigative Agency Policies to the Deputy Attorney General dated September 24, 1994, mentioned the need to subject foreign students to thorough and continuing scrutiny before and during their stay in the United States. On April 17, 1995, the Deputy Attorney General asked the INS Commissioner to address this issue. This led to the formation of an INS task force in June 1995 to conduct a comprehensive review of the F, M, and J visa processes. Besides the INS, the task force included members from the State Department and the United States Information Agency, and experts in the administration of international student programs. The task force report, issued on December 22, 1995, identified problems in the tracking and monitoring of students by schools, problems in the certification of schools by the INS, and problems with INS receiving and maintaining up-to-date records from schools. As a result of these findings, the Illegal Immigration Reform and Immigrant Responsibility Act of 1996 (IIRIRA) directed the Attorney General, in consultation with the Secretary of State, to develop and conduct a program to collect certain information on nonimmigrant foreign students and exchange visitors from approved institutions of higher education and designated exchange visitor programs.

In June 1997, the INS launched a pilot program for a centralized electronic reporting system for institutions, called the Coordinated Interagency Partnership Regulating International Students (CIPRIS). The CIPRIS pilot officially ended in October 1999, as the INS felt it had gathered enough data from the prototype to start working on the nationwide system. The INS began working on a new system that would be called the Student and Exchange Visitor Program (SEVP) with the associated information system called the Student and Exchange Visitor Information Service (SEVIS). During the rollout, CIPRIS and SEVIS met with considerable opposition from the Association of International Educators and the American Council on Education. However, they claimed that the opposition was not against the programs in principle but due to the concern that a botched rollout by the INS could result in many students suffering.

=== After 9/11: Adoption of SEVIS ===
In the aftermath of the September 11 attacks (September 11, 2001) and the Patriot Act passed in response (October 26, 2001), there was further increase in scrutiny of student visas, increasing the momentum in favor of the adoption of SEVIS. This was partly because one of the attackers, Hani Hanjour, had come to the United States on a student visa.

Below is a timeline of the key events in the two years after the attacks describing the key steps in the evolution of SEVIS:

Date	Type of action	Title and reference
October 26, 2001	Final legislation	Patriot Act; mandates implementation of Section 641 of the IIRIRA
May 16, 2002	Proposed rule	Retention and reporting requirements for F, J, and M nonimmigrants; Student and Exchange Visitor Information System
July 1, 2002	Interim final rule	Allowing eligible schools to apply for preliminary enrollment in SEVIS
September 11, 2002	Implementation deadline	The Interim Student and Exchange Authentication System (ISEAS), an interim program by the U.S. Department of State, comes into force. This is a temporary system put in place until SEVIS goes live.
September 25, 2002	Interim final rule	Requiring certification of all service-approved schools for SEVIS enrollment
December 11, 2002	Interim final rule	Retention and reporting of information for F, J, and M nonimmigrants; SEVIS
January 31, 2003	Implementation deadline	Mandatory SEVIS use begins

In August 2006, SEVIS would be used to identify Egyptian students who arrived in the United States for a one-month study program at Montana State University but failed to report for the program; most of the students would be apprehended by ICE and the FBI. A Congressional Research Service report would cite this as a claimed success of SEVIS as a recordkeeping system.

=== Study under B visa was no longer allowed, leading to increased reliance on F and M visas ===
Since some of the people involved with the September 11 attacks had originally entered on B visas but then taken courses at flight schools, the rules surrounding study by people on B visas were tightened. Previously, people on B visa could undertake short courses of study. An interim final rule passed on April 12, 2002 required anybody on a B visa to transition to a F or M visa prior to starting a program of study. Moreover, people on B status could transition using Form I-539 (i.e., change status while in the US) only if their visa had an annotation indicating that they might transition to student status.

=== Study of sensitive subjects and national security concerns ===
A Presidential Directive on May 7, 2002, called for the creation of the Interagency Panel on Advanced Science and Security (IPASS). The original intent of IPASS was to help with the evaluation of suspicious visa applications in subjects that had implications for national security.

A Technology Alert List (TAL) was originally created in November 2000, and subsequently expanded in August 2002. This list contained various types of technologies and domains of study that were particularly sensitive, whereby applicants for student visas in those domains of study received additional scrutiny. In addition it included a list of designated State Sponsors of Terrorism, countries from which visa applicants received additional scrutiny include countries with nuclear capability such as China, India, Israel, Pakistan, and Russia.

=== COVID-19 response ===
In March 2020, in two pieces of guidance issued in response to the COVID-19 pandemic in the United States, U.S. Immigration and Customs Enforcement (ICE) issued guidance temporarily modifying the Student and Exchange Visitor Program (SEVP). The guidance allowed students in F-1 or M-1 status to retain student status while staying in the United States if their school is temporarily closed due to COVID-19, and to maintain status by enrolling in courses online if their school switches coursework to online, whether inside or outside the United States.

On July 6, 2020, ICE partially rolled back the temporary modifications, with the rollback effective from the autumn (fall) of 2020. With the modified guidance, international students in F-1 or M-1 status must be enrolled in at least one in-person course in order to continue to stay in the United States; however, if their school is offering a hybrid of in-person and online coursework, they can take some courses online and count those toward credit requirements. Multiple lawsuits were filed by universities against ICE for this rollback. In response, ICE rescinded its July 6 order, thereby reinstating the full set of temporarily modifications made to the Student and Exchange Visitor Program (SEVP) in March 2020. On April 26, 2021, ICE announced that the guidance would continue to apply for the 2021-2022 academic year.

=== Interplay with college athletics NIL reform ===
At the start of the 2020s, several states, most notably California, passed legislation that would allow college athletes to monetize their name, image, and likeness (NIL). These moves have forced the hand of college governing bodies. The main U.S. governing body for college sports, the National Collegiate Athletic Association, implemented NIL reform for 2021–22, and the smaller National Association of Intercollegiate Athletics adopted the same in 2020. However, NIL reform carries with it serious implications for non-U.S. student-athletes that, according to multiple media reports, have yet to be addressed. Almost all non-U.S. student-athletes are on F visas, which carry with them a prohibition from earning any substantial income while in the U.S. with narrow exceptions that appear not to apply to income obtained from NIL. The P-1A visa, under which many professional athletes enter the U.S., does allow for NIL income, but ICE regulations state that it is issued "solely for the purpose of performing at a specific athletic competition", which would not account for also being a student. According to what in late 2021 was the NCAA's most recent report on international student participation, covering a period that ended with the 2018–19 school year, F visa holders made up 12.4% of NCAA Division I student-athletes in 2018–19, a percentage that had increased in each of the previous five years. That total masked dramatic variations from sport to sport. International students were less than 1% of D-I football players in 2018–19, but over 30% of D-I players in both men's soccer and women's golf, and over 60% of D-I tennis players. An immigration attorney interviewed for a June 2021 ESPN story suggested that the final outcome could be a court case in which an international student challenged NCAA rules barring that individual from NIL benefits, or ICE attempted to deport a college athlete for accepting NIL income.

A November 2021 story by the ESPN-owned web outlet FiveThirtyEight pointed out that the key distinction in whether an international student-athlete could profit from NIL deals is the type of visa the individual holds. Student-athletes who hold green cards, giving them the right to permanently live and work in the U.S., are able to fully profit from NIL deals, with the story specifically citing Jamaica-born Illinois All-American basketball center Kofi Cockburn as such an example. The story also noted that a significant number of the most marketable student-athletes from an NIL standpoint were international, specifically citing Nebraska basketball, in which the men's and women's players with the largest social media followings at the start of the 2021–22 season were respectively Keisei Tominaga from Japan and Jaz Shelley from Australia.

=== 2026 rule changes ===
Effective September 15, 2026, individuals who are approved for F-1 status will initially be given F-1 status for up to four years rather than the duration of their studies. If an individual in F-1 status wants to extend their status, they would need send an application to the Department of Homeland Security.

Effective the same date, an individual in F-1 status who complete their program will be eligible to start a different educational program at a higher level, but they will no longer be eligible to start one at the same or a lower academic level as the one they had completed.

Also effective the same date, an individual in F-1 status who completes their educational program or their post-completion practical training will be required to leave the US within 30 days of completion, reduced from 60 days previously.

== Comparison to other visas ==
=== M visa ===
The M visa shares a number of features with the F visa:

- Both statuses can only be granted for people enrolled with Student and Exchange Visitor Program (SEVP)-certified institution and begins with the institution issuing an I-20 to the student after the student is admitted to the program. The sequence of events (admission, I-20, visa application, entry and receipt of Form I-94) are similar for both statuses.
- For both, there is a principal status (F-1 and M-1 respectively) and a separate status for dependents (F-2 and M-2) that is contingent on the principal maintaining status.

However, there are a few differences:

- The F visa is for academic programs, whereas the M visa is for vocational programs.
- Students on M-1 visas are not permitted to engage in on-campus employment.
- For students entering on a F visa, the Form I-94 states the expiration date as "D/S" (Duration of Status) which means that the student may stay in the United States as long as the student is in student status. In particular, it suffices to get a new I-20 with a later expiration date. However, for M status, any extension of stay requires the filing of Form I-539 in addition to obtaining an updated Form I-20.
- F-1 students can engage in Curricular Practical Training and Optional Practical Training (both pre-completion and post-completion) whereas M-1 students can only engage in post-completion Optional Practical Training, and for a more limited duration.

=== J visa ===
The J-1 visa can be used by students in degree programs in some cases. Some similarities with the F status:

- Both the F and J statuses are part of the Student and Exchange Visitor Program, and can only be obtained for people enrolled with SEVP-certified institutions.
- In both cases, there is a principal status for the student (J-1) and a derivative status for the student's dependents (J-2).
- Both statuses allow for on-campus employment but for no other employment without authorization.
- Similar to the F status, students who enter on the J status get a "D/S" (Duration of Status) in their Form I-94, which means they can stay as long as their documentation is up to date without having to renew their visa.

There are some key differences:

- The J visa requires a sponsor. In some cases, the institution may itself agree to be a sponsor if it is covering the student's tuition. Otherwise, the student may be sponsored by his or her home country government, or through a scholarship program.
- The J visa program is overseen by the U.S. Department of State whereas the F visa program is overseen by U.S. Immigration and Customs Enforcement (ICE). However, both of them are managed through the Student and Exchange Visitor Program, which is a joint program of the Department of State and ICE.
- The document used to establish status for the J visa is DS-2019, whereas that for the F visa is the I-20.
- The J visa has a two-year home residence requirement. This says that, after completion of the exchange program, the exchange visitor must stay for at least two years in his or her home country before being able to return to the United States. The two-year residence requirement can be waived under some circumstances.
- The F visa has various options such as Curricular Practical Training and pre-completion and post-completion Optional Practical Training. The option available to J visa holders is called Academic Training.
- The grace period for J status holders after completion of the program is only 30 days, compared with 60 days for F status holders.

== Taxation ==
F-1 status holders may earn income through on-campus employment, scholarships, as well as Optional Practical Training and Curricular Practical Training. Generally speaking, they need to file tax returns reporting all such income and pay taxes. State income taxes may be applicable as well.

F-2 status holders cannot legally work in the United States, and therefore do not have any income tax obligations. However, they still need to file Form 8843, as discussed below.

=== Determination of whether the student is a resident or a nonresident for tax purposes ===
There are two tests to determine permanent residency: the Green Card Test and the Substantial Presence Test. Almost everybody in student status is likely to fail the Green Card Test since it applies only to people who have held a green card in the tax year. The relevant test for students is therefore the Substantial Presence Test. If an individual is a resident for tax purposes, then worldwide income is reported and taxed. Residency for tax purposes and immigration purposes may differ for an individual.

By the Substantial Presence Test, a person who is in the United States for at least 31 days in the current year and for a weighted total of at least 183 days in the past three calendar years (using a weighting formula) is a resident for tax purposes. However, one can exclude up to five calendar years in F status from this calculation. In particular, people who are arriving in the United States for the first time in F status can file as nonresidents for tax purposes for the first five years. However, those who have been in the United States recently in other statuses may need to file as residents for tax purposes due to their past presence.

Those who are classified as residents for tax purposes need to file Form 1040, 1040A or 1040EZ. Those who are classified as nonresidents for tax purposes need to file Form 1040NR or 1040NR-EZ.

=== Wages ===
Income earned through on-campus part-time or full-time employment is generally classified as wages. In order to be able to earn wages, the student needs to obtain a Social Security Number and fill Form I-9 and Form W-4 for the employer, just like United States workers. The employer issues a Form W-2 at the end of the year documenting the total income and withheld federal and state taxes. This total amount across all employers is filled in by the student on Line 7 of the Form 1040 (if a resident for tax purposes) or Line 8 of Form 1040NR (if not).

Nonresidents in F status are not required to pay Social Security or Medicare taxes for employment that falls within their status, including both on-campus employment and employment through Curricular Practical Training and Optional Practical Training.

Residents for tax purposes are also exempt from Social Security and Medicare taxes for income earned where the employer is the educational institution, subject to a number of caveats. Residents do need to pay Social Security and Medicare taxes on both on-campus employment not by their university, as well as off-campus employment such as that undertaken as part of Curricular Practical Training and Optional Practical Training.

=== Scholarships ===
Tuition waivers that do not involve the student actually receiving money are not taxable and not reported as taxable. However, scholarships that involve the transfer of money to the student do need to be reported and taxed.

If the student is a nonresident for tax purposes, the scholarships are reported using Form 1042-S and tax is withheld at 14% if the student has a SSN or Individual Taxpayer Identification Number, and at 30% otherwise. The student must report the tax on Line 12 of the Form 1040NR and use it in calculating his or her tax liability. Many states do not require state tax withholding on scholarship income.

If the student is a resident for tax purposes, there is no federal or state tax withholding, and no form need be issued to the student. However, the student is still obliged to report the income in Line 7 of the Form 1040, and it is part of the student's taxable income.

=== Contract work ===
A student may engage in work as an independent contractor only if it fits the definition of on-campus employment (while the student is enrolled) or either Optional Practical Training or Curricular Practical Training (during the time period of the training). There are two cases:

- The student is a nonresident for tax purposes: In this case, the payer is required to withhold federal taxes (14% if the student has an ITIN/SSN, 30% otherwise) and issue a Form 1042-S. The student needs to file Schedule C and report the income on Line 13 of Form 1040NR; or
- The student is a resident for tax purposes: In this case, if the payer is a business, and the amount paid exceeds the $600 threshold, the payer must file Form 1099-MISC. Regardless of whether the student receives a 1099-MISC, the student must file Schedules C and SE and report the income on Line 12 of Form 1040, as well as relevant amounts on Lines 27 and 57.

=== Filing Form 8843 and other miscellanea ===
Resident aliens in F status are governed by the same tax filing rules as United States residents. In particular, they need to file taxes on their worldwide income (including interest income in non-US banks and financial instruments) and can take either the standard deduction or itemize their deductions.

A nonresident alien in F-1 or F-2 status need not file an income tax return if he or she has no US-source income, or if the withholding on the US-source income covers the alien's tax obligations, subject to various caveats.

Any person in F-1 or F-2 status, who is a nonresident for tax purposes during a calendar year, and is not filing an income tax return, must file a standalone Form 8843 by June 15 of the next year. Since people in F-2 status cannot legally earn income in the United States, they would generally need to file the standalone Form 8843.

Some countries have tax treaties with the United States that allow for a reduction in the taxes that nonresidents in F status from these countries need to pay while in the United States.

== See also ==
- List of United States dependent visas
- Visa policy of the United States
