= Qualifying recognised overseas pension scheme =

Meets requirements set by British HM Revenue and Customs

A qualifying recognised overseas pension scheme, or QROPS is an overseas pension scheme that meets certain requirements set by HM Revenue and Customs (HMRC). A QROPS can receive transfers of British pension benefits. The QROPS programme was part of British legislation launched on 6 April 2006 as a direct result of EU human rights requirements of the freedom of capital movement.

A QROPS should not incur an unauthorised payment nor scheme sanction charge and is deemed either a trust or a contract based offshore pension. As such the tax residence of the beneficial owner or beneficiaries is critical as some countries do not recognise trusts, the result being the prospect of taxation at source or upon receipt. Examples could include France and the United States.

A QROPS can be appropriate for British citizens who have left the UK to emigrate permanently and intend to retire abroad having built up a British pension fund. Alternatively, a person who is born outside the UK having built up benefits in a UK-registered pension scheme can move their pension offshore if they want to retire outside the UK. British State Pensions cannot be transferred, but defined contribution, defined benefit pension schemes, SIPPs and SSAS can be transferred abroad. Originally, QROPS transfers within the European Economic Area (EEA) were exempt, but from 30 October 2024, this exemption was removed. You may be liable for the 25% Overseas Transfer Charge (OTC) if you transfer funds to a QROPS in the EEA or Gibraltar while living outside the UK, EEA, or Gibraltar unless you live in the same jurisdiction as the QROPS itself.

== Taxation ==
The critical issue in deciding how a QROPS is taxed internally on funds, and on payout, would be the double tax treaty between the country of residence of the beneficial owner (the pensioner or beneficiary) and the jurisdiction where the pension is based. Taxation can be affected by whether the country of residence of the beneficial owner recognises trusts or contract based pensions. For example, in France and Spain they apply tax on receipt of benefits such as the Pensions Commencement Lump Sum (commonly known as the tax free lump sum) which is no longer tax free. Some countries, such as the US, are covered further below.

HMRC states that:

Under section 150(8) a recognised overseas pension scheme is an overseas pension scheme that meets the following requirements prescribed under The Pension Schemes (Categories of Country and Requirements for Overseas Pension Schemes and Recognised Overseas Pension Schemes) Regulations 2006 (SI 2006/206). (Categories of Countries Regs) It must:

- be established in a Member State of the European Union, Norway, Liechtenstein or Iceland, India, and the United States.(HM Revenue and Custom’s legislation on these jurisdictions is regularly updated to monitor and improve the system – with non-conformity meaning a whole country can be de-listed.)
- be established in a country or territory with which the UK has a Double Taxation Agreement (DTA) that contains exchange of information and non-discrimination provisions - see the list in RPSM14101046 (there is more information on the provisions of particular Double Taxation Agreements in the Double Taxation Relief Manual), or
- satisfy the requirement that, at the time of the recognised transfer, the rules of the scheme provide that:
  - at least 70% of the funds transferred will be designated by the scheme manager for the purpose of providing the member with an income for life,
  - the pension benefits (and any associated lump sum) payable to the member under the scheme, to the extent that they relate to the transfer, are payable no earlier than they would be if pension rule 1 in section 165 applied, and
  - membership of the scheme is open to persons resident in the country or territory in which it is established.

Pension rule 1 in section 165 provides that no payment of pension may be made before the day on which the member reaches normal minimum pension age, unless the ill-health condition was met immediately before the member became entitled to a pension under the scheme.

QROPS are not approved by HMRC. A list of QROPS that have consented to have their names published is available on the HMRC website and is regularly updated.

In April and May 2012 HMRC introduced a new host of regulations that had the effect of shifting the jurisdictions in which QROPS could be established.

Guernsey had previously been the premier jurisdiction for QROPS, but due to a conflict between local legislation and HMRC regulations, over 300 schemes were de-listed. Any former pension transfers to Guernsey were "grandfathered" under the old QROPS rules, but any new transfers to Guernsey would have to be taxed at the same income tax rate as Guernsey locals.

This led to Gibraltar and Malta to become more popular QROPS destinations.

As an EU member state, Malta was at this time regarded as an attractive proposition for the industry. It currently has over 65 Double Taxation Agreements with other countries including EU member states. It has been proactive in the development of the QROPS market with the installation of local regulators to work with HMRC in order to ensure that all rules and procedures are adhered to.

Since the new regulations came into force, QROPS were also closed in Cyprus and are now principally available in Malta, the Isle of Man, New Zealand and Gibraltar.

A QROPS should operate broadly in line with British pension rules* ( See Spring Budget 2017 below ). A UK pension holder who has transferred their pension to a QROPS should be in a similar position as they would have been if the transfer had not taken place. What differentiates a QROPS from a UK-held pension is that it must be recognised as a pension scheme under the country's legislation where it resides while still complying with the rules set out by HMRC. As the jurisdiction's rules, where the pension resides, differ from UK rules, this leads to benefits available to the holder in comparison to a British pension scheme. Upon returning to the UK, a QROPS pension income will be treated as a foreign pension and will only be taxed on 90 per cent of its income; this loophole closed in April 2017.

QROPS may be useful in limited circumstances. For example

- Where sophisticated investors require non-standard and unregulated funds that would not be allowed in a British pension
- Certain jurisdictions where pension holders are resident, like Australia and New Zealand, that offer tax advantages
- For those approaching the age of 75, who want the whole fund disbursed in one payment to family upon their death, without tax (if the jurisdiction does not tax such benefits)

As the UK has a considerable number of Double Tax Treaties, thus allowing the payment of income to non-UK residents without tax deduction, there may be limited appeal for QROPS. QROPS themselves do not dictate the tax position; it is the Double Tax Treaty that determines how a pension is taxed.

The mid April 2015 update to the QROPS list resulted in the Qualifying tag being dropped. As such the list is now known as the Recognised Overseas Pension Schemes list. This was done to clarify that schemes appearing on the list may not be qualifying. Many Australian and New Zealand Kiwisaver schemes were delisted as they did not meet the new statutory instrument which dictates that an overseas pension scheme cannot be accessed before the UK retirement age.

In June 2015 British pensions legislation also introduced the requirement for anyone transferring their pension from a Defined Benefit pension scheme to have a Financial Conduct Authority (FCA) regulated pension transfer suitability report produced alongside professional advice from their country of residence.

QROPS schemes are required to report to HMRC any payments made to the member for at least ten years from the date that the transfer took place.

In April, 2015 an amendment to section 3 of the Categories of Countries Regs added what HMRC describes as the Pension Age Test; that

 [(6A)The benefits payable to the member under the scheme, to the extent that they consist of the member's relevant transfer fund, are payable no earlier than they would be if pension rule 1 in section 165 applied.]

This is a surprising addition as this requirement already appeared in section 2 (4) (b). It appears from the drafting of the amended regulation, that the department aimed this new requirement at the legal system of the host jurisdiction rather than at the deed governing the scheme, the rules of the scheme or the conduct of the scheme provider.

Also in April 2015, HMRC wrote to all QROPS schemes and asked them to declare in writing to HMRC how they met the Pension Age Test; whether under the law of the country where the scheme is established or to say that the rules of the scheme do not allow benefits from British tax relieved funds earlier than age 55 unless the member is retiring due to ill-health. 2015 HMRC guidance indicates that it is HMRC's view that the new section 6A may be read such that the Pension Age Test may be imposed by either of these methods.

The Kiwisaver Act 2006 (NZ) Schedule 1 sections 8 and 10 schemes require that members may withdraw to purchase a first home or in the case of significant financial hardship. A QROPS cannot allow purchases of residential property or allow access before the British pension age. So, HMRC's QROPS list published on 19 May 2015 included no Kiwisaver schemes and consequently a drastically reduced New Zealand list.

The changes introduced by HMRC April 2015 had a dramatic effect on many QROPS jurisdictions. In particular Australia which was at the time the largest QROPS jurisdiction, which saw this reduced to only one scheme, a scheme closed to public transfers. Entering 2016 Australia has seen a small number of additional schemes added to the HMRC ROPS list, however none is open to public transfers.

An important change also introduced in 2015 was the ability for QROPS to be able to offer Flexible Drawdown, in line with the change in British pension legislation. This was introduced but restricted to QROPS jurisdictions within the EU.

This has left main QROPS jurisdictions like the IOM and Gibraltar unable at this time to offer Flexible Drawdown. Malta was quick to capitalise on this, and became the first to offer Flexible Drawdown. It remains the only QROPS jurisdiction able to accommodate Flexible Drawdown at this time.

== Spring budget 2017 ==
As announced at the spring budget 2017, the government will legislate in the Finance Bill 2017 to apply a 25% tax charge to pension transfers made to QROPS. Exceptions will be made to the charge, allowing transfers to be made tax free where people have a genuine need to transfer their pension, where:

- both the individual and the pension scheme are in countries within the European Economic Area (EEA) or
- if outside the EEA, both the individual and the pension scheme are in the same country, or
- the QROPS is an occupational pension scheme provided by the individual's employer

If the individual's circumstances change within 5 tax years of the transfer, the tax treatment of the transfer will be reconsidered. The changes will take effect for transfers requested on or after 9 March 2017.

The government will also legislate in Finance Bill 2017 to apply British tax rules to payments from funds that have had British tax relief and have been transferred, on or after 6 April 2017, to a qualifying recognised overseas pension scheme. British tax rules will apply to any payments made in the first 5 full tax years following the transfer, regardless of whether the individual is or has been a UK resident in that period.

The qualifying recognised overseas pension schemes: charge on transfers TIIN was published on 8 March 2017.

== International SIPPs ==
Due to the imposition of the Overseas Transfer Charge and the removal of the Lifetime Allowance Charge, International SIPPs have become more popular for those that hold UK pension funds and who move abroad. An International SIPP is a UK registered pension, this is the same as a standard SIPP, except that it accepts non-UK residents and often has multi-currency options.

== Concerns about QROPS transfers for US residents ==
There have been increasing concerns about using QROPS for residents of the US since 2013. Several IRS enquiries have led to many US accountants, as well as UK / US pension experts, ruling such transfers out. It has also led to the receiving QROPS trustees asking beneficial owners (the pension holders) resident in the US to sign waivers absolving the QROPS trustees of all liability, as the transfer of British pensions to third-party countries like Malta, Gibraltar and the Isle of Man are not considered as eligible rollover distributions. The IRS has made it clear that such transfers could be taxable.

Note: Under US tax code and the double taxation agreement, a transfer from a UK-registered pension to another UK-registered pension is deemed to be qualifying. IRS Memorandum AM 2008-009 ( 21 August 2008 ) under Section 402(c)(4) means that with relation to tax, a transfer from a UK-registered pension outside of the original state (the UK) is not an "eligible rollover distribution". In fact it is seen in the same light as a transfer from a UK-registered pension into the US itself, which is also not qualifying and therefore taxable.

Some experts also argue that under US legislation a trust arrangement means that funds are taxable within the QROPS themselves.

Concerns were confirmed by an SEC announcement on 4 June 2018 that referred to incorrect tax information being provided to US residents about the benefits of QROPS, as well as failings to disclose commissions to investors. This resulted in the firm paying an 8 million dollar settlement and a court complaint against two of the local management.

== Regulated advice ==
Professional advisers and British regulators have been increasingly concerned about the quality of advice given by unregulated QROPS advice firms operating outside the UK. A QROPS as a trust means that it is not a regulated product. However, investment advice about the funds within the trust should only be given by a firm with the appropriate investment licences for the jurisdiction in which the investor is resident. As a result, the regulators have made several statements.

On 24 January 2017, the FCA issued its most recent warning to the public about inappropriate advice being given to expats about transfers to QROPS. Care should be taken to avoid firms that operate outside of the regulatory framework or those that only have licences to sell insurance-based wrappers and sometimes unregulated funds, all of which are not allowed in the British pension system.

Malta

The Pension Rules for Personal Retirement Schemes came into effect in Malta on 1 July 2019, meaning that advisers working with clients based on the island must be regulated in the jurisdiction. This means that anyone who has previously transferred their British pension into a qualifying recognised overseas pension scheme (Qrops) in Malta has to ensure that their adviser is correctly registered in Malta so they can continue to advise them.

Correct registration will mean that the adviser must comply with MiFIDII (EU) regulations and hold an investment licence that covers where the client lives and Malta. For advisers outside of the EU, they must hold investment licences of an equivalent nature to MiFIDII, as well as being registered where the client resides.

== See also ==
Qualified Non-UK Pension Scheme
