= Physical presence test =

In international taxation, a physical presence test is a rule used to determine tax residence of a natural or legal person. It may rely on having a place of business in the jurisdiction (for legal persons), or remaining in or out of the jurisdiction for a certain number of days each year (for natural persons).

== Australia ==
The "physical presence in Australia test" is one of the three tests under Australian law through which a charitable institution may be entitled to the income tax-exempt charity endorsement; the others are the "deductible gift recipient test" and the "prescribed by law" test. The two elements of the test are whether the institution has a physical presence in Australia (wholly or through a division, branch, or subdivision) and whether or not the expenditures of an institution are incurred principally in Australia. An institution may still qualify even if its expenditure is not incurred principally in Australia, provided that the amounts expended elsewhere are less than "disregarded amounts" (comprising gifts, proceeds from fundraising activities and government grants).

== South Africa ==
The South Africa Income Tax Act (No. 58 of 1962) in Section 1 defines a natural person as a "tax resident" if he is either ordinarily resident in South Africa, or meets the physical presence test. A natural person meets the physical presence test if he is present for more than 91 days during the year of assessment, as well as more than 91 days in each of the five preceding years, or if he was present for more than 915 days in aggregate in the preceding five years.

However, a person who is absent from South Africa for more than 330 days after his previous day of presence is deemed not to have been a tax resident since that day. Furthermore, a person who meets the physical presence test may still be deemed not to be a tax resident of South Africa if he is a tax resident of a country with which South Africa has a tax treaty for the avoidance of double taxation.

== United States ==
The United States uses a physical presence test both when determining the eligibility of US citizens and permanent residents for favorable tax treatment for not being physically present in the US under the foreign earned income exclusion and conversely when determining when people who are not citizens or permanent residents are subject to US taxation. The former is covered in this section; the latter is covered in the article on the Substantial Presence Test.

=== Overview ===
One of the ways for US taxpayers to qualify for the foreign earned income exclusion is by passing the physical presence test (the other being the bona fide resident test). Meeting the test requires the taxpayer to be physically present in another country for at least 330 full days during any period of 12 consecutive months. Because this is a quantitative test based on the numerical number of days, rather than a subjective test requiring proof of roots in a foreign country, it is particularly popular with digital nomads. An exception is available in the event of war or civil unrest that causes the taxpayer to leave. A less-than-24-hour visit to the US during travel between two points outside the US does not count as a break in a foreign stay.

=== Determination of 12-month period ===
Four rules determine a 12-month period for the purposes of the physical presence test:

1. A 12-month period must be made up of consecutive months.
2. A 12-month period may begin on any day of any month.
3. The period does not begin until the first full day abroad.
4. The 12-month periods may overlap.

A person who is present in the United States, rather than abroad, may still meet the physical presence test under the war and civil unrest exception. The Internal Revenue Service publishes a list of countries that qualify under the war/civil unrest exception and the respective dates during which the waiver applies. Conversely, days spent in a foreign country by a person who is present there in violation of a US ban on travel to that country do not qualify for meeting the physical presence test (or the bona fide residence test). Income earned there does not qualify for the foreign earned income exclusion, and housing expenditures incurred there do not qualify for the foreign housing deduction. As of 2010, the only country in that category was Cuba (except the Guantanamo Bay corrections facility).

=== Foreign earned income ===
Income earned abroad may qualify for the foreign earned income exclusion, the foreign housing exclusion or deduction, as long as the income is earned in the taxpayer's tax home and the taxpayer meets either the bona fide resident test or the physical presence test.

The income requirements for US citizens and resident aliens living abroad are the same. However, foreign earned income may qualify for some amount of exclusion. One is to subtract the amounts that are estimated from the foreign earned income exclusion. Tax obligations may be reduced by subtracting the foreign housing exclusion but only from non-excluded income by using tax rates that would apply if the income were included under the stacking rule.
