= Qualified Non-UK Pension Scheme =

A Qualifying Non-UK Pension Scheme (QNUPS) is a form of overseas pension scheme available to British citizens that reside permanently outside of the United Kingdom or who reside in the United Kingdom. If the QNUPS complies with specific HMRC regulations, it will be recognised as a QROPS (Qualifying Recognised Offshore Pension Scheme) which allow individuals to transfer UK based approved pension assets to an overseas based "QROPS". A QNUPS can also allow individuals to invest more into their pensions than the usual UK limit in terms of both annual contributions and overall 'lifetime limit' of fund size

The scheme was introduced by HM Revenue and Customs on 15 February 2010 but became effective from 6 April 2006. The primary benefit of QNUPS is that the scheme allows the holder of the scheme to greatly reduce or eliminate inheritance tax. A QNUPS also has the advantages of being widely available and having no maximum limit or age for contributions.

In order for a pension scheme to be recognised as a QNUPS it must meet strict HMRC guidelines. This requires companies providing QNUPS to reveal certain information to HMRC. Individuals wishing to transfer pension assets to a QNUPS must have been resident in the UK for tax purposes when the payment was being made or treated as being made. If they are not resident for tax purposes, then they should be resident in the UK in the year the tax payment was made or in any of the five previous tax years.

In order for a pension scheme to be considered a QNUPS it must meet the following criteria:

- The scheme must have the same retirement age as would apply in the United Kingdom
- It must only provide income after retirement
- It must be available to the local population in the jurisdiction in which it is located
- It must be recognised for tax purposes in the jurisdiction in which it is located

Qualifying registered overseas pension schemes (QROPS) are by definition QNUPS. ROPS (Recognised Overseas Pension Schemes) are also considered QNUPS as both have the same qualifying conditions. This in effect means that many of the guidelines governing QNUPS are similar to QROPS.

As such, QROPS and QNUPS are highly similar and related pension schemes. Which one is more appropriate for an individual depends on their financial circumstances and the country in which they are domiciled and/or resident. For example, expatriates that reside abroad but are domiciled in the UK would benefit from a QNUPS. Expatriates resident and domiciled overseas, but who also have UK based pension assets that they wish to transfer, would benefit more from a QROPS. Furthermore, QNUPS offer a wider range of asset classes than QROPS.
