= Double taxation =

Levying of compulsory charges on the same thing by two different jurisdictions

Double taxation is the levying of tax by two or more jurisdictions on the same income (in the case of income taxes), asset (in the case of capital taxes), or financial transaction (in the case of sales taxes).

Double liability may be mitigated in a number of ways, for example, a jurisdiction may:

- exempt foreign-source income from tax,
- exempt foreign-source income from tax if tax had been paid on it in another jurisdiction, or above some benchmark to exclude tax haven jurisdictions, or
- fully tax the foreign-source income but give a credit for taxes paid on the income in the foreign jurisdiction.

Jurisdictions may enter into tax treaties with other countries, which set out rules to avoid double taxation. These treaties often include arrangements for exchange of information to prevent tax evasion – such as when a person claims tax exemption in one country on the basis of non-residence in that country, but then does not declare it as foreign income in the other country; or who claims local tax relief on a foreign tax deduction at source that had not actually happened.

The term "double taxation" can also refer to the taxation of some income or activity twice. For example, corporate profits may be taxed first when earned by the corporation (corporation tax) and again when the profits are distributed to shareholders as a dividend or other distribution (dividend tax).

There are two types of double taxation: jurisdictional double taxation, and economic double taxation. In the first one, when source rule overlaps, tax is imposed by two or more jurisdictions as per their domestic laws in respect of the same transaction, income arises or deemed to arise in their respective jurisdictions. In the latter one, when same transaction, item of income or capital is taxed in two or more states but in hands of different person, double taxation arises.

== International double taxation agreements ==
It is not unusual for a business or individual who is resident in one country to make a taxable gain (earnings, profits) in another country. It could happen that a person will need to pay tax on that income locally and also in the country in which it was made. The stated goals for entering into a treaty often include reduction of double taxation, eliminating tax evasion, and encouraging cross-border trade efficiency. It is generally accepted that tax treaties improve certainty for taxpayers and tax authorities in their international dealings.

A DTA (double tax agreement) may require tax to be levied by the country of residence, and be exempt in the country in which it arises. In other cases, the resident may pay a withholding tax to the country where the income arose, and the taxpayer receives a compensating foreign tax credit in the country of residence to reflect the fact that tax has already been paid. In the former case, the taxpayer would declare himself (in the foreign country) a non-resident. In either case, the DTA may provide that the two taxation authorities exchange information about such declarations. Because of this communication between the countries, they also have a better view on individuals and companies who are trying to avoid or evade tax.

South Africa maintains double taxation agreements (DTAs) with several countries, offering relief mechanisms such as tax credits and exemptions for foreign income.

Individuals ("natural persons") can only be resident for tax purposes in one country at a time. Corporate persons, owning foreign subsidiaries, can be based in one country and simultaneously based in another country: a subsidiary may make substantial income in one country but remit that income (as license fees, for example) to a holding company in another country that has a lower rate of corporation tax. Because of this, the control of unreasonable tax avoidance of corporations becomes more difficult and it requires more investigation when goods, rights and services are transferred.

=== Double taxation relief ===
Countries may reduce or avoid double taxation either by providing an exemption from taxation (EM) of foreign-source income or providing a foreign tax credit (FTC) for tax paid on foreign-source income.

The EM method requires the home country to collect the tax on income from foreign sources and remit it to the country where it arose. Tax jurisdiction extends only to the national border. When countries rely on territorial principle as described above, they usually depend on the EM method to relieve double taxation. But the EM method is only common for certain income classes or sources, such as international shipping income.

The FTC method is used by countries that tax (individual or corporate) residents on income, irrespective of where it arises. The FTC method requires the home country to allow credit against domestic tax liability where the person or company pay foreign income tax.

Another solution used is 'relief provision'. They create more favorable terms for multinational companies to (remain) based in countries that use less effective measures than the EM or FTC method.

== European Union ==
In the European Union, member states have concluded a multilateral agreement on information exchange. This means that they will each report (to their counterparts in each other jurisdiction) a list of those people who have claimed exemption from local taxation on grounds of not being a resident of the state where the income arises. These people should have declared that foreign income in their own country of residence, so any difference suggests tax evasion.

(For a transition period, some states have a separate arrangement. They may offer each non-resident account holder the choice of taxation arrangements: either (a) disclosure of information as above, or (b) deduction of local tax on savings interest at source as is the case for residents).

A 2013 study by Business Europe says that double taxation remains a problem for European MNEs and an obstacle for cross border trade and investments. In particular, the problematic areas are limitation in interest deductibility, foreign tax credits, permanent establishment issues and diverging qualifications or interpretations. Germany and Italy have been identified as the Member States in which most double taxation cases have occurred.

=== Cyprus ===
Cyprus has entered into a broad network of bilateral agreements for the avoidance of double taxation. These agreements allocate taxing rights between Cyprus and the relevant treaty country and may provide relief where the same income would otherwise be taxed in both countries.

=== Czech Republic – Korea DTA ===
In January 2018, a DTA was signed between Czech Republic and South Korea. The treaty eliminates double taxation between these two countries. In this case, a Korean resident (person or company) that receives dividends from a Czech company needs to balance the Czech dividend withholding tax but also the Czech tax on profits, profits of the company that pays the dividends. The treaty covers taxation of dividends and interest. Under this treaty, dividends that are paid to the other party will be taxed at the maximum of 5% of the total amount of dividend for legal entities as well as for individuals. This treaty reduces from 10% to 5% the limit for taxing paid interest. Copyrights to literature, works of art etc. still remain free from taxation. For patents or trademarks a maximum 10% tax rate is implied.

=== German taxation avoidance ===
If a foreign citizen is in Germany for less than a relevant 183-day period (approximately six months) and is tax resident (i.e., and paying taxes on his or her salary and benefits) elsewhere, then it may be possible to claim tax relief under a particular Double Tax Treaty. The relevant 183 day period is either 183 days in a calendar year or in any period of 12 months, depending upon the particular treaty involved.

So, for example, the Double Tax Treaty with the UK looks at a period of 183 days in the German tax year (which is the same as the calendar year); thus, a citizen of the UK could work in Germany from 1 September through the following 31 May (9 months) and then claim to be exempt from German tax. As the double taxation avoidance agreements will give the protection of income from some countries.

=== The Netherlands ===
Different factors such as political and social stability, an educated population, a sophisticated public health and legal system, but most of all the corporate taxation makes the Netherlands a very attractive country of doing business in. The Netherlands levies corporate income tax at a 25 per cent rate. Residents taxpayers are taxed on their worldwide income. Non-residents taxpayers are taxed on their income derived from Dutch sources. There are two sorts of double taxation relief in The Netherlands. Economic double taxation relief is available with regard to proceeds from substantial equity investments under the participation. Juridical double taxation relief is available for resident taxpayers having foreign source income items. In both situations there is a combined system in place which makes difference in active and passive income.

=== Hungary ===
Hungary is unique as it is the only non-developing country (the other, developing country being Eritrea, at a flat 2%) that considers all of its citizens tax residents, and provides no personal allowance (such as the US foreign earned income exclusion) – income is taxed from the first penny earned.

While double taxation agreements do provide for relief from double taxation, Hungary only has some 73 of them in place. This means that Hungarian citizens receiving income from the 120-odd countries and territories that Hungary has no treaty with will be taxed by Hungary, regardless of any tax already paid elsewhere.

== India ==
India has comprehensive double taxation avoidance agreement with 88 countries, out of which 85 have entered into force. This means that there are agreed rates of tax and jurisdiction on specified types of income arising in a country to a tax resident of another country. Under the Income Tax Act 1961 of India, there are two provisions, Section 90 and Section 91, which provide specific relief to taxpayers to save them from double taxation. Section 90 (bilateral relief) is for taxpayers who have paid the tax to a country with which India has signed double taxation avoidance agreements, while Section 91 (unilateral relief) provides benefit to tax payers who have paid tax to a country with which India has not signed an agreement. Thus, India gives relief to both kinds of taxpayers. The rates differ from country to country.

Example of double taxation avoidance agreement benefit: Suppose interest on NRI bank deposits attracts 30 per cent tax deduction at source in India. Since India has signed double taxation avoidance agreements with several countries, tax may be deducted at only 10 to 15 per cent instead of 30%.

In case of any conflict between the provisions of the Income Tax Act or double taxation avoidance agreement, the provisions of the latter prevail.

A large number of foreign institutional investors who trade on the Indian stock markets operate from Singapore and the second being Mauritius. According to the tax treaty between India and Mauritius, capital gains arising from the sale of shares are taxable in the country of residence of the shareholder and not in the country of residence of the company whose shares have been sold. Therefore, a company resident in Mauritius selling shares of an Indian company will not pay tax in India. Since there is no capital gains tax in Mauritius, the gain will escape tax altogether.

The Protocol for amendment of the India-Mauritius Convention signed on 10 May 2016, provides for source-based taxation of capital gains arising from alienation of shares acquired from 1 April 2017 in a company resident in India. Simultaneously, investments made before 1 April 2017 have been grandfathered and will not be subject to capital gains taxation in India. Where such capital gains arise during the transition period from 1 April 2017 to 31 March 2019, the tax rate will be limited to 50% of the domestic tax rate of India. However, the benefit of 50% reduction in tax rate during the transition period shall be subject to the Limitation of Benefits Article. Taxation in India at full domestic tax rate will take place from financial year 2019–20 onwards.

The revised double taxation avoidance agreement between India and Cyprus signed on 18 November 2016, provides for source based taxation of capital gains arising from alienation of shares, instead of residence based taxation provided under the double taxation avoidance agreement signed in 1994. However, a grandfathering clause has been provided for investments made prior to 1 April 2017, in respect of which capital gains would continue to be taxed in the country of which taxpayer is a resident. It also provides for assistance between the two countries for collection of taxes and updates the provisions related to Exchange of Information to accepted international standards.

The India–Singapore double taxation avoidance agreement at present provides for residence based taxation of capital gains of shares in a company. The Third Protocol amends the agreement with effect from 1 April 2017 to provide for source based taxation of capital gains arising on transfer of shares in a company. This will curb revenue loss, prevent double non-taxation and streamline the flow of investments. In order to provide certainty to investors, investments in shares made before 1 April 2017 have been grandfathered subject to fulfillment of conditions in Limitation of Benefits clause as per 2005 Protocol. Further, a two-year transition period from 1 April 2017 to 31 March 2019 has been provided during which capital gains on shares will be taxed in source country at half of normal tax rate, subject to fulfillment of conditions in Limitation of Benefits clause.

The Third Protocol also inserts provisions to facilitate relieving of economic double taxation in transfer pricing cases. This is a taxpayer friendly measure and is in line with India's commitments under Base Erosion and Profit Shifting (BEPS) Action Plan to meet the minimum standard of providing Mutual Agreement Procedure (MAP) access in transfer pricing cases. The Third Protocol also enables application of domestic law and measures concerning prevention of tax avoidance or tax evasion. Singapore's investment of $5.98 billion has over taken Mauritius's investment of $4.85 billion as the single largest investor for the year 2013–14.

== Australia ==
In principle, an Australian resident is taxed on their worldwide income, while a non-resident is taxed only on Australian-sourced income. Both legs of the principle may give raise to taxation in more than one jurisdiction. To avoid double taxation of income by different jurisdictions, Australia has entered into double taxation avoidance agreements (DTAs) with a number of other countries, under which both countries agree on which taxes will be paid to which country.

For example, the DTA with the United States provides that, in the case of royalties, the US will tax Australian residents at the rate of 5%, and Australia will tax it at normal Australian rates (i.e., 30% for companies) but give a credit for the 5% already paid. For Australian residents, this results in the same liability as if the royalties had been earned in Australia, while the US retains the 5% credit.

== United States ==
=== U.S. citizens and resident aliens abroad ===
In principle, United States citizens are liable to tax on their worldwide earnings, wherever they reside. However, some measures mitigate the resulting double tax liability. An individual who is a bona fide resident of a foreign country or is physically outside the United States for an extended time is entitled to an exclusion (exemption) of part or all of his earned income, i.e. personal service income, as distinguished from income from capital or investments. (See IRS form 2555.) If some income is not covered by this exclusion, foreign taxes paid on it can be claimed as a credit.

=== Double taxation within the United States ===
Double taxation can also happen within a single country. This typically happens when sub-national jurisdictions have taxation powers, and jurisdictions have competing claims. In the United States a person may legally have only a single domicile. However, when a person dies different states may each claim that the person was domiciled in that state. Intangible personal property may then be taxed by each state making a claim. In the absence of specific laws prohibiting multiple taxation, and as long as the total of taxes does not exceed 100% of the value of the tangible personal property, the courts will allow such multiple taxation.

Also, since each state makes its own rules on who is a resident for tax purposes, someone may be subject to the claims by two states on his or her income. For example, if someone's legal/permanent domicile is in state A, which considers only permanent domicile to which one returns for residency but he or she spends seven months of the year (say April–October) in state B where anyone who is there longer than six months is considered a part-year resident, that person will then owe taxes to both states on money earned in state B. College or university students may also be subject to claims of more than one state, generally if they leave their original state to attend school, and the second state considers students to be residents for tax purposes. In some cases one state will give a credit for taxes paid to another state, but not always.

=== Taxation of corporate dividends ===
In the US, the term "double taxation" is sometimes used to refer to dividend taxation. This situation arises when corporate profits are considered to have been taxed twice: first when earned by the corporation (corporation tax) and again when the profits are distributed to shareholders or stockholders as a dividend or other distribution (dividend tax).

== China ==
In recent years, the development of overseas investment of Chinese enterprises is growing rapidly and has become rather influential. Thus, dealing with cross-border taxation matters turns into one of the significant financial and trade projects of China, and the problems of cross-border taxation is still increasing. In order to solve the problems, the multilateral tax treaties between countries, which can provide legal support to help enterprises from both sides with double taxation avoidance and tax issues solutions, are established. To fulfill the "going global" strategy of China and support the domestic enterprises to adapt to the globalization situation, China has been making efforts on promoting and signing multilateral tax treaties with other countries to achieve mutual interests. By the end of November 2016, China has officially signed 102 double taxation avoidance agreements. Out of which 98 agreements have already entered into force.

In addition, China signed double taxation avoidance arrangement with Hong Kong and Macau Special Administrative Region. China also signed double taxation avoidance agreement with Taiwan in August 2015, which has not entered into force yet. According to the Chinese State Administration of Taxation, the first double taxation avoidance agreement was signed with Japan in September 1983. The latest agreement was signed with Cambodia in October 2016. As for the situation of state disruption, China would continue the signed agreement after the disruption. For example, China first signed double taxation avoidance agreement with Czechoslovakia Socialist Republic in June 1987. In 1990, Czechoslovakia divided into two countries, Czech Republic and Slovakia Republic, and the initial agreement signed with Czechoslovakia Socialist Republic was continually used in two new countries. In August 2009, China signed the new agreement with Czech Republic. And when it comes to the special case of Germany, China continued using the agreement with The Federal Republic of Germany after two Germanys reunited. China have signed double taxation avoidance agreement with many countries. Among them, there are not only countries which have made large investment in China, but also countries which as well-relationship recipient of Chinese investment. As for the agreement quantity, China is now next only to United Kingdom. For those countries which have not signed the double taxation avoidance agreements with China, some of them signed information exchange agreements with China.

There are mainly four effects of signing Double Taxation Avoidance agreement.

1. Eliminate the double taxation, decrease the tax cost of "going global" enterprises.
2. Increase the certainty of taxation, decrease the risk of cross-border taxation
3. Decrease the tax burden of "going global" enterprises in the host country, improve the competitiveness of those enterprises.
4. When taxation disputes occur, the agreements can provide bidirectional consultation mechanism, solve the existed disputed problems.

Under general conditions, the tax rate under tax treaty is often lower than the domestic tax rate under the law of host country. Take Russia as an example, in Russia, the standard withholding tax rate of interest and royalty under domestic law is both 20%. According to the newest tax treaty China signed with Russia, the withholding tax rate of interest is 0 and the withholding tax rate of royalty is 6%. This can obviously reduce the tax cost of enterprises, increase the willing of "going global" and the competitiveness of domestic enterprises, and bring the goodness.

== See also ==
- Permanent establishment
- Tax equalization
