= Foreign earned income exclusion =

Tax reduction in the United States

The United States taxes citizens and residents on their worldwide income. Citizens and residents living and working outside the U.S. may be entitled to a foreign earned income exclusion that reduces taxable income. For 2026, the maximum exclusion is $132,900 per taxpayer (future years indexed for inflation). Taxpayers filing a joint return are entitled to up to two exclusions if both have earned income. In addition, the taxpayer may exclude housing expenses in excess of 16% of this maximum ($58.26 per day in 2026) but with limits.

The exclusion is available only for wages or self-employment income earned for services performed outside the U.S. The exclusion is claimed on IRS Form 2555.

== Qualification ==
Only individuals are eligible for the exclusion. To qualify for the exclusion, the taxpayer's tax home must be outside the U.S. In addition, the taxpayer must meet either of two tests:

- Bona fide resident test: the taxpayer was a bona fide resident of a foreign country for a period that includes a full U.S. tax year, or
- Physical presence test: the taxpayer must be physically present in a foreign country (or countries) for at least 330 full days in any 12-month period that begins or ends in the tax year in question.

The bona fide residence test is not available to a resident alien, unless he/she is a citizen or national of a country with which the United States has an income tax treaty in effect. Further, the test is not met if the taxpayer declares to the foreign government that they are not a tax resident of that country. Such declaration could be on visa applications or tax returns, or imposed as a condition of a visa. Eligibility for the exclusion may be affected by some tax treaties.

Counting the days for the physical presence test requires a determination for each day separately. The IRS makes it clear in Publication 54 that each day can be in more than one 12-month period. A 12-month period may begin on any day of any month.

== Amount of exclusion ==
The maximum exclusion is $132,900 for tax year 2026 (future years indexed for inflation). The amount of exclusion that a taxpayer is entitled to is equal to the lesser of foreign earned income for the year or the maximum exclusion, divided by the total number of days (365 or 366) in the year times the number of "qualifying days". The exclusion is then reduced by half of self-employment tax.

The "housing exclusion" is the amount of housing expenses in excess of 16% of the exclusion limit, computed on a daily basis. It is also based on the number of qualifying days, and is limited to a specific dollar amount based on the location of housing.

The exclusion is limited to income earned by a taxpayer for performance of services outside the U.S. This includes salary, bonus, and self-employment income. Where income relates to services both in the U.S. and outside the U.S., the income must be apportioned.

Special rules apply to Foreign Service and military personnel.

== Form 2555 required ==
The exclusion is an election. Taxpayers may claim the exclusion only if they file IRS Form 2555 or Form 2555-EZ. The form must be attached to a timely filed U.S. Individual Income Tax Return (IRS Form 1040) for the first year of election, or an amended timely filed return. IRS regulations allow the election with late-filed returns in some cases. The election to exclude may be revoked at any time; however, once revoked the exclusion may not be elected again for five years.

== Calculation of tax ==
Although called an exclusion for historical reasons, since the 2006 tax year it is better described as a credit equal to the amount of tax that would have been owed on the eligible foreign income, without considering any deductions or exemptions. The effect of this is to limit the advantage of the exclusion to a reduction in tax of no more than the amount that would apply for a lower income taxpayer, even if the taxpayer is in a higher tax bracket.
