= Bona fide resident test =

U.S. residency test for tax exclusion eligibility

The bona fide residence test, like the physical presence test, comprises one way that an individual can qualify for the foreign earned income exclusion from United States income tax. In order to qualify for the bona fide residence test, an individual needs to reside in a foreign country for an uninterrupted period that includes an entire tax year. In addition, the bona fide residence test takes into account factors such as the individual's intention, the purpose of the trip, and the length and nature of the stay. There are special deductions and exclusions that accompany this only if the individual is a U.S. citizen or U.S. resident alien and has a tax treaty. The bona fide residence is not always the same as the domicile. The domicile is defined as one's permanent home.

== Example ==
Mike moves to South Africa for work and expects to be there for an indefinite or extended period. Mike has a residence in South Africa for an entire year; his home is still in New York City, and he intends to return here after his stay in South Africa. Even though Mike is a bona fide resident of South Africa, his domicile is the United States, but he probably will qualify for FEIE, because his stay was more than a year, and for an indefinite period. (Note: This is not all that is needed to determine the FEIE. For more, see: IRS - Bona Fide Residence Test) The IRS largely determines your tax status based on form 2555.

== Statement to foreign authorities ==
The individual is not considered a real resident of a foreign country if at any time the individual makes a statement that s/he is not a resident of that country; and the authorities decide that the individual is not subject to their income tax laws. Also, if the government of the foreign country is currently deciding on the individual's status, the individual is not considered a real resident at that point.

== Special agreements and treaties ==
A tax treaty will not in and of itself exempt a person from being considered a citizen of another country. However, some general rules apply. U.S. armed forces stationed abroad including civilian component of armed service will almost never be able to become bona fide residents while employed on duty in a foreign country.

== Uninterrupted period including entire tax year ==
To pass the bona fide residency test, the individual needs to reside within a foreign country for an entire tax year, defined as January 1 through December 31. The individual is allowed to leave this country for brief trips back to the U.S., or somewhere else for either vacation or business. However, the individual needs to have a “clear intention” of returning to the country from the trips. The individual's bona fide residence can include an entire tax year and parts of two other tax years.

If the individual is reassigned for employment reasons, the individual is sometimes allowed a break between foreign residencies, but this depends on the circumstances. The individual may meet the “physical presence test” or qualify for foreign income exemptions even if s/he doesn't qualify as a bona fide foreign resident.
