= Tax residence =

Taxpayer's location for tax responsibility purposes

The criteria for residence for tax purposes vary considerably from jurisdiction to jurisdiction, and "residence" can be different for other, non-tax purposes. For individuals, physical presence in a jurisdiction is the main test. Some jurisdictions also determine residency of an individual by reference to a variety of other factors, such as the ownership of a home or availability of accommodation, family, and financial interests. For companies, some jurisdictions determine the residence of a corporation based on its place of incorporation. Other jurisdictions determine the residence of a corporation by reference to its place of management. Some jurisdictions use both a place-of-incorporation test and a place-of-management test.

Domicile is, in common law jurisdictions, a different legal concept to residence, though the place of residence and the place of domicile would typically be the same.

Systems of taxation on personal income No income tax on individuals Territorial Residential Citizenship-based

The criteria for residence in double taxation treaties may be different from those of domestic law. Residency in domestic law allows a country to create a tax claim based on the residence over a person, whereas in a double taxation treaty it has the effect of restricting such tax claim in order to avoid double taxation. Residency or citizenship taxation systems are typically linked with worldwide taxation, as opposed to territorial taxation. Therefore, it is particularly relevant when two countries simultaneously claim a person to be a resident within their jurisdiction.

== In international tax law ==
Double taxation treaties generally follow the OECD Model Convention. Other relevant models are the UN Model Convention, in the case of treaties with developing countries and the US Model Convention, in the case of treaties negotiated by the United States.

=== OECD and UN Model Convention ===
The OECD Model Convention and the UN Model Convention are identical. They first provide for a definition of "resident of a Contracting State":

1. For the purposes of this Convention, the term "resident of a Contracting State" means any person who, under the laws of that State, is liable to tax therein by reason of his domicile, residence, place of management or any other criterion of a similar nature, and also includes that State and any political subdivision or local authority thereof. This term, however, does not include any person who is liable to tax in that State in respect only of income from sources in that State or capital situated therein.

The definition is followed by "tie-breaker" rules for individuals and non-individuals, which result in the person being considered resident in only one of the countries:

2. Where by reason of the provisions of paragraph 1 an individual is a resident of both Contracting States, then his status shall be determined as follows:

a) he shall be deemed to be a resident only of the State in which he has a permanent home available to him; if he has a permanent home available to him in both States, he shall be deemed to be a resident only of the State with which his personal and economic relations are closer (centre of vital interests);
b) if the State in which he has his centre of vital interests cannot be determined, or if he has not a permanent home available to him in either State, he shall be deemed to be a resident only of the State in which he has an habitual abode;
c) if he has a habitual abode in both States or in neither of them, he shall be deemed to be a resident only of the State of which he is a national;
d) if he is a national of both States or of neither of them, the competent authorities of the Contracting States shall settle the question by mutual agreement.

Until 2017 the OECD Model Convention provided that

3. "Where by reason of the provisions of paragraph 1 a person other than an individual is a resident of both Contracting States, then it shall be deemed to be a resident only of the State in which its place of effective management is situated.[4]

The text now provides that

"Where by reason of the provisions of paragraph 1 a person other than an individual is resident in both Contracting States, the competent authorities of the Contracting States shall endeavour to determine by mutual agreement the Contracting State of which such person shall be deemed to be a resident for the purposes of the Convention, having regard to its place of effective management, the place where it is incorporated or otherwise constituted and any other relevant factors. In the absence of such agreement, such person shall not be entitled to any relief or exemption from tax provided by this Convention except to the extent and in such manner as may be agreed upon by the competent authorities of the Contracting States."

=== US Model Convention ===
The US Model Convention is similar to the OECD and UN Model Convention with respect to residency of individuals. Where a company is a resident of both Contracting States, such company shall not be treated as a resident of either Contracting State for purposes of its claiming the benefits of the tax treaty.

Where a person other than an individual or a company is a resident of both Contracting States, the competent authorities of the Contracting States shall by mutual agreement endeavor to determine the mode of application of this Convention to that person. Therefore, domestic taxation will continue as normal until an agreement is reached.

== In the United Kingdom ==
=== In the United Kingdom for companies ===
A company is generally treated as resident in the United Kingdom for tax purposes if it is incorporated in the United Kingdom or, if the company is not incorporated in the United Kingdom, if its central management and control are exercised in the United Kingdom. "Central management and control" refers to the highest level of oversight, usually as exercised by the board, rather than day-to-day management.

=== In the United Kingdom for individuals ===
Schedule 45 of the Finance Act 2013 sets out the rules for determining whether individuals are resident or not resident in the UK. This is known as the statutory residence test. The rules are complicated and the following is only a brief outline.

The Test takes into account the amount of time the individual spends or works in the UK and the connections the individual has with the UK. The Test is split into automatic overseas tests, automatic UK tests, and sufficient ties test. There are additional rules for residence of deceased persons and split years (years of arrival and departure).

An individual who spends 183 days or more in the UK in a tax year is a UK resident. If the individual fulfills this, there is no need to consider any other tests. If this limb is not fulfilled, the individual will be resident in the UK for a tax year and at all times in the tax year if

- they do not meet any of the automatic overseas tests, and
- they meet one of the automatic UK tests or the sufficient ties test.

An individual will not be resident in the UK for the tax year if

- they do meet one of the automatic overseas tests, or
- they do not meet any of the automatic UK tests or the sufficient ties test.

Automatic overseas tests

Under this limb there are three tests to consider:

- First Automatic Overseas Test

The individual will be a non-UK resident for the tax year if they were resident in the UK for one or more of the three tax years before the current tax year and they spend fewer than 16 days in the UK in the tax year.

- Second automatic overseas test

The individual will be a non-UK resident for the tax year if they were resident in the UK for none of the three tax years before the current tax year and they spend fewer than 46 days in the UK in the tax year.

- Third automatic overseas test

The individual will be non-UK resident for the tax year if they work full-time overseas over the tax year and: they spend fewer than 91 days in the UK in the tax year; the number of days on which they work for more than three hours in the UK is less than 31 and there is no significant break from their overseas work. A significant break is when at least 31 days go by and not one of those days is a day where the individual works for more than three hours overseas and would have worked for more than three hours overseas, but they did not do so because they were on annual leave, sick leave or parenting leave If the individual does have a significant break from overseas work they will not qualify for full-time work overseas.

The test can apply to both employees and the self-employed.

Automatic UK tests

Under this limb there are three tests to consider again:

- First automatic UK test

The individual will be UK resident for the tax year if they spend 183 days or more in the UK during the tax year.

- Second automatic test

The individual will be UK resident for the tax year if they have, or have had, a home in the UK for all or part of the year and all of the following apply: there is or was at least one period of 91 consecutive days when they had a home in the UK; at least 30 of these 91 days fall in the tax year when they had a home in the UK and they have been present in that home for at least 30 days at any time during the year; and at that time they had no overseas home, or they did they were present in it for fewer than 30 days in the tax year.

- Third automatic test

The individual will be UK resident for the tax year if all of the following apply: they work full-time in the UK for any period of 365 days, which falls in the tax year; more than 75% of the total number of days in the 365-day period when they do more than three hours work are days when they do more than three hours work in the UK; and at least one day which has to be both in the 365-day period and the tax year is a day on which they do more than three hours work in the UK.

Sufficient ties test

If the individual does not meet any of the automatic overseas tests and the automatic UK tests, they will have to consider their connections to the UK, known as 'ties'. This includes family ties, accommodation ties, work tie or a 90-day tie. If they were resident in the UK for one or more of the three tax years before the one they are considering they will also have to check whether they have a country tie.

Table A: UK ties needed if an individual was UK resident for one or more of the three tax years before the tax year under consideration
Days spent in the UK in the tax year under consideration	UK ties needed
16–45	At least 4
46–90	At least 3
91–120	At least 2
Over 120	At least 1

Table B: UK ties needed if the individual was UK resident in none of the three tax years before the tax year under consideration
Days spent in the UK in the tax year under consideration	UK ties needed
46–90	All 4
91–120	At least 3
Over 120	At least 2

== In Germany ==
All tax-resident individuals are taxed on their worldwide income, regardless of the source. This would include salary, dividends, etc. earned from one's limited company. Generally, individuals are deemed to be tax residents if they are physically present in Germany for more than six months in any one calendar year or for a consecutive period of six months over a calendar year-end. This ruling is applied retrospectively so presence in Germany from 1 March to 30 November, for example, would make one a German tax resident and therefore subject to German tax on the worldwide income for the entire period rather than just from the beginning of the seventh month.

An individual can also be deemed tax-resident if they acquire an abode in Germany. This can include renting, as opposed to purchasing, a property but only if the duration of the lease is deemed to be more than temporary. For this reason, to avoid German tax residency, short-term (such as three months) should be taken out wherever possible.

Non-resident individuals are taxed on German-source income only. In the case of salary and benefits from one's limited company, the source is German since the duties of the employment are being performed in Germany. However, dividends from a limited company (assuming this is not deemed to have a permanent establishment in Germany: see below) would be from a non-German source regardless of where the dividends are received. There is, therefore, the scope for tax mitigation here if one does not become a German tax resident (although non-German taxes may also need to be considered).

== In France ==
In France, taxpayers are either "domiciled" or are "non-resident". Domiciled individuals are subject to French tax on worldwide income, but non-residents are not taxed on foreign-source income. Many treaty exemptions may apply, however (e.g. foreign-source trading or rental income). Under Article 4B of the French Tax Code (Code Général des Impôts), an individual is resident in France for tax purposes if:

- they have a home (foyer) or their principal place of physical presence in France,
- they have their professional activity in France unless such activity is only ancillary, or
- they have the centre of their economic interests in France.

French courts have ruled that the principal place of physical presence test is only applicable where the "home" test cannot be applied. A "home" is to be construed as the place where the taxpayer normally lives, without any regard being given to the taxpayer's temporary stays in another country. As the "home" test is concerned with where the taxpayer's family ties are (i.e. where the spouse and children live), this test is highly unlikely to apply to single individuals. Consequently, the principal place of the physical presence test should be viewed as primarily applicable to single individuals only.

"Principal place of physical presence" covers a wider range of situations that a basic 183-day rule would have. This is because the taxpayer's physical presence in France in a given calendar year will be tested against his presence in another country. Perpetual travelers must therefore be able to demonstrate that they have resided in a foreign country for a longer period in the relevant calendar year.

== In Liechtenstein ==
In Liechtenstein, generally speaking all registered residents are also deemed to be tax-resident in Liechtenstein and are thus taxed there on their entire worldwide income and wealth.

== In Switzerland ==
In Switzerland, generally speaking, all registered residents are also deemed to be tax-resident in Switzerland and are thus taxed there on their entire worldwide income and wealth, except on the income and wealth from foreign business or real estate or where tax treaties limit double taxation. For tax purposes, residence may also arise if a person stays in Switzerland for 30 days, or for 90 days if he or she does not work.

Either a progressive or proportional income tax is levied by the Confederation and by the cantons on the income of natural persons. The income tax is imposed as a payroll tax on foreign workers without a residence permit, and in the form of a withholding tax on certain transient persons, such as foreign musicians performing in Switzerland.

Taxable income includes all funds accruing to a person from all sources, in principle without deduction of losses or expenses, and usually including the rental value of a house lived in by its owner.

Non-working foreigners resident in Switzerland may choose to pay a lump-sum tax instead of the normal income tax. The tax, which is generally much lower than the normal income tax, is nominally levied on the taxpayer's living expenses, but in practice (which varies from canton to canton), it is common to use the quintuple of the rent paid by the taxpayer as a basis for the lump-sum taxation. This option contributes to Switzerland's status as a tax haven and has induced many wealthy foreigners to live in Switzerland.

== In Russia ==
In Russian Federation all tax-resident individuals are taxed on their worldwide income, regardless of the source. Individuals are deemed to be tax residents if they are physically present in Russia for more than 183 days during a consecutive period of 12 months. The period of presence in Russia is not interrupted in case the individual is out of the country for less than six months for educational purposes or for medical treatment. Foreign servants and civil servants that were sent abroad for work purposes are deemed tax residents no matter how long they are actually present in Russia.

== See also ==
- International taxation
- Permanent establishment
- Permanent tourist
- Physical presence test
- Tax exile
- Tax haven
- Tax treaty

== Sources ==
- Amonn, Toni (2008). Repetitorium zum Steuerrecht (in German) (3rd. ed.). Berne: Haupt. ISBN 978-3-258-07124-4.
- Kessler QC, James (2020). Taxation of Non-Residents and Foreign Domiciliaries (2020/21 ed.). London: Key Haven Publications. ISBN 978-1-901614-82-4.
