= Internal Revenue Manual =

Employee rulebook of the U.S. Internal Revenue Service

The Internal Revenue Manual (IRM) is an official compendium of internal guidelines for personnel of the United States Internal Revenue Service (IRS).

== History ==
The IRM was made publicly available through the Freedom of Information Act (FOIA).

== Legal status ==
According to CCH (formerly known as Commerce Clearing House, Inc.):

The IRS Internal Revenue Manual is the official source of instructions to IRS personnel relating to the organization, administration and operation of the IRS. The IRM contains directions IRS employees need to carry out their responsibilities in administering IRS obligations, such as detailed procedures for processing and examining tax returns.

Procedures set forth in the IRM are not mandatory and are not binding on the IRS. The provisions are not issued pursuant to a mandate or delegation of authority by Congress and do not have the effect of a rule of law. Nonetheless, IRM offers insights into IRS procedures, and many tax practitioners use the IRM for guidance.

In the Internal Revenue Manual, the IRS states:

The IRM is the primary, official source of "instructions to staff" that relate to the administration and operation of the IRS. It details the policies, delegations of authorities, procedures, instructions and guidelines for daily operations for all IRS organizations. The IRM ensures that employees have the approved policy and guidance they need to carry out their responsibilities in administering the tax laws or other agency obligations.

The Internal Revenue Manual itself is not the law. The general rule is that neither the taxpayer nor the IRS is bound by the Internal Revenue Manual. See, e.g., United States v. Horne and First Federal Savings & Loan Ass'n v. Goldman.
