= Tax treaty =

Fiscal policy

A tax treaty, also called double tax agreement (DTA) or double tax avoidance agreement (DTAA), is an agreement between two countries to avoid or mitigate double taxation. Such treaties may cover a range of taxes including income taxes, inheritance taxes, value added taxes, or other taxes. Besides bilateral treaties, multilateral treaties are also in place. For example, European Union (EU) countries are parties to a multilateral agreement with respect to value added taxes under auspices of the EU, while a joint treaty on mutual administrative assistance of the Council of Europe and the Organisation for Economic Co-operation and Development (OECD) is open to all countries. Tax treaties tend to reduce taxes of one treaty country for residents of the other treaty country to reduce double taxation of the same income.

The provisions and goals vary significantly, with very few tax treaties being alike. Most treaties:

- define which taxes are covered and who is a resident and eligible for benefits,
- reduce the amounts of tax withheld from interest, dividends, and royalties paid by a resident of one country to residents of the other country,
- limit tax of one country on business income of a resident of the other country to that income from a permanent establishment in the first country,
- define circumstances in which income of individuals resident in one country will be taxed in the other country, including salary, self-employment, pension, and other income,
- provide for exemption of certain types of organizations or individuals, and
- provide procedural frameworks for enforcement and dispute resolution.

The stated goals for entering into a treaty often include reduction of double taxation, eliminating tax evasion, and encouraging cross-border trade efficiency. It is generally accepted that tax treaties improve certainty for taxpayers and tax authorities in their international dealings.

Several governments and organizations use model treaties as starting points. Double taxation treaties generally follow the OECD Model Convention and member comments thereon serve as a guidance as to interpretation by each member country. Other relevant models are the UN Model Convention, in the case of treaties with developing countries and the US Model Convention, in the case of treaties negotiated by the United States.

== Tax residency ==
In general, the benefits of tax treaties are available only to tax residents of one of the treaty countries. In most cases, a tax resident of a country is any person that is subject to tax under the domestic laws of that country by reason of domicile, residence, place of incorporation, or similar criteria.

Generally, individuals are considered resident under a tax treaty and subject to taxation where they maintain their primary place of abode. However, residence for treaty purposes extends well beyond the narrow scope of primary place of abode. For example, many countries also treat persons spending more than a fixed number of days in the country as residents. The United States includes citizens and green card holders, wherever living, as subject to taxation, and therefore as residents for tax treaty purposes. Because residence is defined so broadly, most treaties recognize that a person could meet the definition of residence in more than one jurisdiction (i.e., "dual residence") and provide a “tie breaker” clause. Such clauses typically have a hierarchy of three to five tests for resolving multiple residency, typically including permanent abode as a major factor. Tax residency rarely impacts citizenship or permanent resident status, though certain residency statuses under a country's immigration law may influence tax residency. This includes the '183 day rule' when the right of abode is invoked.

Entities may be considered resident based on their country seat of management, their country of organization, or other factors. The criteria are often specified in a treaty, which may enhance or override local law. It is possible under most treaties for an entity to be resident in both countries, particularly where a treaty is between two countries that use different standards for residence under their domestic law. Some treaties provide “tie breaker” rules for entity residency, some do not. Residency is irrelevant in the case of some entities and/or types of income, as members of the entity rather than the entity are subject to tax. The OECD has moved away from place of effective management to a case-by-case resolution using Mutual Agreement Procedure (MAP) for determining conflicts of dual residency.

== Permanent establishment ==
Most treaties provide that business profits (sometimes defined in the treaty) of a resident of one country are subject to tax in the other country only if the profits arise through a permanent establishment in the other country. E.g., in the treaty between US and India, if the person is a resident of both countries then further clause added to the argument would be if the person owns a permanent house or has an habitual abode or being a national of a state. Many treaties, however, address certain types of business profits (such as directors' fees or income from the activities of athletes and entertainers) separately. Such treaties also define what constitutes a permanent establishment (PE). Most but not all tax treaties follow the definition of PE in the OECD Model Treaty. Under the OECD definition, a PE is a fixed place of business through which the business of an enterprise is carried on. Certain locations are specifically enumerated as examples of PEs, including branches, offices, workshops, and others. Specific exceptions from the definition of PE are also provided, such as a site where only preliminary or ancillary activities (such as warehousing of inventory, purchasing of goods, or collection of information) are conducted.

While in general tax treaties do not specify a period of time for which business activities must be conducted through a location before it gives rise to a PE, most OECD member countries do not find a PE in cases in which a place of business exists for less than six months, absent special circumstances. Many treaties explicitly provide a longer threshold, commonly one year or more, for which a construction site must exist before it gives rise to a permanent establishment. In addition, some treaties, most commonly those in which at least one party is a developing country, contain provisions which deem a PE to exist if certain activities (such as services) are conducted for certain periods of time, even where a PE would not otherwise exist.

Even where a resident of one country does not conduct its business activities in another country through a fixed place or business, a PE may still be found to exist in that other country where the business is carried out through a person in that other country that has the authority to conclude contracts on behalf of the resident of the first country. Thus, a resident of one country cannot avoid being treated as having a PE by acting through a dependent agent rather than conducting its business directly. However, carrying on business through an independent agent will generally not result in a PE.

== Withholding taxes ==
Many tax systems provide for collection of tax from non-residents by requiring payers of certain types of income to withhold tax from the payment and remit it to the tax authorities. Withholding arrangements may apply to interest, dividends, royalties, and payments for technical assistance. Most tax treaties reduce or eliminate the amount of tax required to be withheld with respect to residents of a treaty country.

== Income from employment ==
Most treaties provide mechanisms eliminating taxation of residents of one country by the other country where the amount or duration of performance of services is minimal but also taxing the income in the country performed where it is not minimal. Most treaties also provide special provisions for entertainers and athletes of one country having income in the other country, though such provisions vary highly. Also most treaties provide for limits to taxation of pension or other retirement income.

== Tax exemptions ==
Most treaties eliminate from taxation income of certain diplomatic personnel. Most tax treaties also provide that certain entities exempt from tax in one country are also exempt from tax in the other. Entities typically exempt include charities, pension trusts, and government owned entities. Many treaties provide for other exemptions from taxation that one or both countries as considered relevant under their governmental or economic system.

== Harmonization of tax rates ==
Tax treaties usually specify the same maximum rate of tax that may be imposed on some types of income. As an example, a treaty may provide that interest earned by a nonresident eligible for benefits under the treaty is taxed at no more than five percent (5%). However, local law in some cases may provide a lower rate of tax irrespective of the treaty. In such cases, the lower local law rate prevails.

== Provisions unique to inheritance taxes ==
Generally, income taxes and inheritance taxes are addressed in separate treaties. Inheritance tax treaties often cover estate and gift taxes. Generally fiscal domicile under such treaties is defined by reference to domicile as opposed to tax residence. Such treaties specify what persons and property are subject to tax by each country upon transfer of the property by inheritance or gift. Some treaties specify which party bears the burden of such tax, but often such determination relies on local law (which may differ from country to country).

Most inheritance tax treaties permit each country to tax domiciliaries of the other country on real property situated in the taxing country, property forming a part of a trade or business in the taxing country, tangible movable property situated in the taxing country at the time of transfer (often excluding ships and aircraft operated internationally), and certain other items. Most treaties permit the estate or donor to claim certain deductions, exemptions, or credits in calculating the tax that might not otherwise be allowed to non-domiciliaries.

== Double tax relief ==
Nearly all tax treaties provide a specific mechanism for eliminating it, but the risk of double taxation is still potentially present. This mechanism usually requires that each country grant a credit for the taxes of the other country to reduce the taxes of a resident of the country. Seen in the US-India treaty, as per the DTAA, if interest income arises in India and the amount belongs to a US Resident, then said amount shall be taxable in the US. However, such interest may also be liable to tax in India as per the Indian Income Tax Act. The treaty may or may not provide mechanisms for limiting this credit, and may or may not limit the application of local law mechanisms to do the same.

== Mutual enforcement ==
Taxpayers may relocate themselves and their assets to avoid paying taxes. Some treaties thus require each treaty country to assist the other in collection of taxes, to counter the revenue rule, and other enforcement of their tax rules. Most tax treaties include, at a minimum, a requirement that the countries exchange information needed to foster enforcement.

== Tax information exchange agreement ==
The purpose of this agreement is to promote international co-operation in tax matters through exchange of information. It was developed by the OECD Global Forum Working Group on Effective Exchange of Information.

The working group consisted of representatives from OECD Member countries as well as delegates from Aruba, Bermuda, Bahrain, Cayman Islands, Cyprus, Isle of Man, Malta, Mauritius, the Netherlands Antilles, the Seychelles and San Marino.

The agreement grew out of the work undertaken by the OECD to address harmful tax practices. The lack of effective exchange of information is one of the key criteria in determining harmful tax practices. The mandate of the working group was to develop a legal instrument that could be used to establish effective exchange of information.

The agreement represents the standard of effective exchange of information for the purposes of the OECD's initiative on harmful tax practices. This agreement, which was released in April 2002, is not a binding instrument but contains two models for bilateral agreements. A number of bilateral agreements have been based on this agreement.

== Dispute resolution ==
Nearly all tax treaties provide some mechanism under which taxpayers and the countries can resolve disputes arising under the treaty. Generally, the government agency responsible for conducting dispute resolution procedures under the treaty is referred to as the competent authority of the country. Competent authorities generally have the power to bind their government in specific cases. The treaty mechanism often calls for the competent authorities to attempt to agree in resolving disputes.

== Limitations on benefits ==
Recent treaties of certain countries have contained an article intended to prevent "treaty shopping", which is the inappropriate use of tax treaties by residents of third states. These limitation on benefits articles deny the benefits of the tax treaty to residents that do not meet additional tests. Limitation on Benefits articles vary widely from treaty to treaty, and are often quite complex. The treaties of some countries, such as the United Kingdom and Italy, focus on subjective purpose for a particular transaction, denying benefits where the transaction was entered into in order to obtain benefits under the treaty. Other countries, such as the United States, focus on the objective characteristics of the party seeking benefits. Generally, individuals and publicly traded companies and their subsidiaries are not adversely impacted by the provisions of a typical limitation of benefits provision in a U.S. tax treaty. With respect to other entities, the provisions tend to deny benefits where an entity seeking benefits is not sufficiently owned by residents of one of the treaty countries (or, in the case of treaties with members of a unified economic bloc such as the European Union or NAFTA, by "equivalent beneficiaries" in the same group of countries). Even where entities are not owned by qualified residents, however, benefits are often available for income earned from the active conduct of a trade or business.

== Priority of law ==
Treaties are considered the supreme law of many countries. In those countries, treaty provisions fully override conflicting domestic law provisions. For example, many EU countries could not enforce their group relief schemes under the EU directives. In some countries, treaties are considered of equal weight to domestic law. In those countries, a conflict between domestic law and the treaty must be resolved under the dispute resolution mechanisms of either domestic law or the treaty.
