= Academic training =

Academic training (AT) is a type of off-campus work authorization for students in J-1 status. The J-1 is a status for students and exchange visitors that is part of the Student and Exchange Visitor Program managed by the U.S. Department of State in collaboration with U.S. Immigration and Customs Enforcement in the United States. The AT program is used by J-1 students for employment training or practical experience directly related to the student's current major specialty.

AT is the opportunity for J-1 students to apply knowledge gained in the program of study to off-campus work. AT may include, but isn't limited to, internships, practicums and cooperative education.

AT is the analogue of Optional Practical Training for students on a J-1 visa status. A student cannot simultaneously be eligible for Optional Practical Training (also known as OPT) and Academic Training: OPT is for F-1 visa and M-1 visa students, whereas AT is for J-1 visa students.

== See also ==
- Educaedu
- I-20 (form)
