= Deferred inspection =

Deferred inspection is a procedure in immigration enforcement in the United States for Arriving Aliens. Here, the final decision on whether to admit the Arriving Alien, instead of being conducted at the port of entry where the alien arrived, is deferred to be carried out later at a deferred inspection site, while the alien is paroled into the United States. The guidelines followed at the deferred inspection site are largely the same as those followed by the officers at the port of entry, and are described in the U.S. Customs and Border Protection's Inspector's Field Manual. Aliens do not accrue unlawful presence between the time of arrival and the date of deferred inspection, but they do begin to accrue unlawful presence after their parole ends, if they are not successfully admitted at the deferred inspection site by then. The officers at both the port of entry and the deferred inspection site are part of the CBP Office of Field Operations.

== Decision at the port of entry to use deferred inspection ==
=== Conditions under which the officer at the port of entry may choose deferred inspection ===
Deferred inspection is used in cases where the officer at the port of entry (such as an airport or a sea port) has doubts about the arriving alien's admissibility to the United States, and believes these doubts cannot be satisfactorily resolved at the port of entry but can be resolved through one or more of these:

- Presentation of additional evidence
- Further review of the case
- The posting of a maintenance of status and departure bond
- Other similar action that can only be conducted at the onward location

Deferred inspection should not be used merely with the goal of transferring a difficult case to another office, but rather should be accompanied by clear reasons for deferral. Moreover, the option is generally intended for use only in cases where it is believed that the case is likely to be resolved in the alien's favor, and not in cases where the alien is likely to be established inadmissible.

The officer at the port of entry should consider the following when making a decision to defer inspection:

- The likelihood that the alien will be able to establish admissibility: Only if this is high will inspection be deferred.
- The type of documents lacking, and the ability to obtain necessary documentation: Only if it is deemed likely that the alien can obtain the documents will the inspection be deferred.
- The alien's good faith efforts to obtain necessary documents prior to arrival at the POE: If the alien did not make good faith efforts, deferred inspection is less likely to be granted.
- The verification or establishment of the alien's identity and nationality
- Age, health, and family ties
- Other humanitarian considerations
- The likelihood that the alien will appear
- The nature of possible inadmissibility (i.e., criminal history, previous violations)
- The potential danger posed to society if the alien is paroled: The more dangerous he alien is deemed, the less likely deferred inspection is.

Common reasons for deferred inspection include situations where a Lawful Permanent Resident is believed to have been outside the United States for over 180 days, or cases where the alien is believed to have committed a crime that makes the alien inadmissible or removable.

=== Procedure at the port of entry ===
The following procedures are followed for deferred inspection:

- The deferral of inspection must be approved by the port director, assistant port director, or chief inspector at the GS-13 level or above.
- If approved, the alien is issued a Form I-546, Order to Appear for Deferred Inspection. The form includes the name of the deferred inspection site where the alien must appear. The deferred inspection site where the alien is asked to appear is called the onward office.
- Information about the deferred inspection, including a copy of the Form I-546, is added to the alien's information on record with the CBP, and forwarded to the onward office within 24 hours of the scheduling of the deferred inspection.
- The alien is photographed and fingerprinted using Form FD-249.
- The alien is paroled for a period of at most 30 days, and the Form I-94 is stamped with a parole stamp and endorsed to indicate the following:
  - Date to which deferred/paroled
  - DE, Deferred Inspection (with purpose)
  - Deferring port code
  - Action date
  - The officer's admission stamp code
  - Onward office code
- In addition, a Form I-259, Notice to Detain, Remove, or Present Alien, is issued to the alien's air or sea carrier, telling the carrier that it is possible that the alien may need to be returned (either as a result of an expedited removal order or because the alien is asked to withdraw his or her application for admission at the deferred inspection site).

== Processing before and at the onward office ==
=== Preparation for the deferred inspection ===
The alien needs to work to acquire all the relevant documentation that needs to be presented to demonstrate admissibility, to show at the onward office.

On CBP's side, the port of entry forwards the alien's file, including a copy of the Form I-546, to the onward office. The onward office may need to do additional processing to evaluate te alien's admissibility.

=== Conduct of the deferred inspection ===
When the alien appears for the deferred inspection at the onward office, the officer here inspects the alien using the same rules that the officer at the port of entry would, but now armed with the additional documentation available. There are two possibilities:

- The alien is found admissible: The alien's parole period ends and the alien is now considered officially admitted to the United States. If the alien is not a Lawful Permanent Resident and is entering in a non-immigrant status, then a new Form I-94 is issued.
- The alien is found inadmissible: The officer may discretionarily allow the alien to withdraw the application for admission, to which the alien may or may not consent. The officer may also issue an order of expedited removal against the alien, or put the alien through removal proceedings. In the case of a withdrawal of application for admission or order of expedited removal, the original Form I-259 issued at the port of entry can be used to compel the alien's carrier to return the alien.

The CBP officer conducting the deferred inspection at the onward office may allow the applicant's attorney to be present. However, the attorney's role is limited to that of observer and consultant for the applicant, and the attorney does not have legal authority to represent the applicant.

=== Dealing with no shows ===
It is the onward office's responsibility to monitor the progress of cases referred for a deferred inspection. Cases should not be pending longer than 30 days after the expiration of the scheduled appointment unless the applicant requested an extension. If the alien fails to appear for his or her deferred inspection, then the alien starts accruing unlawful presence and receives a Form I-862 Notice to Appear, indicating the beginning of removal proceedings against the alien. At this point, regardless of the issue of the alien's original admissibility, the alien's subsequent unlawful presence can hurt his or her immigration record.

== Other actions ==
=== Corrections to Form I-94 ===
Deferred inspection sites also be used by aliens seeking to fix problems with the documents issued to them at the port of entry (specifically, the Form I-94). For instance, if an alien entered lawfully but was not issued a Form I-94, or was issued a Form I-94 with incorrect information. In addition, if some information was not entered correctly on the Form I-94, this can be fixed at a deferred inspection site.

=== Changes to the expiration date on Form I-94 are not handled at deferred inspection site ===
Deferred inspection sites are only intended for correcting errors at the port of entry, rather than extending the expiration date of a correctly filled Form I-94. To extend the validity of Form I-94, the extension needs to be made with the appropriate government agency. In particular:

- In general, the standard methods to extend or change non-immigrant status, such as Form I-129 (when extending or switching to a temporary work status), Form I-539 (for other statuses), and Form I-485 (for Adjustment of Status to a Lawful Permanent Resident) apply.
- For people on student and exchange visitor visas (F visa and J visa), if the Form I-94 has expiration date specified as "D/S" (Duration of Status) it suffices to extend the underlying authorization by extending the expiration date on the Form I-20. This is done with the assistance of the student's Designated School Official (DSO).
- For people on student and exchange visitor visas, there could be cases where the Form I-94's expiration date is 30 days from the date of arrival, instead of "D/S". This happens when there are some problems with the alien's documentation. The alien is issued Form I-515A explaining the problem, and must coordinate with the DSO to send this documentation, along with Form I-20 or Form DS-2019, Form I-94, admission stamp, and the SEVIS fee, to the Student and Exchange Visitor Program of U.S. Immigration and Customs Enforcement. Although qualitatively similar to deferred inspection, this differs in that the alien is officially admitted rather than paroled, and the next step is carried out with the SEVP rather than with the CBP. If the Form I-94 does not have "D/S" but the applicant did not receive a Form I-515A, this is an error on CBP's part and should be resolved at a Deferred Inspection site.
