= Form I-539 =

Form I-539, Application to Extend/Change Nonimmigrant Status is one of the forms issued by the United States Citizenship and Immigration Services. It is used by people currently in the United States in a non-immigrant status to change the classification for their status and/or extend their stay with their current status. Both the current status and the status to which the transition is being sought must be non-immigrant visa statuses.

The corresponding form used for Adjustment of Status to that of a Lawful Permanent Resident is Form I-485. However, whereas Form I-485 is always needed when adjusting status within the United States to that of Lawful Permanent Resident from a non-immigrant status, Form I-539 is only needed for some kinds of transitions or extensions of stay.

== Extension of stay ==
=== Extendable current statuses ===
For the following current statuses, any extension of stay beyond that specified on the Form I-94 requires the filing of Form I-539:

- A visa: ambassadors, public ministers, career diplomatic or consular officers and their immediate family members
- A-3 visa: attendants, servants, and personal employees of A visa holders and their immediate family members
- B visa (B-1/B-2 are the business and tourism visas)
- CW-1 dependents
- E visa dependents
- F visa (only the public secondary school case) and their dependents
- G
- G-5
- H dependents
- K-3 (fiancé(e) of U.S. citizen) and minor children
- K-4 (spouse of U.S. citizen) and minor children
- L (intracompany transferees’) dependents
- M (vocational students) and their dependents. Note that this includes those applying for post-completion Optional Practical Training
- N (parents and children of certain special immigrants)
- NATO-7 – Attendants, Servants, Personal Employees of NATO Representatives, Officials, Employees and Immediate Family Members
- O (aliens with extraordinary ability) dependents
- P (athletes’ and entertainers’) dependents
- R (religious worker) dependents
- TD dependents of TN visa holders

=== Non-extendable current statuses ===
For the following categories, it is not possible to change status while in the United States, or extend stay beyond that specified in Form I-94:

- C (Alien in Transit)
- D (Crewman)
- K-1 or K-2 (Fiancé(e) or Dependent of Fiancé(e))
- K-3 or K-4 (Certain Husbands and Wives of U.S. Citizens and their Dependent Children)
- S (Witness or Informant)
- TWOV (Transit without Visa)
- WT or WB (entrants under the Visa Waiver Program)

The most numerically significant of these ineligible categories is entrants under the Visa Waiver Program. They cannot use Form I-539 except in exceptional circumstances. Thus, even people from VWP-eligible countries who believe they might need to extend their stay or change their status should get B visas.

For the following categories, there are restrictions concerning one's ability to request a change in one's nonimmigrant status:

- J-1 visa (exchange visitor subject to the 2-year foreign residence requirement)
- M-1 visa (vocational student, cannot transition to F-1 or any H visa that they trained for)

=== College student exception ===
For students on F visa (in post-secondary institutions) and their dependents, if the Form I-94 (or any update to it from a previously filed Form I-539) specifies "Duration of Status" (abbreviated "D/S") as the expiration date, then one simply needs to extend the underlying authorization.

Explicitly, an updated Form I-20 needs to be issued to the student by the international office at his or her institution, with a new expiration date. No Form I-539 need be filed. Note that this works only if the new Form I-20 is issued prior to the expiration date of the old Form I-20. Even if transferring to a different educational institution, there is no need to file Form I-539. In general, the responsibility of keeping the student's information up-to-date lies with the Designated School Official at the institution, who acts as the intermediary between the student and the government bureaucracy. All reporting requirements imposed on students are to the DSO rather than directly to USCIS or DHS.

In addition, those applying for Optional Practical Training need to first get a new Form I-20 indicating their institution's approval for the OPT, and then get an Employment Authorization Document from the USCIS by filing Form I-765.

M students who entered for a fixed duration or course of study, as well as F students who did not get "D/S" as their expiration date (this includes all those who are studying at the K-12 level) do need to file Form I-539 to extend status or transfer to another institution.

== Change of status ==
=== To a temporary nonimmigrant worker ===
Any change of status to a status as a temporary nonimmigrant worker must be accomplished by filing Form I-129. Form I-539 is not necessary to accomplish this change of status. Thus, for instance, if trying to transition from F status to H-1B status, only Form I-129 need be filed, and not Form I-539. Similarly, Form I-129 needs to be filed when transitioning from one temporary nonimmigrant worker status to another. Since temporary nonimmigrant worker statuses are tied to specific jobs, a new Form I-129 needs to be filed even when changing to a new employer with the same type of status.

=== To the dependent of a temporary nonimmigrant worker ===
When changing status to the dependent of a temporary nonimmigrant worker, Form I-539 must be filed. An example is a change from student status to H-4 status, the status for dependents of people on other H visas. A single Form I-539 can be filed for all the dependents (such as the spouse and children) of the Form I-129 beneficiary.

=== To a student ===
Those who want to transition to a student or scholar or dependent status (such as F, J, or M) must first get the corresponding authorization from the institution (such as Form I-20 for F status and Form DS-2019 for J status) and then use that to file Form I-539. If transferring to student status using Form I-539, it is necessary to first pay the same SEVIS fee that applicants from outside the United States need to pay in order to apply for their visa.

Until the Form I-539 is approved, the person is not officially in student status and cannot start classes. This also applies for people transitioning from F-2 status to F-1 status.

The process generally takes 3–6 months, which can be considerably longer than traveling outside the United States and getting a new visa.

For those who entered the United States using a B visa, having an annotation on the visa saying that the entrant is a "Prospective Student" is generally a prerequisite for the Form I-539 application to be accepted.

In general, the USCIS does not approve transition to student status with a start date more than 30 days prior to the program start date. Therefore, applications where the applicant's current status expires more than 30 days before the start date of their program are likely to be rejected.

== Filing details ==
=== Modalities ===
==== Paper ====
Form I-539 can always be submitted by paper. The form is available for download from the USCIS website. The filing address depends on the type of status change or extension that the applicant is requesting. The possible filing addresses include lockbox facilities, service centers, and (in the case of diplomatic statuses) appropriate international bodies.

==== Electronic ====
Form I-539 may be filed electronically using the Electronic Information System (ELIS) for some categories. A single ELIS account created by a person can be used for repeated filings of Form I-539 for extension of stay or change of status.

=== Supporting documents ===
Form I-539 is generally not filed in isolation; it must be supported by two kinds of proofs.

- The first set of proofs establishes the applicant's good standing with immigration law so far: the applicant entered on a valid visa based on a valid authorization and has a valid Form I-94.
- The second set of proofs depends on whether the applicant is requesting an extension of stay or a change of status:
  - In the case of extension of stay, applicants must demonstrate the ability to finance the rest of the stay and plans to depart after the extended stay is over.
  - In the case of change of status, the applicant must show eligibility for the new status. For instance, if transitioning to the F visa status, the applicant must include a copy of the Form I-20. In general, when requesting a change of status, the set of proofs submitted must be similar to those that would be needed if applying for a visa with the new status. The applicant must also demonstrate that the earliest start date in the new status before the expiration date on the Form I-94 for the current status.

=== Fees ===
For most cases, the filing fee is $370, with no additional fees. There are a few exceptions:

- For V nonimmigrants and CNMI initial grant of status, there is an additional $85 biometric fee.
- For A and G extensions, there is no filing fee.

== Relation with Form I-94 and approval timeline ==
=== Expiration date ===
People who are not United States citizens or lawful permanent residents, when they enter the United States at a designated port of entry with a valid visa, are issued a Form I-94 (those who enter using the VWP are issued a Form I-94W, but they are not eligible to file Form I-539). This form contains an entry for the expiration date. There are two ways the expiration date may be entered:

- An actual date. In this case, the applicant's stay in the United States is valid if the status the applicant entered in is still valid and the expiration date has not yet passed. If either condition is violated the applicant's stay in the United States is not authorized.
- "D/S" or "EOS" indicating that the I-94 does not place any restrictions on the validity of the person's stay, so that the person can stay as long as otherwise authorized.

Section 3 of Form I-539 gives the applicant the opportunity to specify a new requested end date (in 1.a.) or either request or indicate that he or she has already been granted D/S. The end date for the approved Form I-539 (whether an actual date or D/S) overrides whatever was there in the Form I-94.

=== Filing timeline ===
It is important to make sure that the Form I-539 application is sent in (and ideally, that it is approved) prior to the expiration date of the Form I-94. The USCIS recommends filing the Form I-539 at least 45 days prior to the expiration date on the Form I-94. Late submissions are likely to result in denial.

=== Without Form I-94 ===
In the case that the applicant does not have a Form I-94 (either a paper form or an electronic form that he or she can print out), the applicant must contact his or her nearest Deferred Inspection Site managed by the U.S. Customs and Border Protection, in order to obtain proof of lawful entry to the United States.

=== After expiry ===
The USCIS says that if it has not reached a decision on the Form I-539 by the expiration date of the Form I-94, the applicant is no longer in authorized status. However, removal proceedings are unlikely to be initiated against the applicant and, if they are, then the pending Form I-539 can be used as a mitigating factor against the removal. Moreover, despite not being in a lawful status, the applicant does not accrue "unlawful presence" for purposes of inadmissibility to the United States. Once the application is approved, the approval retroactively makes lawful the time spent by the applicant in the United States after the expiration of the original Form I-94. If the application is denied, the applicant must immediately depart the United States (if it is denied before the expiration date, the applicant has until the expiration date of the Form I-94 to depart).

=== After approval ===
Once the Form I-539 is approved, the applicant is in a position to extend stay or transition to the new status (from the start date indicated on the Form I-539). Until receiving the approval, the applicant cannot engage in any activities that require being in the new status.

== Effect on visa ==
As a general rule, Form I-539 does not extend the validity of existing visas. To the contrary, a change of status accomplished through Form I-539 can invalidate the existing visa.

=== In case of extension of stay ===
Form I-539 may be used to extend one's stay on the same status as one currently has. This extension of stay does not change the terms of one's entry visa. In particular, it does not change whether the visa was a single-entry visa or a multiple-entry visa, nor does it change the period of validity (i.e., the expiration date) of the visa.

=== In case of change of status ===
When Form I-539 is used to change status, it invalidates any visa obtained that was associated with the applicant's previous status. Thus, whenever the applicant next travels outside the United States, the applicant is required to obtain a new visa to re-enter the United States.

=== Automatic visa revalidation ===
If the applicant's new status is a category eligible for automatic visa revalidation, then, after successfully transitioning to the new status, he or she may use automatic visa revalidation to travel to Mexico, Canada, or (for some statuses) the Caribbean islands and return in less than 30 days. Instead of the "visa", what gets revalidated is the change of status, and therefore in lieu of the visa the applicant must carry the Form I-797 Approval Notice in addition to all the other supporting documentation. In particular, it does not matter if the applicant has never acquired a visa for the new status, nor does it matter if the previous status for which the applicant did have a visa did not allow for automatic visa revalidation.
