= Student and Exchange Visitor Program =

Program to manage foreign students and exchange visitors in the United States

The Student and Exchange Visitor Program (SEVP) is a program within U.S. Immigration and Customs Enforcement (ICE), which is under the U.S. Department of Homeland Security (DHS), to manage foreign students and exchange visitors in the United States through the Student and Exchange Visitor Information System (SEVIS). The SEVP encompasses the F status (for foreign students in the United States in academic programs and their dependents), J status (for exchange visitors in the United States and their dependents), and M status (for foreign students in the United States in vocational programs and their dependents). The exchange visitor part of the program (J visa) is managed by the U.S. Department of State, although the SEVIS system is maintained by ICE.

The SEVP does not manage the issuance of the visas themselves. Visas are issued at United States consulates and embassies in other countries, which fall under the U.S. Department of State's Bureau of Consular Affairs. However, having the correct status and information in the SEVIS system is necessary for a person to be able to receive a F, J, or M visa.

The SEVP does not cover some other statuses that can be used by foreign students in the United States, such as the H-4 status and other statuses for dependents of people in non-student statuses.

== Jargon ==
Plain English description	Jargon for F status (students in academic programs)	Jargon for M status (students in vocational program)	Jargon for J status (exchange visitor)
Organization responsible for managing the program	U.S. Immigration and Customs Enforcement (ICE)	ICE	Department of State
Document that the student/exchange visitor has to demonstrate valid status	I-20	I-20	DS-2019
Visa status for the student or exchange visitor	F-1	M-1	J-1
Visa status for dependent	F-2	M-2	J-2
Visa status for border commuter	F-3	M-3	--
Designation of principal person at school or institution responsible for coordinating the program	Principal Designated School Official (PDSO)	PDSO	Responsible Official (RO)
Designation of other people at school or institution responsible for coordinating the program	Designated School Official (DSO)	DSO	Alternate Responsible Official (ARO)
Employment that can be undertaken during and after the main work as a student or exchange visitor	Curricular Practical Training (CPT) and Optional Practical Training (OPT)	OPT	Academic Training (AT)

== History ==
=== Pre-origins: CIPRIS ===
In the 1993 World Trade Center bombing, a truck bomb was detonated below the North Tower of the World Trade Center in New York City. In the aftermath of this incident, the student visa came under increased scrutiny when it was discovered that Eyad Ismoil, one of the terrorists involved was in the United States on an expired student visa.

A memorandum from the U.S. Department of Justice's Office of Investigative Agency Policies to the Deputy Attorney General dated September 24, 1994, mentioned the need to subject foreign students to thorough and continuing scrutiny before and during their stay in the United States. On April 17, 1995, the Deputy Attorney General asked the Immigration and Naturalization Service(INS) Commissioner to address this issue. This led to an INS task force in June 1995 to conduct a comprehensive review of the F, M, and J visa processes. Besides the INS, the task force included members from the State Department and the United States Information Agency, and experts in the administration of international student programs. The task force report, issued on December 22, 1995, identified problems in the tracking and monitoring of students by schools, problems in the certification of schools by the INS, and problems with INS receiving and maintaining up-to-date records from schools. As a result of these findings, the Illegal Immigration Reform and Immigrant Responsibility Act of 1996 directed the Attorney General, in consultation with the Secretary of State, to develop and conduct a program to collect certain information on nonimmigrant foreign students and exchange visitors from approved institutions of higher education and designated exchange visitor programs.

In June 1997, the INS launched a pilot program for a centralized electronic reporting system for institutions, called the Coordinated Interagency Partnership Regulating International Students (CIPRIS). The CIPRIS pilot officially ended in October 1999, as the INS felt it had gathered enough data from the prototype to start working on the nationwide system. The INS began working on a new system that would be called the Student and Exchange Visitor Program (SEVP) with the associated information system called the Student and Exchange Visitor Information Service (SEVIS). During the rollout, CIPRIS and SEVIS met with considerable opposition from the Association of International Educators and the American Council on Education. However, they claimed that the opposition was not against the programs in principle but due to the concern that a botched rollout by the INS could result in many students suffering.

=== Launch after the September 11 attacks ===
In the aftermath of the September 11 attacks (September 11, 2001) and the Patriot Act passed in response (October 26, 2001), there was further increase in scrutiny of student visas, increasing the momentum in favor of the adoption of SEVIS. This was partly because one of the attackers, Hani Hanjour, had come to the United States on a student visa.

Below is a timeline of the key events in the two years after the attacks describing the key steps in the evolution of SEVIS:

Date	Type of action	Title and reference
October 26, 2001	Final legislation	Patriot Act; mandates implementation of Section 641 of the IIRIRA
May 16, 2002	Proposed rule	Retention and reporting requirements for F, J, and M nonimmigrants; Student and Exchange Visitor Information System
July 1, 2002	Interim final rule	Allowing eligible schools to apply for preliminary enrollment in SEVIS
September 11, 2002	Implementation deadline	The Interim Student and Exchange Authentication System (ISEAS), an interim program by the U.S. Department of State, comes into force. This is a temporary system put in place until SEVIS goes live.
September 25, 2002	Interim final rule	Requiring certification of all service-approved schools for SEVIS enrollment
December 11, 2002	Interim final rule	Retention and reporting of information for F, J, and M nonimmigrants; SEVIS
January 31, 2003	Implementation deadline	Mandatory SEVIS use begins

=== History of release versions ===
SEVIS has undergone six major releases since its launch. The release is numbered using a major release version number followed by a dot and a minor release version number. Below is a partial list of release dates:

Version	Release date	Notes
5.10	August 8, 2008	New reprint reason, OPT can be added within 60 days of program end, two new country codes, updates to how change of status to H-1B works
6.0	February 20, 2009	CPT and OPT functionality, cap-gap support, student intern category for J status
6.1	November 6, 2009	Session timeouts after 20 minutes, checking for inactive emails (75 days or more) for designated school officials and responsible officers
6.2	February 27, 2010	
6.3	April 30, 2010	
6.4	July 10, 2010	Performance release; no functionality update
6.5	August 6, 2010	Data cleaning/migration. New payment tracking log for school payments, modification of the re-designation list and alert, display of the visa expiration date for Exchange Visitors and dependents. No functionality changes.
6.6	November 12, 2010	
6.7	April 22, 2011	
6.8	June 24, 2011	
6.9	October 27, 2011	
6.10	April 20, 2012	
6.11	December 7, 2012	
6.12	April 5, 2013	
6.13	May 24, 2013	
6.15	February 7, 2014	
6.16	April 18, 2014	
6.17	August 1, 2014	
6.18	October 31, 2014	
6.19	December 19, 2014	
6.20	April 24, 2015	
6.21	June 26, 2015	
6.22	August 21, 2015	
6.23	December 4, 2015	

During the first half of 2012, changes that affect all colleges, universities, and other educational institutions that provide English language training ("ESL") programs began. These changes stem from the Accreditation of English Language Training Act ("Accreditation Act"), which became effective in June 2011. Pursuant to the Accreditation Act, ESL programs that enroll foreign nonimmigrant students must obtain accreditation from a regional or national accreditation agency recognized by the United States Department of Education. The Accreditation Act applies to two types of ESL programs: Stand-Alone ESL Schools whose officials have indicated on the school's Form I-17 the intention to offer only ESL programs of study; and Combined Schools whose officials have indicated on the school's Form I-17 that the school offers an ESL program of study, as well as other programs of study. A Combined School may either contract out the ESL program of study or wholly own and operate the ESL program of study under the institution's governance.

=== Mandatory reporting requirements ===
Schools and programs approved to host students and scholars on these visas are required to report certain information. Information that must be reported includes:

- Change of legal name
- Change of U.S. address
- Change of major field of study
- Change of education degree level
- Change of funding
- Authorization for off-campus employment

In addition, they must report events that constitute a violation of the international visitor's visa status, such as academic suspension, criminal conviction, failure to enroll and unauthorized off-campus employment.

=== COVID-19 pandemic change ===
Amid the COVID-19 pandemic, the SEVP program allowed international students to take more online coursework in the spring and summer semesters of 2020 to accommodate the various state-mandated school closures and stay-at-home orders without penalizing the students. On July 6, 2020, ICE issued a regulation that stated that for any current international visitor under SEVP to remain in the country come the fall 2020 semesters, they must return to taking most of their coursework in person, limiting any online coursework to a maximum of one class or three credit hours online, or be enrolled in a hybrid system but still required to take some physical classes. Students failing to meet these would be face "immigration consequences including, but not limited to, the initiation of removal proceedings", and students who had indicated they would be taking only online classes would be denied visas.

The new change was criticized by students, schools, and states alike, as with the pandemic worsening in most of the United States at the time, many schools did not have plans to commit to opening to physical classes in the fall semester, leaving these international students at risk of deportation. At least three separate lawsuits were filed against ICE on the changed within the week on the basis that the decision was arbitrary and capricious and failed the Administrative Procedure Act: A joint suit by Harvard University and MIT, the state of California, and a separate collation of 17 states and the District of Columbia. Prior to a second hearing where it was expected that a preliminary injunction was to be placed on the new ruling on July 14, 2020, ICE affirmed it would rescind the new rule and continue to allow international students to participate in online classes.

=== 2025 revocation of Harvard's SEVP ===
In 2025, the Department of Homeland Security under the Trump administration announced the "revocation" of Harvard University's SEVP certification, banning the university from enrolling international students and forcing existing foreign students to transfer to other institutions. Harvard sued the Trump administration within 24 hours.

== Fee ==
=== Fee for students and exchange visitors ===
In 2004, the United States Congress mandated that all international students and exchange visitors pay the I-901 SEVIS fee, which funds the Student and Exchange Visitor Program (SEVP) and SEVIS. The fee can be paid online at fmjfee.com. As of June 24, 2019, the fees are as follows:

Category	Fee in current United States dollars
F or M visa applicant (full payment)	350
J visa applicant (full payment)	220
J visa applicant (subsidized payment)	35
Government visitor	0

The SEVIS fee must be paid after receiving the initial document (I-20 or DS-2019) and is a prerequisite for obtaining the F, J, or M visa, or if transitioning to student status using Form I-539.

The fee needs to be paid only for the principal (the F-1, J-1, or M-1). Dependents (F-2, J-2, and M-2) do not need to pay the fee. Also, the fee needs to be paid only once per initial SEVIS record, and in particular, does not need to be paid again if applying for a new visa on the same status. It is distinct from the visa fees, which need to be paid for each visa application.

=== Fee for schools seeking SEVP certification ===
Below is the list of fees for schools seeking SEVP certification (through Form I-17) or re-certification, as of January 2017.

Category	Fee in current USD	Notes
Petition for initial SEVP certification	1700	Previously only $230.
Site visit (per campus)	655	Previously $350 per campus.
Petition for change of ownership for already certified institution	1700	Previously only $230.
Site visit (per campus) for already certified institution	655	Previously $350 per campus.
Re-certification	0	

== See also ==
- U.S. Customs and Border Protection
