= Michael C. Kostelnik =

United States Air Force general

Michael Kostelnik
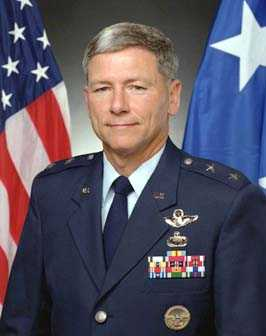
- Kostelnik in 2001
- Born: c. 1950 (age c. 74)
- Allegiance: United States
- Alma mater: Texas A&M University (BS); University of Iowa (MS)

Michael C. Kostelnik, Major General, USAF (Ret.; born c. 1950) was the Assistant Commissioner, Office of Air and Marine, U.S. Customs and Border Protection before retiring from federal service.

Kostelnik, a member of the Senior Executive Service, has worked for 35 years in the government. From 2002 to 2005, he served as the Deputy Associate Administrator for Space Station and Space Shuttle at the National Aeronautics and Space Administration (NASA). Previously, he spent 32 years on active military duty with the U.S. Air Force as a test pilot, instructor pilot, program manager and commander. He has had a career in both management and aviation, accumulating over 3,300 hours of flight time in over 40 types of aircraft. General Kostelnik has management experience in requirements, development and acquisition, and testing of leading edge aerospace systems.

He graduated from Texas A&M University with a Bachelor of Science degree in mechanical engineering in 1969. The following year, he completed a Master of Science degree in industrial and management engineering from the University of Iowa.

Kostelnik has been recognized with numerous awards, including the Defense Distinguished Service Medal, Air Force Distinguished Service Medal, Legion of Merit, the Meritorious Service Medal with two oak leaf clusters, Air Force Commendation Medal with oak leaf cluster, and the NASA Medal for Outstanding Leadership.
