= Automatic visa revalidation =

Automatic visa revalidation is one of a handful of exceptions to the general rule that a person who is not a United States citizen or lawful permanent resident can only lawfully enter the United States if he/she has a valid visa. According to automatic visa revalidation, people on some non-immigrant visa statuses who visit Canada, Mexico or some adjacent islands close to the United States for a period of less than 30 days can re-enter the United States based on a valid Form I-94 even if their visa has expired.

== Rules ==
A person is eligible for automatic visa revalidation provided the following conditions are met:

- The underlying authorization for the current status continues to be valid (such as the Form I-129 for non-immigrant workers or Form I-20 for students in F status).
- The person’s absence from the United States was 30 days or less.
- The person did not visit any countries other than Mexico or Canada in that period. People on F visa or J visa statuses are also allowed to have visited adjacent islands to the United States (i.e., the Caribbean Islands).
- The person does not have a pending (or rejected) application for a new visa. Since it is not possible to renew a non-immigrant visa in the United States a person on a non-immigrant visa may travel to a nearby country to apply for a new visa. However, such a person becomes ineligible for automatic visa revalidation based on the rules, so automatic visa revalidation cannot be used as a fallback option for somebody trying to renew an expired visa.
- The person is not a citizen of one of the countries designated by the US as a state sponsor of terrorism. As of 2018, the list includes four countries: North Korea (designated November 20, 2017), Iran (designated January 19, 1984), Sudan (designated December 29, 1979), and Syria (designated August 12, 1993).

== Similar exceptions ==
- The Visa Waiver Program allows nationals of 40 countries to enter the United States without visas, but they can enter only for short-term business/tourism trips, under conditions similar to those governing B visas.
- Some people currently in the United States can apply for advance parole that allows them to leave and re-enter the United States without a valid visa. Advance parole is not a generic re-entry permit.

== Relation with change of status ==
Automatic visa revalidation also applies to cases where the applicant never acquired a visa for his or her current non-immigrant status but rather transitioned through it by filing the appropriate form to change non-immigrant status (such as Form I-129 or Form I-539). Instead of the "visa", what gets revalidated is the change of status, and therefore in lieu of the visa the applicant must carry the Form I-797 Approval Notice in addition to all the other supporting documentation. In particular, it does not matter if the applicant has never acquired a visa for the new status.
