= Form I-94 =

U.S. Customs and Border Protection form for arrival, departure of non-residents

Form I-94, the Arrival-Departure Record Card, is a form used by U.S. Customs and Border Protection (CBP) intended to keep track of the arrival and departure to/from the United States of people who are not United States citizens or lawful permanent residents (with the exception of those who are entering using the Visa Waiver Program or Compact of Free Association, using Border Crossing Cards to border zones in less than 30 days, re-entering via automatic visa revalidation, or entering temporarily as crew members). While the form is usually issued by CBP at ports of entry or deferred inspection sites, USCIS can issue an equivalent as part of the Form I-797A approval notice for a Form I-129 petition for an alien worker or a Form I-539 application for extension of stay or change of status (in the case that the alien is already in the United States).

== Issuance for arriving aliens ==
The responsibility of issuing Form I-94 is with the CBP Office of Field Operations (OFO), a subdivision of U.S. Customs and Border Protection (CBP), that processes entries and exits at ports of entry (land, sea, and air) as well as deferred inspection sites. Note that OFO is distinct from the United States Border Patrol, whose responsibility is to patrol the rest of the border to monitor for unauthorized border-crossing.

=== At a port of entry ===
The most common place of issue of Form I-94 is at ports of entry, including airports, sea ports, and land ports. The form is issued electronically at air, sea and land ports of entry.

For air and sea travel, the process begins even before the alien has departed for the United States: the alien's air and sea carrier collect information about the alien (such as passport number) and send this information to CBP.

At the port of entry, the arriving alien is screened by an officer from the CBP Office of Field Operations. If the CBP officer is convinced, based on the alien's documentation and all other evidence submitted, that the alien can be admitted into the United States, the officer issues a Form I-94 to the alien.

At air, land and sea ports, the I-94 is issued digitally, and the alien is not issued a stamp or a paper I-94 form. The I-94 can be retrieved at any time using an online retrieval tool. However, in September 2016, CBP announced that land travelers who inform the CBP in advance and pay a $6 fee can get electronic Form I-94s issued at land ports of entry.

=== At a deferred inspection site ===
In some cases, the officer at the port of entry may not be able to make a decision as to whether to admit the alien. This could be due to missing documentation, need for further review of the case, need for a maintenance of status and departure bond, or other similar reasons. In this case, the port of entry can issue the alien a Form I-546, asking the alien to complete the process at a deferred inspection site, as well as a temporary Form I-94, with expiration date at most 30 days in the future. The process of admission of the alien and issuance of a long-term Form I-94 is then completed at the deferred inspection site.

Deferred inspection sites can also be used to correct errors in Form I-94s issued at ports of entry.

=== Exceptional cases where a Form I-94 is not issued ===
Form I-94 is only issued to people who are not United States citizens or permanent residents. Among these, it is not issued in the following cases:

- For people from Mexico with Border Crossing Cards, if they are entering by land and plan to travel only a few miles into the United States for a short period of time. In case of longer durations of stay or travel deeper into the United States, the alien should obtain a Form I-94 at the (land) port of entry.
- For people entering via the Visa Waiver Program (VWP). Historically, the CBP recorded arrival and departures under the VWP using Form I-94W. However, the I-94W is no longer used. It has been deprecated since 2010.
- For people entering the United States from one of the countries in the Compact of Free Association. These people may be issued a Form I-94A.
- For people re-entering the United States using automatic visa revalidation. In this case, the new entry is considered to have occurred using the I-94 issued at the previous entry, and a new Form I-94 is not issued.
- For crew members of air and sea vessels landing in the United States. These people are issued a Form I-95 instead.

=== USCIS Form I-94 ===
In case of an extension of stay or change of nonimmigrant status within the United States, the USCIS can issue its equivalent of Form I-94 as part of the I-797A approval notice. This applies to two main types of forms:

- Form I-129, Petition for a Nonimmigrant Worker, which can be used by a person already in the United States with authorization to change status to a temporary worker status. Note that Form I-129 can also be used by people currently outside the United States, but in that case, a Form I-797B approval notice is issued instead, and this does not include a Form I-94. Rather, in this case, the approval notice is used to obtain a temporary work visa, that the alien then uses to enter the United States and get a Form I-94 from CBP at the port of entry.
- Form I-539, Application to Extend/Change Nonimmigrant Status, which is used to change nonimmigrant status or extend one's stay on an existing status (beyond the expiration date of the Form I-94). An approval of Form I-539 is always accompanied by the USCIS issuing a new Form I-94.

Note that for students on an F visa, the I-94's expiration date is listed as "D/S", for duration of status. Thus, stay is extended by having the student's SEVIS record updated and a new I-20 issued, without a new Form I-94 being issued.

== History ==
=== Automation at sea and air ports in 2013 ===
The switch away from paper Form I-94 to electronic Form I-94 was carried out in 2013. The change to I-94 definition to allow for the electronic format was recorded in the Federal Register on March 27, 2013.

The rollout schedule was as follows:

- April 30: Chicago O'Hare, Charlotte Douglas, Orlando International, Las Vegas, Miami International, and Houston's Bush Intercontinental.
- May 7: Major air and sea ports corresponding to field offices in New York City, Boston, Buffalo, Baltimore, Detroit, Atlanta, Tampa, Puerto Rico, Miami, Chicago, New Orleans, and Houston.
- May 14: Major air and sea ports corresponding to field offices in San Francisco, Tucson, Arizona, El Paso, Texas, Seattle, Portland, Oregon (including Alaska), Los Angeles, San Diego, and Laredo, Texas.
- May 21: All remaining air and sea ports.

=== Availability of online history ===
On April 30, 2014, CBP announced a new retrieval tool that travelers could use to obtain their travel history and print their most recent Form I-94.

=== Availability at land ports starting late 2016 ===
In September 2016, CBP announced the availability of electronic Form I-94 at land ports for travelers who registered in advance and paid a $6 fee.

== See also ==
- Form I-539
- Electronic System for Travel Authorization
- Visa Waiver Program
- Automatic visa revalidation
