= Curricular Practical Training =

Temporary employment authorization for foreign students in the US

Curricular Practical Training (CPT) is a form of temporary employment authorization available to non-immigrant foreign students in the United States who hold F-1 student status. It allows an eligible student to take part in employment, an internship, cooperative education, work-study, or another required practicum that is directly related to the student’s major field of study and is an integral part of the school’s established curriculum.

A sample Form I-20, the document on which CPT authorization is endorsed by a designated school official.

CPT is one of the two principal forms of practical training available to F-1 students, the other being Optional Practical Training (OPT). Unlike OPT, which generally requires an application to United States Citizenship and Immigration Services and issuance of an Employment Authorization Document, CPT is authorized by the student’s school through its Student and Exchange Visitor Program procedures.

Authorization is granted by a designated school official (DSO), who records the authorization in the Student and Exchange Visitor Information System (SEVIS) and issues the student an updated Form I-20. The authorization must specify whether the training is full-time or part-time, the employer, the location of employment, and the approved start and end dates. A student may begin CPT only after receiving the Form I-20 bearing the DSO’s endorsement.

In general, F-1 students must have been lawfully enrolled on a full-time basis for one full academic year at an approved SEVP-certified college, university, conservatory, or seminary before becoming eligible for practical training. Federal regulations provide an exception for graduate students whose programs require immediate participation in curricular practical training. Students in English-language training programs are not eligible for practical training.

CPT may be authorized for part-time or full-time training. Students who receive one year or more of full-time CPT become ineligible for post-completion OPT at the same educational level; part-time CPT does not trigger that bar. CPT authorization is employer-specific and date-specific, and it is not a general work permit.

Use of CPT has grown with the expansion of international student enrollment and practical-training programs in the United States. In 2024, U.S. Immigration and Customs Enforcement reported 140,775 SEVIS IDs with authorization to participate in CPT, compared with 340,066 for OPT and 165,524 for STEM OPT.

== CPT Employment Authorization Statistics ==
2007-2021 CPT Employment Authorizations of Foreign Students
| Year | Number of Foreign Students on CPT |
|---|---|
| 2007 | 57,403 |
| 2008 | 61,171 |
| 2009 | 48,568 |
| 2010 | 57,409 |
| 2011 | 63,911 |
| 2012 | 68,482 |
| 2013 | 76,223 |
| 2014 | 92,528 |
| 2015 | 111,135 |
| 2016 | 122,529 |
| 2017 | 132,380 |
| 2018 | 151,525 |
| 2019 | 116,338 |
| 2020 | 97,368 |
| 2021 | 91,352 |
| 2022 | 129,849 |

American technology and financial firms, along with semiconductor companies, are major employers of CPT students. Amazon is the largest user of the CPT program, with 9,302 participating students between 2003-2019. Intel is the second largest user of the CPT program, with 6,453 students participating, while Microsoft is the third largest user of the program, with 6,340 students.

2003-2019 Total CPT Authorizations by Employer
| Top 10 CPT Student Employers | Foreign Students Employed on CPT Between 2003-2019 |
|---|---|
| Amazon | 9,302 |
| Intel Corporation | 6,453 |
| Microsoft Corporation | 6,340 |
| Google | 6,132 |
| IBM | 4,721 |
| Deloitte | 3,870 |
| Facebook | 3,810 |
| Qualcomm Technologies, Inc | 3,371 |
| Ernst & Young | 2,929 |
| Goldman Sachs | 2,867 |

2019 CPT Authorizations by Employer
| Top 10 CPT Student Employers | Foreign Students Employed on CPT in 2019 |
|---|---|
| Amazon | 2,086 |
| Google | 1,158 |
| Facebook | 1,090 |
| Microsoft Corporation | 730 |
| Deloitte | 672 |
| Intel Corporation | 530 |
| Cummins | 346 |
| IBM | 340 |
| Populus Group | 333 |
| Apple | 323 |

== Criticism ==
=== Employer Discount ===
Students working with CPT authorization do not pay Social Security and Medicare taxes if they have been in the United States for less than five years. For employers, hiring a CPT worker amounts to a 15.3% discount per student compared to an American citizen or permanent resident. Employers also avoid paying payroll taxes and do not have to provide health insurance to CPT students.

=== Lack of Government Oversight ===
Government officials have criticized the program because neither USCIS nor U.S. Immigration and Customs Enforcement have a direct role in determining whether the CPT work authorization is an “integral part of a curriculum."

=== Lack in Transparency ===
Detractors of the CPT program has criticized it for being non-transparent.

=== Career Placement ===
Critics have said the program provides entry-level career opportunities to foreign students while not doing the same for American college students.

=== Diploma Mill Colleges ===
Many have criticized CPT for incentivizing diploma mill universities.

In 2020, Immigration and Customs Enforcement set up the University of Farmington and arrested 250 foreign students for knowingly enrolling in the papermill college, which lacked teachers or classes. Many of the students enrolled in CPT to immediately gain work authorization in the U.S.
