= Educaedu =

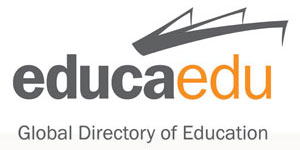
- Company type: Private
- Industry: Internet
- Founded: 2001
- Headquarters: Bilbao, Spain
- Key people: Fernando Bacaicoa and Mikel Castaños (Co-founders)
- Products: educaedu.com,tumaster.com, buscaoposiciones.com,canalcursos.com
- Website: educaedu.com

Educaedu is an online education directory where students can search for higher education programs around the world. Founded in 2001, Educaedu originally started in Spain with three Web sites (Busca Opposiciones, Tu Master and Canal Cursos). In January 2008, Educaedu expanded the directory and launch Educaedu on a global to cover other countries. It now operates in 20 countries and 9 different languages.
