= I-20 (form) =

U.S. Department of Homeland Security form

The Form I-20 (formally the Certificate of Eligibility for Nonimmigrant Student Status) is a United States Department of Homeland Security document issued by schools certified by the Student and Exchange Visitor Program (SEVP), a program administered by U.S. Immigration and Customs Enforcement (ICE). It is used for non-immigrant students and dependents in the F and M visa categories, including F-1 academic and language students, F-2 dependents, M-1 vocational students, and M-2 dependents.

A Form I-20 is issued after a student has been accepted by an SEVP-certified school and the school has entered the student’s information into the Student and Exchange Visitor Information System (SEVIS). The form contains identifying information about the student, the school, the program of study, expected start and end dates, estimated costs, funding information, the school code, and the student's SEVIS identification number. The student and the school official are required to sign the form.

The Form I-20 is not itself a visa and does not by itself grant admission to the United States. Instead, it is used as supporting documentation for several immigration-related purposes. After receiving the form and registering in SEVIS, a prospective student may apply for an F or M student visa at a U.S. Department of State embassy or consulate. The student must present the Form I-20 during the visa interview and again to U.S. Customs and Border Protection when requesting admission at a U.S. port of entry.

Each F-2 or M-2 dependent, such as a spouse or minor child accompanying the student, must receive a separate Form I-20 from the student’s SEVP-certified school. Dependents use their own Forms I-20 when applying for dependent visas and when seeking admission to the United States.

The form is also used after arrival in the United States to document a student's SEVIS record and immigration status. Updated Forms I-20 may be issued for changes such as a new program end date, school transfer, change of education level, travel endorsement, or authorization for certain forms of student employment, including Curricular Practical Training and recommendations for Optional Practical Training.

The equivalent eligibility document for J-1 exchange visitors and J-2 dependents is Form DS-2019, which is issued by a United States Department of State-designated exchange visitor program rather than by an SEVP-certified school.

Form I-20, Certificate of Eligibility for Nonimmigrant (F-1) Student Status-For Academic and Language Students

== Structure ==
=== Current structure of I-20 ===
The I-20 was updated starting June 2015, with all new I-20s issued using the new format starting June 26, 2015, and the new I-20 necessary for all students seeking entry or re-entry starting July 2016. The main reason for the update to the form was the standardization of names in SEVIS. The changes include:

- More prominence to the SEVIS number.
- Better separation of student information from dependent information.
- Expandable field boxes that display information about cap gap extension, change of status, event history and other authorizations.
- General design improvements that include moving the instructions to the third page of the Form I-20, as well as the removal of the barcode, and the blocks for visa and port of entry information.
- The new Request Mass Reprint functionality that allows DSOs to reprint Forms I-20 for multiple students at a time.

The new Form I-20 is three pages long. Each dependent gets an additional three pages, with the same format.

Page 1 contains the following:

- The SEVIS ID (printed in bold on top)
- Student's biographical information: various kinds of names, countries of birth and citizenship, and date of birth
- The class of admission (F-1 or M-1; in case of additional pages added for dependents, the class of admission is F-2 or M-2)
- School information (school name, school address, school SEVIS code, and name of the DSO)
- Information about the program of study: Program name, education level, normal program length, start and end date, English proficiency
- Financial information for the first year of studies, with one column for estimated funding costs and another column for funding sources
- Remarks
- School attestation, signed and dated by the DSO
- Student attestation, signed and dated by the student

Page 2 contains the following (this is information that appeared on Page 3 in the previous I-20):

- Employment authorization (such as for Optional Practical Training or Curricular Practical Training)
- Information on change of status or the cap-gap extension (for post-completion OPT)
- Event history (as a table)
- Other authorizations (as a table)
- Travel signatures

In the case of long event histories, Page 2 could spill over to multiple pages.

Page 3 contains instructions.

=== Structure of I-20 until June 2015 ===
The Form I-20 used until June 2015 has three pages, of which the second page was an instructions page, so that only the first and third pages contained information specific to the student's SEVIS record.

Page 1 contains the following:

- SEVIS number
- Student's biographical information (name, country of birth, country of citizenship)
- Information about the school and Designated School Official who needs to be informed upon the student's arrival
- The student's degree program, reporting date, and program end date.
- How the student intends to meet his/her first year of expenses.
- Name and signature of the DSO, along with the date.
- Name and signature of the student, along with the date.

Page 3 includes the following:

- The student's name
- Information on any work authorization, including Optional Practical Training and Curricular Practical Training
- A section for travel signatures. A travel signature at most 1 year old is necessary whenever re-entering the United States

An additional Page 4 may be included for information on the student's dependents, if any.

== Overall role ==
=== SEVP-certified institution ===
The Form I-20 is issued by a Designated School Official (DSO) at the institution (college, university, or vocational school). Only institutions that are SEVP-certified can issue Form I-20s. An institution can acquire SEVP certification by filing Form I-17 with U.S. Immigration and Customs Enforcement (this is a one-time process). Note that an institution can be SEVP-certified despite not holding national or regional accreditation. Conversely, an institution may hold national or regional accreditation but may have chosen not to obtain SEVP certification if it does not intend to admit international students in the F, J, or M status.

A large university typically has an international office that manages its participation in the SEVP, and all the DSOs work for this office. The international office manages updates to the SEVIS record and issuing of new paper Form I-20s. Students who have any change to their plans (such as program end date, course load, leave of absence, return from leave of absence) must communicate these changes with their international office.

=== Student SEVIS record and Form I-20 ===
At the time the first Form I-20 is issued to the student (after accepting the offer of admission from the institution) a record is created for the student in the Student and Exchange Visitor Information System (SEVIS). At any given time, the responsibility for keeping the student's SEVIS record up to date falls with the SEVP-certified institution the student is currently enrolled in. If the student transfers to a different SEVP-certified institution, the responsibility of updating the SEVIS record now falls on the new institution.

The Form I-20 can be thought of as a paper representation of the most up-to-date SEVIS information on record for the student's current enrollment. Whenever there are substantive changes to the information, the SEVIS record is updated, and a new Form I-20 is issued to the student by the institution with the updated information. The student must use the most up-to-date Form I-20 when demonstrating student status.

== Process ==
=== Issuance of first Form I-20 ===
Once the prospective student has accepted the institution's offer of admission, the institution issues a Form I-20 to the student.

Apart from biographical information about the student (including the student's name, date of birth, citizenship, etc.), there are two main pieces of information that must be entered in the student's SEVIS record and the initial Form I-20.

- Program details: The program name, start date, and end date.
- How the student intends to meet tuition and living expenses for the first year the student is in the program, or until the end date indicated on the I-20, whichever is shorter.

Each international office may follow its own rules or guidelines regarding the type of documentation it requests from the student or from other departments in order to be able to issue the I-20. The jargon used for this documentation will also vary by institution. For instance, the University of Chicago and University of Michigan uses the term "Financial Resources Statement" for the statement that students need to submit to it regarding how they will meet their expenses, while the University of Illinois at Urbana–Champaign uses the term "Declaration & Certification of Finances for I-20/DS-2019 Application".

After receiving information from the student and institution regarding the program length and end date, the international office creates the student's SEVIS record, gets a SEVIS number for the student, and issues a Form I-20. A physical copy of the form may be mailed to the student overseas. In the case that the student has a SEVIS record from previous student status, the existing SEVIS record should be transferred.

The international office may refuse to issue a Form I-20 if the student is unable to demonstrate how he or she plans to cover expenses for the first year.

=== Use of Form I-20 while transitioning to student status ===
The Form I-20 is used in the following stages of the transition to student status in the United States:

- The SEVIS number on the I-20 is needed while paying the SEVIS fee.
- It is needed when applying for the F visa or M visa, both when filling the application form and during the interview.
- It is needed when seeking admission to the United States. At the time of admission, a valid visa as well as a valid I-20 are needed. At the time of initial entry, the officer at the port of entry checks that the program start date is at most 30 days ahead, and that the I-20 has a valid travel signature. It is also necessary that, at the time of initial entry, the school the student intends to attend matches the school on the student's visa and the student's I-20, though this is not a requirement in the future. The officer at the port of entry also issues a Form I-94 with expiration date indicated as "D/S" (Duration of Status), which means that the student is in authorized status in the United States until the program end date indicated on the I-20 (and can stay in the United States for up to 60 days after that).
- For those who are not seeking admission to the United States but simply changing status, a copy of the Form I-20 needs to be attached along with the Form I-539 application to change status.

For those entering the United States in student status, the date of entry to the United States is treated as the start date for the student being in the F or M student status (even if this is before the program start date). For those transitioning to student status from another status, the date of transition indicated on the Form I-539 is treated as the start date.

== Subsequent use of Form I-20 ==
=== Establishing legality of status and stay ===
The Form I-20 serves as evidence of the legality of the student's current presence in the United States. Note that a valid visa is not necessary for being in lawful student status; a valid visa is only needed when entering or re-entering the United States.

=== Documentation of student status for United States government purposes ===
The Form I-20 may be used to demonstrate student status when applying for United States government documents and benefits such as Individual Taxpayer Identification Number (ITIN) and Social Security Number. It is also required to demonstrate authorization to work for students on Curricular Practical Training.

=== Travel and travel signatures ===
Whenever the student re-enters the United States after traveling, the student must have all of these at the time of arrival at the port of entry:

- A valid passport (valid for at least six more months)
- A valid F or M visa
- A valid I-20 (i.e., an I-20 whose program end date has not yet arrived)
- A travel signature on the I-20 (page 3) from the DSO that is at most one year old (six months in the case of students currently on post-completion Optional Practical Training)

Since travel signatures are valid for only a year, students need to periodically get updated travel signatures on their I-20 from their international student office. The purpose of this requirement is to avoid cases where people who are no longer enrolled as students at an institution keep using an outdated Form I-20 to get in. In particular, when adding a new travel signature to the OPT, it is the responsibility of the international student office to make sure that the student is still enrolled at the institution. In case the Form I-20 runs out of space for travel signatures, the international office may print out a new Form I-20 for the student.

In the special case of automatic visa revalidation, whereby the student returns to the United States after a trip to Canada, Mexico, or a nearby island for at most 30 days, it is not necessary to have a valid visa at the time of re-entry. However, it is still necessary to have a valid Form I-20 and a travel signature.

== Changes to Form I-20 ==
In general, whenever there are changes to the information in Form I-20, a new Form I-20 is issued. The student is advised to keep all historical Forms I-20 for the record but only the most recent copy should be used for travel or as proof of current student status.

=== Changing the program end date ===
It may happen that the student's actual program end date falls earlier or later than what the student expected. It is necessary that a new I-20 be issued reflecting the current program end date, both prior to the program's actual end and prior to the stated program end date on the Form I-20.

If the Form I-20 is being shortened, the international office may require the student to submit evidence showing that the student has enough academic credits to graduate early. If the Form I-20 is being extended, then, in addition to any evidence from the student about changed academic plans, the international office also needs an updated statement of financial resources for the new I-20 to cover up to one year of the I-20 extension.

After the change to the program end date is made in the student's SEVIS record, the new Form I-20 is issued to the student.

The program end date on the Form I-20 need not coincide with the graduation date. Rather, it is the end date of the student's enrollment in courses. It is not possible to extend the program end date simply in order to be able to stay around till the graduation ceremony. If the graduation ceremony falls outside the 60-day grace period of completion of coursework, then the student must find some other way to be legally present for it (for instance, by staying around on Optional Practical Training, or getting a B visa for the graduation ceremony).

=== Other changes ===
The following are some other types of major updates to the student's SEVIS record that require changes to the Form I-20. In all cases, the student must contact the international office beforehand and have a new I-20 issued in advance:

- Reduced Course Load: This means that the student is not enrolled as a full-time student. Reasons for granting RCL include final quarter/semester, medical condition, and academic difficulties. Academic difficulties in turn include improper course level placement, academic difficulties with the English language, or unfamiliarity with American teaching methods.
- Practical Training, including Optional Practical Training (pre-completion and post-completion) and Curricular Practical Training
- Leave of Absence and Withdrawal

== See also ==
- College admissions in the United States
- F-1 visa
- J-1 visa
- M-1 visa
