= M-2 visa =

U.S. dependent visa for those dependent on M-1 visa holders

The M-2 visa is a type of United States visa reserved for the spouse or child of an M-1 student.

An M-2 spouse may not work or engage in full-time schooling unless it is recreational. An M-2 child may engage in full-time schooling at the primary or secondary level.

== See also ==
- List of United States dependent visas
