= CBP Air and Marine Operations =

U.S. Customs and Border Protection Air and Marine Operations
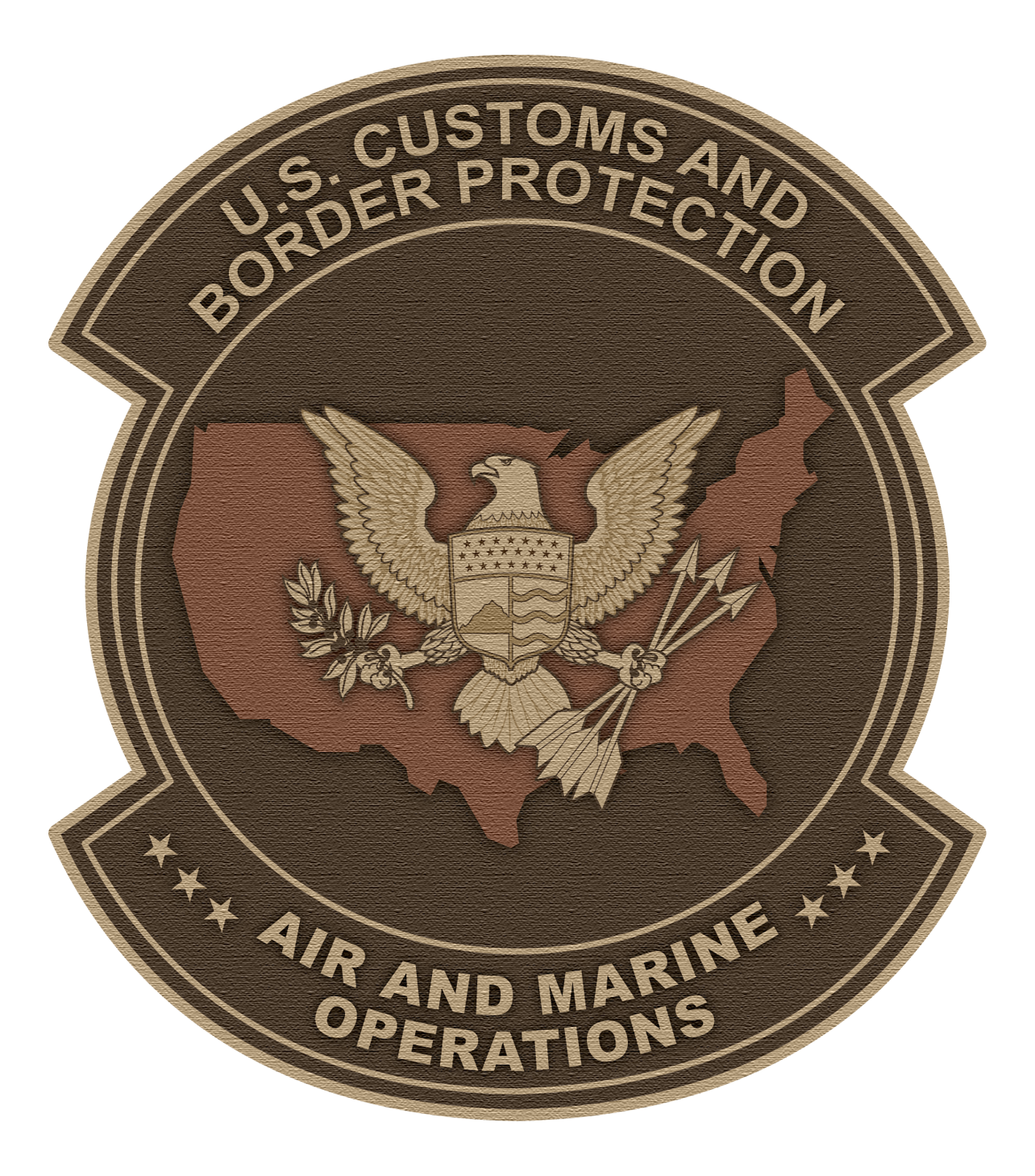
- Emblem of CBP Air and Marine Operations

- CBP racing stripe used on AMO aircraft and vessels

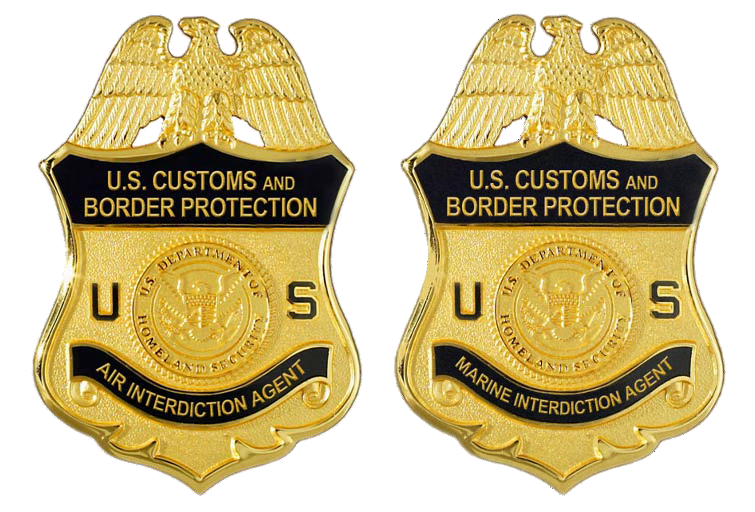
- Air and Marine Interdiction Agent Badges

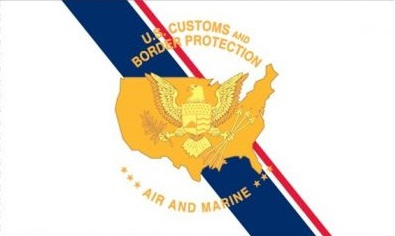
- Flag of CBP Air and Marine Operations

Agency overview
- Formed: January 17, 2006
- Preceding agencies: Aviation, maritime, and investigative resources of the United States Customs Service; Aviation resources of the United States Immigration and Naturalization Service; Aviation resources of the United States Border Patrol
- Employees: 1,843 (2011)
- Annual budget: $814.5 million (2011)

Jurisdictional structure
- Federal agency: United States
- Operations jurisdiction: United States
- Constituting instrument: Homeland Security Act of 2002
- General nature: Federal law enforcement

Operational structure
- Headquarters: Washington, D.C.
- Agency executive: Jonathan P. Miller, Executive Assistant Commissioner
- Parent agency: U.S. Customs and Border Protection

Air and Marine Operations (AMO, CBPAMO) is a federal law enforcement component within U.S. Customs and Border Protection (CBP), an agency of the United States Department of Homeland Security (DHS). AMO's mission is to protect the American people and nation's critical infrastructure through the coordinated use of air and marine assets to detect, interdict and prevent acts of terrorism and the unlawful movement of people, illegal drugs, and other contraband toward or across the borders of the United States. Air and Marine Operations Agents and Officers are endowed with the authority to enforce Title 8 (Aliens and Nationality) and Title 19 (Customs) of the United States Code in addition to the general law enforcement powers bestowed upon federal law enforcement agents.

This specialized law enforcement capability allows AMO to make significant contributions to the efforts of the Department of Homeland Security, as well as to those of other federal, state, local, and tribal agencies. AMO is uniquely positioned to provide direct air and maritime support to multiple agencies and to ensure the success of border protection and law enforcement operations between ports of entry, within the maritime domain and within the nation's interior. To accomplish its mission, AMO employs over 1,200 Federal Agents and Officers at 70 locations, operating more than 260 aircraft of 26 different types, and approximately 300 maritime vessels. It is one of the major operational components within U.S. Customs and Border Protection, along with the Office of Field Operations (OFO) and United States Border Patrol (USBP).

== History and Consolidation ==
- 1789 - The U.S. Customs Service (USCS) is established to aid in the protection of the revenue of the United States and to prevent the smuggling of contraband. A fleet of vessels begin to patrol the coastal waters of the United States. Congress authorized the Collector of Customs to acquire boats and hire boatsmen. These vessels and boatsmen were the forerunners of today's Midnight Express Interceptor vessels and Marine Interdiction Agents.
- 1808 - Boatsmen Asa March and Elis Drake became the first Customs officers to die in the line of duty. They gave their lives during a marine interdiction and subsequent gunfight on Lake Champlain in New York.
- 1922 - U.S. Customs Service Patrol began to use seized aircraft to enable aerial surveillance and enforcement.
- 1932 - A record-high 35 aircraft were seized for smuggling. This led to the establishment of an unofficial Customs Patrol Air Group. The new aerial surveillance effort focused on the southern U.S. border.
- 1941 - 31 December 1940 three Kellets Autogyros were transferred from the US Army to US Border Patrol. Greg Hathaway, Ned Henderson, and Ed Parker were Border Patrol Agents with flight experience who were sent to two military airfields for training. These YG-1B's went into US Border Patrol service upon completion of their flight training in May 1941. Although flight in support of the US Border Patrol mission had occurred before 1941, this was the official beginning of US Border Patrol Air Operations under then Chief of the US Border Patrol Willard F. Kelly.
- 1945 - In October 1945 the first L-5 observation Airplane was transferred from the US Army to US Border Patrol and pressed into service in El Paso, TX. In 1946 two more were placed in operation in El Centro and McAllen US Border Patrol Sectors.
- 1954 - US Border Patrol Air Transportation Operations began. First flight was a C-46, N1804M, ferried from Robbins AFB, Georgia to Chicago, Illinois. By the close of USBP Air Trans in 1972, 78,859 hours flown had resulted in 330,073,133 passenger miles.
- 1969 - The U.S. Customs Service officially established its aviation program, which became operational in 1971.
- 1973 - The U.S. Customs Service's marine program was established in its modern form within the USCS Office of Investigations.
- 1979 - In May the first OH-6 helicopter was obtained on loan from US Army to US Border Patrol. By 1997, USBP had 45 in operation.
- 1999 - The USCS Air and Marine Interdiction Division (AMID) was formed by merging the aviation and marine programs.
- March 1, 2003 - Pursuant to the Homeland Security Act of 2002, the U.S. Customs Service and Immigration and Naturalization Service (INS) were abolished, and their components were transferred to newly formed agencies within the Department of Homeland Security.
  The USCS Air and Marine Interdiction Division was transferred to Immigration and Customs Enforcement (ICE), becoming the Office of Air and Marine Operations (AMO).
  The U.S. Border Patrol with its aviation and marine assets was transferred from the Immigration and Naturalization Service to U.S. Customs and Border Protection, becoming the Office of Border Patrol.
- October 23, 2004 - ICE Air and Marine Operations was transferred to U.S. Customs and Border Protection due to political and budgetary disputes between ICE and CBP.
- October 1, 2005 - U.S. Customs and Border Protection integrated its Air and Marine Operations and Border Patrol aviation assets and personnel to more effectively accomplish its aviation missions, forming the Office of CBP Air.
- January 17, 2006 - U.S. Customs and Border Protection consolidated all aviation and marine assets under the newly titled Office of Air and Marine, which has the responsibility of providing training, creating standard operating procedures, as well as procuring and maintaining equipment for the entirety of CBP's aviation and marine programs. The purpose of these consolidations was to align air and marine law enforcement personnel and assets into one agency, enabling them to better accomplish the new homeland security mission.
- October 1, 2015 - U.S. Customs and Border Protection's Office of Air and Marine changed its name to Air and Marine Operations.
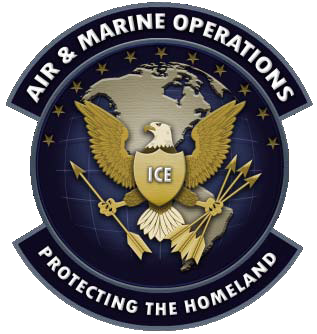

== Missions ==
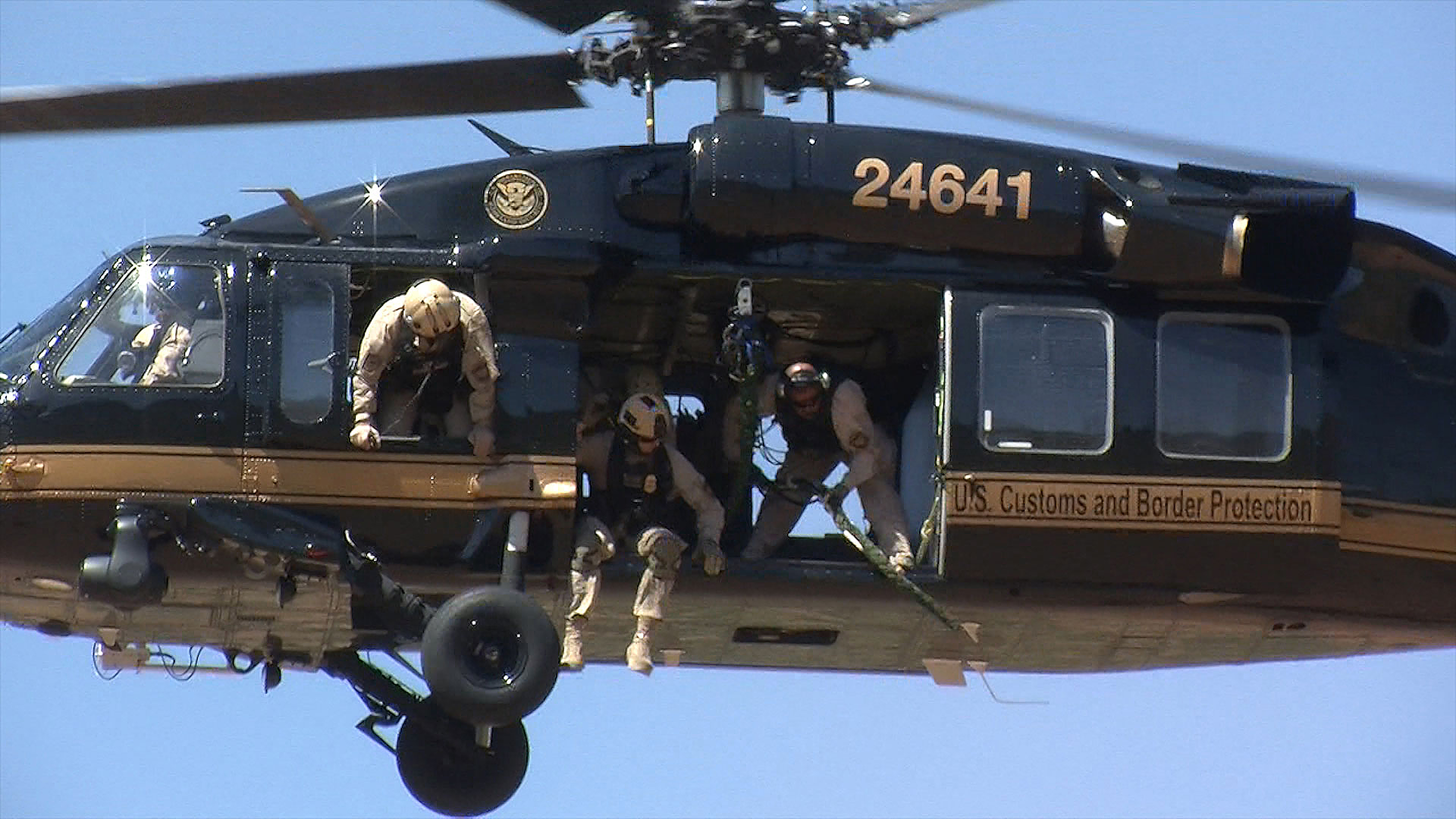
CBP conducting a rescue operation from a UH-60 Black Hawk.

Among AMO's many missions are anti-terrorism, countering smuggling, and stopping illegal immigration. The agency uses its aviation and marine assets to detect, interdict, and apprehend conveyances carrying terrorists, contraband, or undocumented aliens intending to enter the United States illegally. AMO Also leverages its unique detection and interdiction capabilities to support individual components of the Department of Homeland Security and Department of Justice. Providing support to agencies and multi-jurisdictional task forces such as ICE Homeland Security Investigations, the United States Secret Service, Customs and Border Protection, the United States Coast Guard, the Federal Bureau of Investigation, National Special Security Events, and Joint Interagency Task Force South accounts for the bulk of AMO operations.

AMO uses a multitude of fixed and rotary wing aircraft, unarmed versions of military UAVs, as well as high speed blue water interceptors and utility vessels for strategic operations in high-risk areas. All CBP aviation missions are conducted by Air Interdiction Agents, while CBP maritime operations in the Great Lakes, territorial waters, and international waters are the responsibility of Marine Interdiction Agents. Patrol Agents from the Office of Border Patrol are responsible for conducting U.S. Customs and Border Protection's marine missions in the small lakes and rivers along the Mexico–US and Canada–US borders.

Air and Marine Operations Agents and Officers work with both U.S. and foreign agencies and military forces to support their law enforcement efforts. Personnel and assets are deployed abroad to support Department of Homeland Security priorities, most notably for foreign training and counter narcotics missions.

== Aviation resources ==
=== Fixed wing ===
==== Beechcraft King Air C-12 ====
The Beechcraft King Air, C-12B, C-12C, and C-12M maritime surveillance aircraft are all medium-range, twin turbo-prop aircraft used by CBP's Air and Marine Operations. These aircraft support investigation and enforcement efforts by conducting surveillance, tracking, and information gathering missions with equipment designed for those specific mission sets to include over water operations. Their secondary mission is the logistical relocation of personnel, equipment, or evidence that is time critical to investigation and enforcement actions. As an interdiction tracker, this aircraft can play a role in drug interdiction missions when accompanied by a C-550 Citation II or a P-3 aircraft flying as a radar platform or an interceptor.

==== Beechcraft Super King Air 350ER ====
The latest addition to the CBP Air and Marine Operations fleet of aircraft is the multi-purpose, fixed-wing, multi-engine Multi-Role Enforcement Aircraft (MEA). The MEA will perform marine interdiction, limited air-to-air interdiction, over land interdiction, and enforcement relocation of personnel and equipment. The MEA will also be configured to carry law enforcement technical collections equipment.

AMO's MEA, which will fly with a crew of four (two pilots and two sensor operators), will eventually replace AMO's current array of C-12M, PA-42, C-12C, and B-200 aircraft.

The MEA is equipped with state of the art sensor equipment for detection, tracking, and surveillance operations in regions where terrain, weather, and distance pose significant obstacles to border security operations. In addition, the MEA serves as a force multiplier for law enforcement and emergency personnel because it provides a rapid-response deployment capability.

==== Bombardier DHC-8Q200 ====
The Bombardier Dash 8 Q200 is a multirole patrol aircraft (MPA) equipped with multimode radar and electro-optical/infrared sensors that can detect and track maritime and surface targets. It can also be converted to a cargo configuration or into a 37-passenger aircraft, making it an ideal aircraft to respond to acts of terrorism, natural disasters and other emergencies.

The first AMO Dash 8 Q200 MPA was placed in service in August 2005 and was used extensively during the days following Hurricane Katrina to carry law enforcement officers, flight crews and other personnel, supplies and equipment to New Orleans. A second Dash 8 was delivered in mid 2006 and a third aircraft was delivered in February 2008. The fourth aircraft was delivered in December 2008.

AMO also utilizes Dash-8 Q300 MPAs. All AMO Dash-8's employ powerful surface search radar, cameras, advanced tracking software and other sensor equipment to secure America's maritime border. AMO's Dash-8's are widely recognized as some of the most capable and powerful maritime patrol aircraft in the world.

==== Cessna C-206 ====
The C-206 surveillance aircraft are short to medium-range piston-powered aircraft used by the Air and Marine Operations to support investigative and enforcement efforts by conducting surveillance, tracking, photographic and information gathering missions. Their secondary mission is the logistical relocation of personnel, equipment or evidence that are time critical to investigative and enforcement actions.

These surveillance aircraft, which fly with a crew of two (pilot and observer), are particularly effective platforms for law enforcement operations. They provide better range and endurance than helicopters and blend more effectively with local traffic to mask the presence of continuous air surveillance.

==== Lockheed P-3 Orion Long Range Tracker ====
The P-3 LRT aircraft are high-endurance, all-weather, tactical turbo-prop aircraft used by CBP Air and Marine to intercept and track airborne smuggling threats. With the escalation of terrorist threats and the commitment of Department of Defense P-3 Airborne Early Warning (AEW) aircraft in other regions of the world, AMO P-3s have assumed a significant role in Homeland Security efforts.

Key to the success of the P-3s are their endurance, small deployment footprint, and extensive sensor array. The aircraft can operate from most 8,000-foot runways and carries a crew of eight (pilot, copilot, flight engineer, and radar and sensor operators). The aircraft are supported by a ground maintenance team of only three people.

AMO P-3 LRT aircraft often fly in tandem with the P-3 AEW. Used in this manner, the P-3 AEW detects and tracks multiple targets and the accompanying P-3 LRT intercepts, identifies, and tracks those suspect targets.

==== Lockheed P-3 Orion Airborne Early Warning ====
The P-3 Airborne Early Warning (AEW) detection and monitoring aircraft are the only dedicated law enforcement AEW aircraft in the world. They were developed to provide wide area search, increased command control, and communications capabilities.

Air and Marine's P-3s are high-endurance, all-weather, tactical turbo-prop aircraft, which are used primarily for long-range patrols along the entire U.S. border, and in source and transit zone countries throughout Central and South America. The aircraft carries a crew of eight (pilot, copilot, flight engineer, and radar/sensor operators). They are routinely sent on temporary duty to support the United States and foreign government initiatives to stem smuggling into the United States. With the escalation of terrorist threats and the commitment of Department of Defense AEW assets in other regions of the world, Air and Marine P-3s have also assumed a significant role in Homeland Security efforts.

==== MQ-9 Predator B Unmanned Aircraft System ====
The MQ-9 Predator B Unmanned Aircraft System (UAS) is a force multiplier for CBP and its border security mission. AMO UASs began their service by supporting Border Patrol Agents and CBP Officers on the U.S./Mexico border. In January 2009, UAS operations began on the Canada–US border. In addition, the MQ-9 allows CBP to assist with non border related operations within other DHS organizations like the U.S. Coast Guard and the Federal Emergency Management Agency, such as search and rescue or disaster relief. AMO Works closely with the Department of Defense to gain efficiencies in acquisition, testing, training and deployment of the Predator B.

CBP selected the Predator B for its large payload and ability to remain in the air longer than other UASs. CBP's Air and Marine Operations Center (AMOC) at March Air Reserve Base in Riverside, CA provides liaison from the UAS to other agencies within and outside of CBP. Command and control of the UAS is through KU-band satellite communications.

The first CBP Predator took flight along the border with Mexico in October 2005. It crashed into a hillside near Nogales, Arizona in April 2006 after the contractor flying the aircraft shut down its engine mid-flight. An National Traffic and Safety Board investigation of the crash—the first ever investigation into an accident involving an unmanned aircraft—found a number of technical and operational problems with the CBP drone program.

==== Pilatus PC-12 ====
The PC-12 is a single-engine turbo-prop aircraft that combines the slow-speed capability of a Cessna 210 with the payload and high-speed capabilities of a B-200 King Air. These characteristics enable the Multirole Enforcement Aircraft to deploy rapidly and operate safely in remote areas.

These aircraft have enhanced the effectiveness and efficiency of CBP's Air and Marine Operations by providing:

- Increased mission versatility, including air interdiction, aerial surveillance and logistical support.
- Removable sensor consoles and retractable state of-the-art electro-optical and infrared (EO/IR) sensors.
- Reduced operating costs.

Key to the success of the PC-12s, which fly with a crew of two (pilot and sensor operator), are their endurance, small deployment footprint, and extensive sensor array. The aircraft have short-field capabilities of mission take-off in 2,300 ft and landing distance of 1,800 ft.

=== Rotary wing ===
==== Sikorsky S-76 ====
S-76 helicopters are medium-range, all-weather, tactical apprehension aircraft used by CBP's Air and Marine Operations to protect the American public from threats of terrorism and drug smuggling, and to enforce airspace security over critical venues.

AMO's S-76s, which usually fly with a crew of three (pilot, copilot, and crewmember), are large, powerful helicopters, which can carry all the equipment and personnel necessary for law enforcement operations without sacrificing range and speed. In addition, they are well suited to the all-weather hazardous environments in which AMO routinely operates.

==== American Eurocopter AS-350 A-Star ====
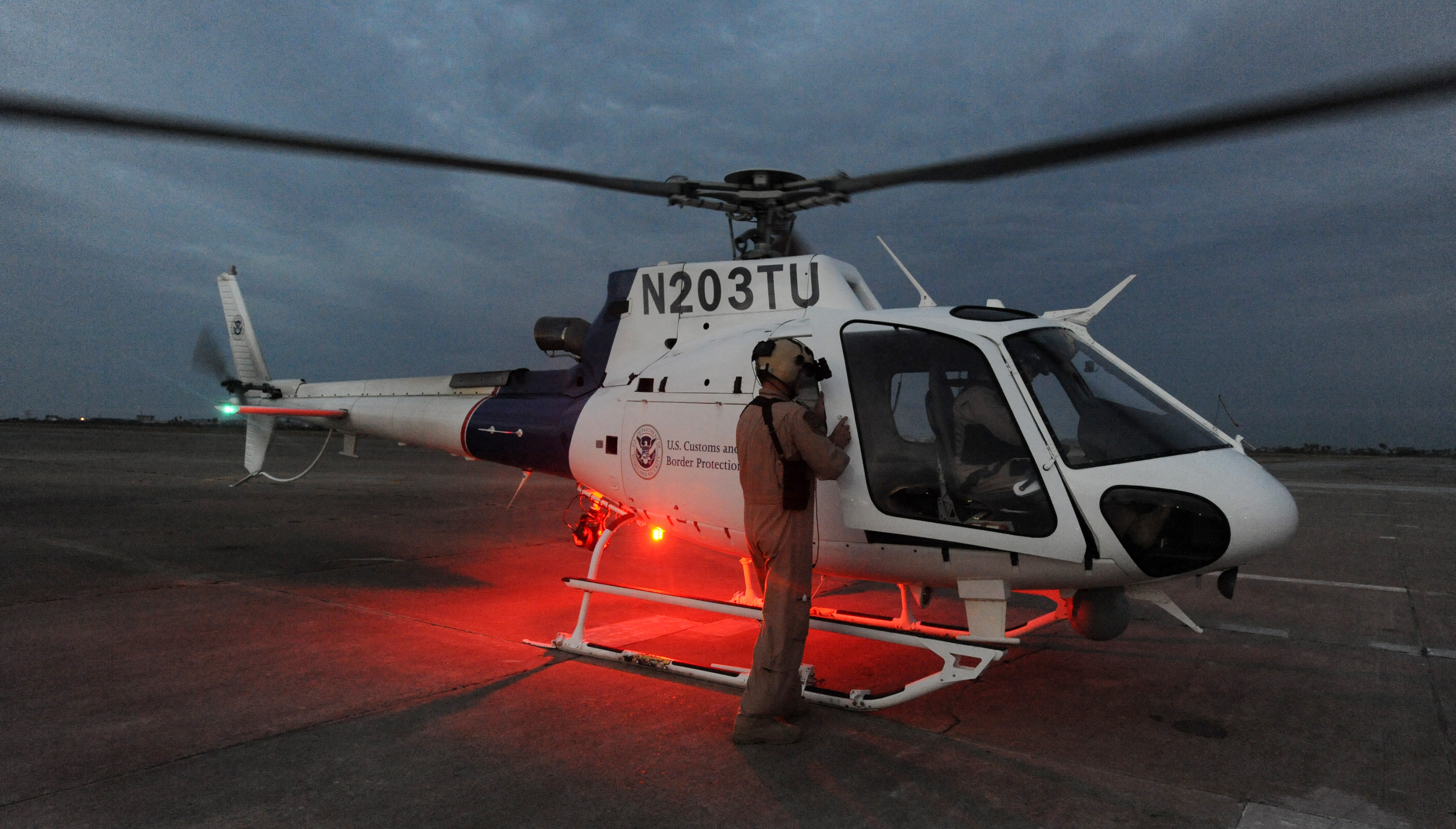
Eurocopter AS-350 A-Star.

The AS-350 Light Enforcement Helicopter (LEH) is a short-range, turbine-powered helicopter used by CBP's Office of Air and Marine to perform aerial reconnaissance of stationary or moving targets.

These LEHs are the optimal aerial surveillance platform in metropolitan areas because their vertical lift capability and maneuverability enable operations from off-airport sites and in close proximity to congested airports. EO/IR sensors and video downlink provide intelligence and communications support that enhance officer safety during high-risk operations and increase covertness during surveillance operations. Video recorders document suspect activities for evidentiary use. The AS-350s, which fly with a crew of two (pilot and observer), are one of the few helicopters that maintain their performance from sea level up to 9,000 feet.

==== American Eurocopter EC-120 ====
EC-120 Helicopters are short-to-medium-range, turbine-powered helicopters which will be used by OAM primarily as a light observation helicopter for tracking and general ground unit support.

OAM's EC-120 helicopter, which flies with a crew of 1 (Pilot), will provide a highly effective aerial surveillance platform in the border desert areas.

==== Bell UH-1H Huey II ====
AMO is remanufacturing UH-1H utility helicopters to a Huey II configuration. The UH-1H helicopters are short-range, turbine powered helicopters, which fly with a crew of two (pilot and copilot). The medium-lift capability of the UH-1H supports agents in high-altitude and hot environments.

The UH-1H helicopter is used by Air and Marine to perform tactical and utility missions along the border. The helicopter's secondary mission is to provide external lift capability in support of drug seizures and equipment delivery.

The remanufacturing dramatically increases mission capability, including increases in hover performance, gross weight, payload, and speed. The conversion also enables Air and Marine to manage its component supply system more efficiently.

==== Sikorsky UH-60 Black Hawk ====
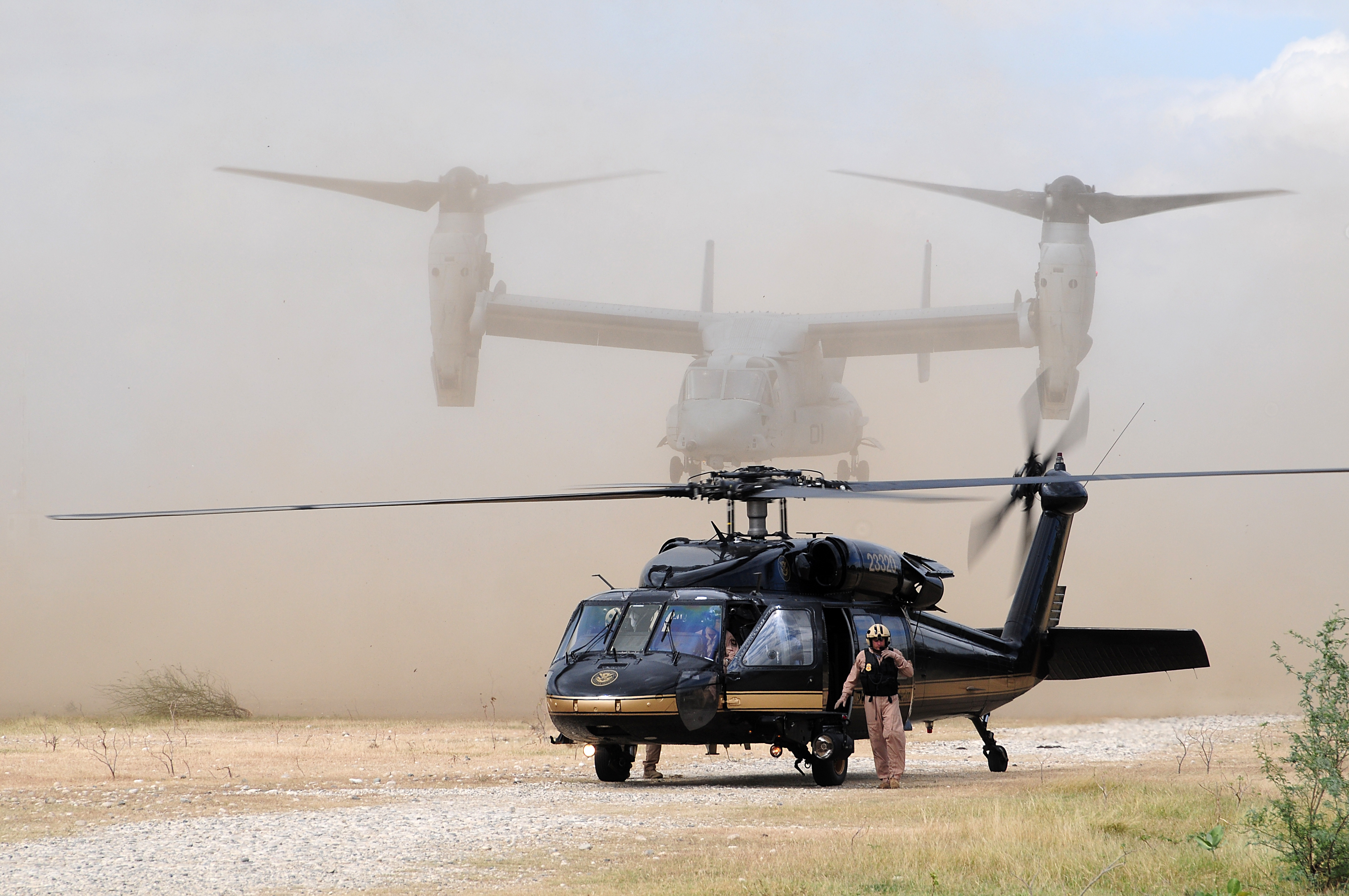
Sikorsky UH-60 Black Hawk

UH-60 Black Hawk helicopters are medium-range, all-weather, rotary-wing tactical apprehension aircraft used by the Office of Air and Marine to protect the American public from threats of terrorism and drug smuggling and to enforce airspace security over critical venues.

Classified as medium lift, they are powerful helicopters that can carry the necessary equipment and personnel for law enforcement operations, without sacrificing range or speed. They fly with a minimum crew of three (pilot, copilot, and crewmembers). In addition, they are well suited to the all-weather hazardous environments AMO may experience.

The newly acquired UH-60M model features a digital, glass cockpit, full autopilot capabilities and an upgraded navigation system. The Trakkabeam Search Light can be synched with the forward-looking infrared camera, allowing the two systems to operate more effectively when conducting aerial searches and can provide video to other agencies. Ballistic armor provides increased protection for pilots and crewmembers, and the engine upgrade provides more power and lift capability.

== Marine resources ==
AMO vessel crews work in conjunction with the Department of Defense, the Department of Justice, the Department of Homeland Security, and other law enforcement entities to accomplish the homeland security mission. These vessel crews are trained in maritime detection, pursuit, and high-risk boardings. They often work with a limited number of personnel during conditions conducive to smuggling to detect and interdict vessels carrying goods and people illegally crossing the United States border.

Marine Interdiction Agents are assisted by federal and state operated aircraft, and often utilize officers from other agencies who must be specially trained by AMO in maritime law enforcement tactics and safety. Air and Marine employs approximately 350 Marine Interdiction Agents throughout the nation who operate more than 300 vessels.

=== Open console ===
==== 41-foot SAFE Coastal Interceptor Vessel ====
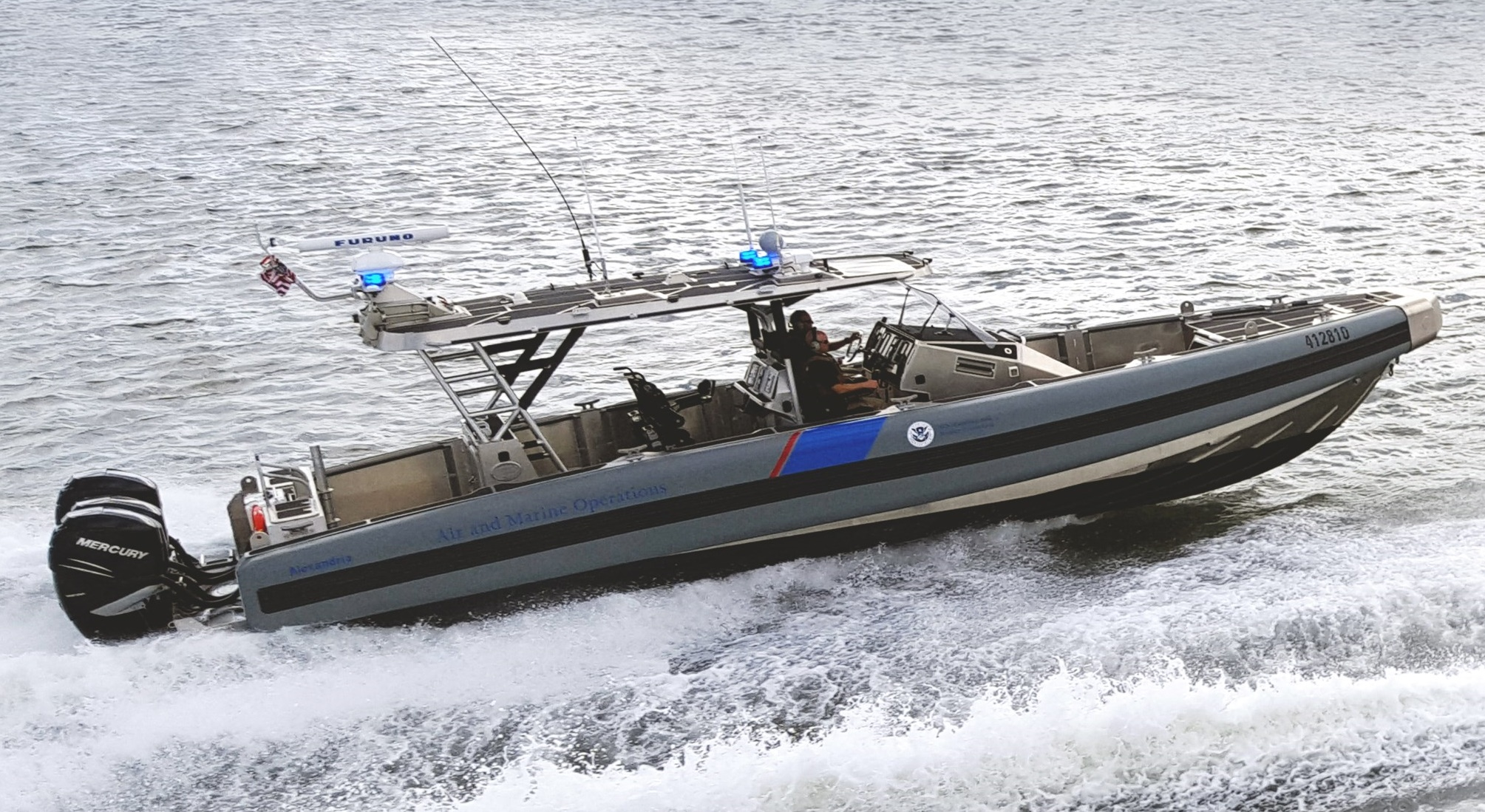
41-ft SAFE Boat

- Speed: 58 knots
- Range: 350 nautical miles
- Endurance: 10 hours
- Length: 41 feet
- Max Gross Weight: 20,000 pounds

The 41-foot SAFE Coastal Interceptor Vessel came into CBP service as a law enforcement interceptor in 2017. SAFE Boats have marine-grade aluminum hulls and polyethylene closed cell foam collars. Coastal interceptor vessels are manned by 3 agents, and feature improved speed, handling, and comfort compared to legacy platforms for crews on long-duration missions. These boats are designed to perform drug interdiction, stop human traffickers, and counter domestic terrorism on United States coastal waters and waterways.

=== Enclosed console ===
==== 38-foot SAFE Boat ====
- Speed: 50 knots
- Range: 400 nautical miles
- Endurance: 4 to 6 hours
- Length: 38 feet
- Weight: 18,000 pounds

The 38-foot Secure All-around Flotation Equipped (SAFE) Boat came into CBP service as a law enforcement interceptor in 2008. SAFE Boats have marine-grade aluminum hulls and polyethylene closed cell foam collars. This characteristic provides the stability and the buoyancy of a ridged hull inflatable, with a high factor of durability and safety. The protective cabin area of the SAFE Boat has heat and air to protect the crews from the elements.

==== 33-foot SAFE Boat ====
- Speed: 45 knots
- Range: 300 nautical miles
- Endurance: 4 to 6 hours
- Length: 33 feet
- Weight: 13,000 pounds

The USCG and CBP awarded an indefinite delivery/indefinite quantity (IDIQ) contract to SAFE Boats International of Port Orchard, Washington in 2006 to purchase 33-foot SAFE Boats. CBP purchased several of these boats for use as law enforcement interceptors. OAM uses the SAFE Boats for pursuing and boarding (inland and offshore) vessels transiting in rough waters and locations with extreme weather conditions.

== See also ==
- Department of Homeland Security
- U.S. Customs and Border Protection
  - Office of Field Operations
  - Office of Border Patrol
- Immigration and Customs Enforcement
  - Homeland Security Investigations
- Drug Enforcement Administration
- United States Coast Guard
  - Helicopter Interdiction Tactical Squadron
- Florida Fish and Wildlife Conservation Commission
- United States Secret Service
- Diplomatic Security Service
- United States Navy
- United States Air Force
