= M-1 visa =

Student visa for the United States for vocational and technical training

The M-1 visa is a type of student visa in the U.S. reserved for international students attending vocational schools and technical schools.

== Application process ==
In order to obtain an M-1 visa for traveling to the United States, a student must present a signed Form I-20 at a United States embassy or consulate in the student's home country. The I-20 is issued by a designated school official, typically the international student adviser, after the student has fulfilled a school's admissions requirements and presented proof of financial resources. Often, the person is a student at a community college or junior college providing vocational training or technical training and awards associate degrees; a vocational high school; a trade school; or a school of non-academic training other than language training. An applicant must have a fixed residence outside the U.S. that the applicant intends to maintain in order to be approved for an M-1 visa.

The application of a person seeking an M-1 visa to attend flight school must also include the specific reason for the flight training, the applicant's current employer and job position, the name and relationship of the person paying for the flight training, the applicant's most recent flight certifications and ratings, the aircraft's type and certified take-off weight to be trained on, and the applicant's current rank or title if presently actively employed as a pilot.

== Duration of status ==
A person with an M visa may enter the U.S. up to 30 days prior to the report date or start date of the course of study printed on the Form I-20. A person is admitted into the U.S. under M-1 status for a fixed time period, typically the period necessary to complete the course of study indicated on the Form I-20, plus time for Optional Practical Training after completion of studies, plus an additional 30 days to depart the U.S. The student's total stay in M-1 status in the U.S. may not exceed one year, unless approved for an extension for medical reasons. When the person enters the U.S., the person's I-94 Arrival-Departure Record Card is stamped with a date, unlike students with an F-1 visa.

A person in M-1 status is considered unlawfully present in the U.S. if the person's Form I-94 expires, the specified date of the person's admission has passed, or either an immigration judge or the Board of Immigration Appeals has ordered that an alien be excluded, deported, or removed. If a student violates their status, the student may be considered unlawfully present in the U.S. immediately, and the student would not be eligible for the thirty-day grace period to depart the U.S. A person who accrues between 180 and 365 days of unlawful presence in the U.S. may be prohibited from reentering the U.S. for three years after leaving the U.S. A person who accrues more than one year of unlawful presence in the U.S. from reentering the U.S. for ten years after leaving the U.S. A person with unlawful presence who leaves the U.S. before the age of 18 1/2, however, will not receive bans for unlawful presence.

A student's M-1 status may be extended if the student continues to be a nonimmigrant maintaining student status, the student has compelling educational reasons or medical reasons (but not academic probation or academic suspension) that caused the delay, and the student can and intends to maintain student status for the extended period. A student's M-1 status may not be extended longer than three years and 30 days from the student's original start date. A student cannot receive extensions if the student cannot complete the course of study within three years of the original program start date, including any decreases in course load.

== Spouse and children ==
The spouse and minor children of a student in M-1 status are typically eligible to enter the U.S. in M-2 status. At time of entry to the U.S., the spouse and minor children must each present an original SEVIS Form I-20 issued in the name of each family member.

== Work authorization ==
While studying, student in M-1 status is not allowed to work on-campus or off-campus.

=== Optional Practical Training ===
M-1 students are eligible for a relatively short amount of Optional Practical Training: one month for every four months of study. While an F-1 student can simply file an I-765 Application for Employment Authorization, an M-1 student must also file an I-539 to extend status. The applications are adjudicated at various United States Citizenship and Immigration Services service centers around the country, which sometimes have varying interpretations of the regulations. An application for Optional Practical Training should include the following.

- cover letter explaining the student's situation
- Form I-765
- $410 filing fee payable to Department of Homeland Security
- signed I-20 with Optional Practical Training request (copies are not accepted)
- copy of visa and passport photo page
- 2 passport photos
- copy of original I-20 and original financial documents
- current bank statement
- Form I-539
- $370 filing fee made out to Department of Homeland Security
- copy of both side of I-94 card

It is also advisable to include a copy of each application, since the I-765 and I-539 will be adjudicated separately at the service center. The result of an approved I-765 will be an Optional Practical Training card, also known as an Employment Authorization Document. The result of an approved I-539 will be a new I-94 departure card, which the student surrenders upon leaving the United States, to prove that he has left. A student may begin paid work upon receiving the OPT card (and applying for a social security number) even if the I-94 card has not arrived.

If the United States Citizenship and Immigration Services requires more information for either application, United States Citizenship and Immigration Services will send a request for evidence. Occasionally these requests are for items that were sent in originally; nevertheless, it is best to send them in again immediately. Approvals or denials will arrive separately and after different amounts of time.

== Course of study ==
Students in M-1 status must maintain a full course of study.

Students at a community college or junior college must take at least 12 credit hours as long as that is considered a full-time student by the educational institution. Post-secondary vocational students usually must take at least 18 hours per week of classroom instruction or, if predominantly a shop-based or laboratory-based curriculum, at least 22 hours per week of instruction. Students at a vocational high school or another nonacademic high school usually must attend classes for at least the minimum number of hours per week that the school considers normal progress towards graduation.

Online classes and distance-education classes that do not require physical attendance are not allowed to count toward the full course of study of a student in M-1 status.

If the student must take less than a full course of study because of an illness or medical condition, the designated school official must authorize the reduce course of study. The student's illness or medical condition must be documented by a licensed Doctor of Medicine, licensed Doctor of Osteopathic Medicine, or licensed clinical psychologist. A reduced course of study must not last for longer than five months during a course of study.

A student in M-1 status is not allowed to change the subject of study.

== Transfers ==
A student in M-1 status is allowed to transfer to another school only within the first six months of study in M-1 status. A transfer after more than six months of study in M-1 status may be allowed if the student is unable to remain at the original school because of reasons beyond the student's control.

== Change of status ==
Students in M-1 status may not change their status to F-1 status, and they may not change their status to any H status if the training received under M-1 status provided the qualifications for the temporary worker position sought.

== Annual limit ==
There is no maximum number of M-1 visas that may be issued each year.

== Statistics ==
M-1 visas issued by country
Country	Number Issued
Afghanistan	1
Albania	3
Algeria	93
Andorra	1
Angola	11
Antigua and Barbuda	7
Argentina	55
Australia	195
Austria	58
Azerbaijan	5
Bahamas, The	58
Bahrain	13
Bangladesh	3
Barbados	3
Belarus	3
Belgium	79
Belize	7
Bhutan	4
Bolivia	13
Bosnia and Herzegovina	1
Botswana	2
Brazil	229
Brunei	1
Bulgaria	6
Burma	21
Cabo Verde	4
Cambodia	10
Cameroon	9
Canada	25
Chile	30
Colombia	233
Congo, Democratic Republic of the	9
Congo, Republic of the	1
Costa Rica	19
Côte d'Ivoire	1
Croatia	3
Cyprus	2
Czech Republic	16
Denmark	31
Dominica	2
Dominican Republic	12
Ecuador	69
Egypt	49
El Salvador	4
Eritrea	3
Estonia	1
Ethiopia	3
Fiji	1
Finland	21
France	204
Georgia	3
Germany	416
Ghana	10
Great Britain and Northern Ireland	509
Greece	15
Grenada	3
Guatemala	24
Guyana	14
Haiti	5
Honduras	10
Hong Kong S.A.R.	33
Hungary	6
Iceland	11
India	489
Indonesia	104
Iraq	5
Ireland	39
Israel	46
Italy	127
Jamaica	27
Japan	539
Jordan	15
Kazakhstan	26
Kenya	25
Korea, South	607
Kosovo	2
Kuwait	13
Laos	1
Latvia	3
Lebanon	12
Liechtenstein	1
Lithuania	1
Luxembourg	4
Macau S.A.R.	2
Madagascar	2
Malawi	1
Malaysia	36
Maldives	2
Malta	3
Mauritius	1
Mexico	204
Moldova	1
Monaco	1
Mongolia	3
Morocco	6
Mozambique	1
Namibia	5
Nepal	1000
Netherlands	129
New Zealand	32
Nicaragua	1
Nigeria	107
North Macedonia	2
Norway	64
Oman	5
Pakistan	20
Palestine	2
Panama	65
Papua New Guinea	7
Paraguay	5
Peru	69
Philippines	55
Poland	27
Portugal	31
Qatar	6
Romania	24
Russia	47
Rwanda	5
Saint Lucia	2
Saint Vincent and the Grenadines	4
Samoa	1
Saudi Arabia	427
Senegal	1
Serbia	4
Seychelles	3
Sierra Leone	1
Singapore	46
Slovakia	3
Slovenia	4
South Africa	87
Spain	77
Sri Lanka	38
Sudan	6
Suriname	6
Swaziland	2
Sweden	82
Switzerland	130
Syria	3
Taiwan	317
Tanzania	19
Thailand	80
Trinidad and Tobago	29
Tunisia	3
Turkey	106
Turkmenistan	1
Uganda	12
Ukraine	25
United Arab Emirates	14
Uruguay	8
Uzbekistan	1
Venezuela	29
Vietnam	123
Yemen	6
Zambia	4
Zimbabwe	12
Worldwide Total	7,473

M visas issued by fiscal year (Note: Includes M-1, M-2, and M-3 visas)
Fiscal Year	Number Issued
2013	11,819
2014	12,210
2015	11,462
2016	10,694
2017	9,982
