= CBP Office of Field Operations =

U.S. Customs and Border Protection Office of Field Operations
- CBP right sleeve patch

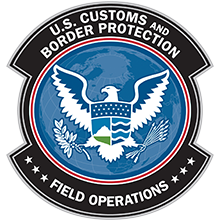
- Emblem of CBP Office of Field Operations and left sleeve patch

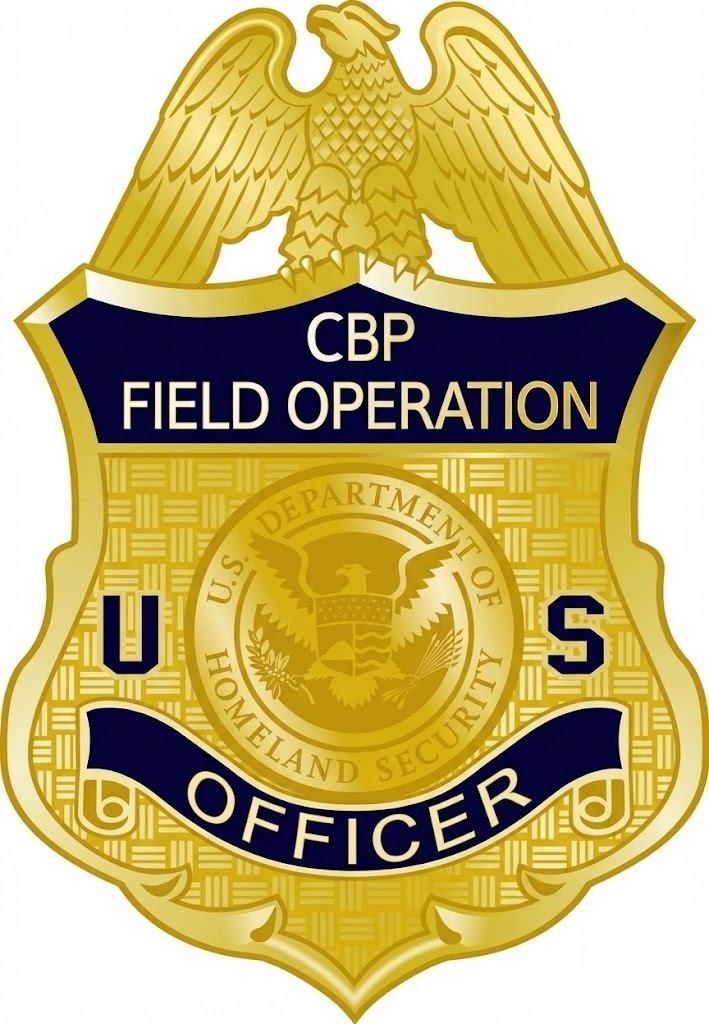
- CBP Officer badge

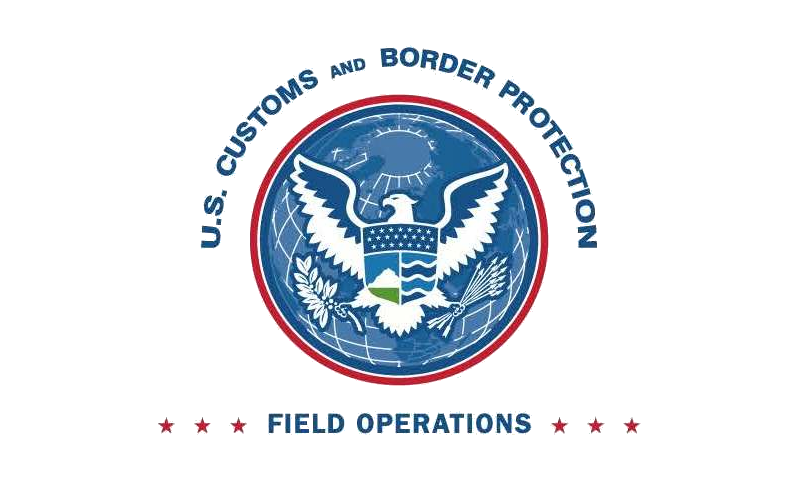
- CBP Office of Field Operations flag

Agency overview
- Formed: March 1, 2003
- Preceding agencies: Customs officers from the United States Customs Service; Immigration inspectors from United States Immigration and Naturalization Service; Agriculture inspectors from Animal and Plant Health Inspection Service

Jurisdictional structure
- Federal agency: United States
- Operations jurisdiction: United States
- Constituting instrument: Homeland Security Act of 2002
- General nature: Federal law enforcement

Operational structure
- Headquarters: Washington, D.C.
- Agency executive: Pete Flores, Executive Assistant Commissioner
- Parent agency: U.S. Customs and Border Protection

The Office of Field Operations (OFO) is a federal law enforcement agency within U.S. Customs and Border Protection (CBP) responsible for managing United States customs operations at twenty field operations offices, 328 ports of entry, and sixteen pre-clearance stations in Canada, Ireland, the UAE, and the Caribbean. Headed by an executive assistant commissioner, OFO directs the activities of roughly 33,000 employees.

== Overview ==
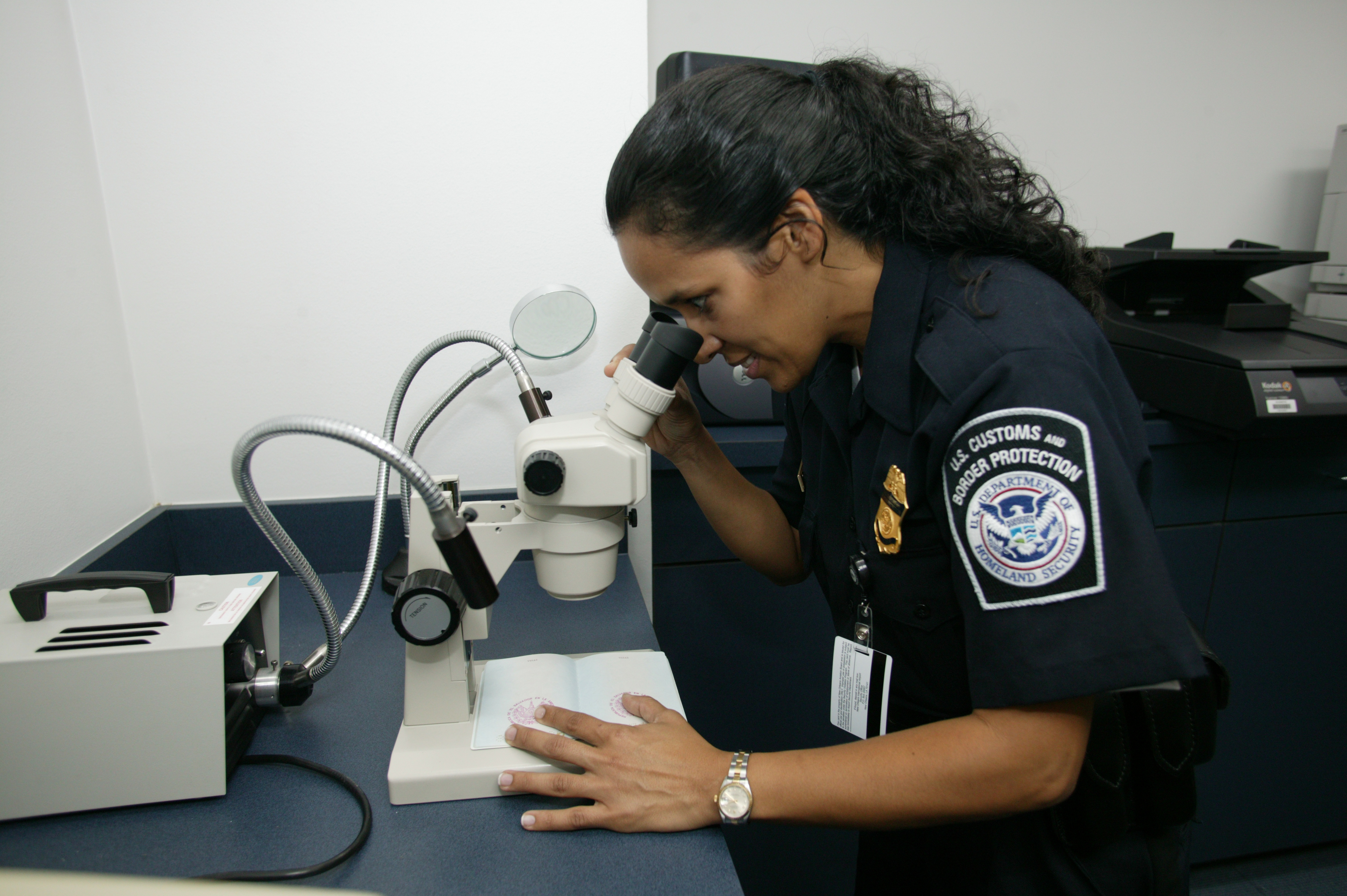
U.S. CBP Office of Field Operations agent checking the authenticity of a travel document at an international airport using a stereo microscope

CBP OFO has full border search authority granted by the U.S. Congress, which allows its officers to stop, question, inspect and examine any person or conveyance entering or exiting the United States and place those individuals violating federal law under arrest.

Ports of entry are responsible for daily port specific operations. Port personnel are the face at the border for most visitors and cargo entering the United States. Here, CBP enforces the import and export laws and regulations of the U.S. federal government and conducts immigration policy and programs. Ports also perform agriculture inspections to protect the US from potential carriers of animal and plant pests or diseases that could cause serious damage to America's crops, livestock, pets, and the environment.

The office, with an annual operating budget of approximately $3.2 billion, is responsible for immigration policy and programs related to the admission and exclusion of aliens. The office is also responsible for inspection of agricultural products at all ports of entry to protect the health of U.S. plant and animal resources and facilitate their movement in the global market place.

Additionally, the office is responsible for border security and facilitation, including interdiction, passenger operations, targeting and analysis, canine enforcement, and trade compliance and facilitation, which includes cargo entry and release, summary operations, trade risk management and enforcement, seizures and penalties, and expanding trade operations to focus on anti-terrorism.

CBP has the largest working law enforcement canine program in the world. Currently there are over 1,200 OFO canine teams fulfilling the CBP mission throughout the United States. The vast majority of CBP's resources are located along the Southwest border, from Brownsville, Texas to San Diego, California. Canine teams are also strategically assigned to other ports of entry around the country, and located at pre-clearance stations abroad.

As their core mission, CBP canine officers use specially trained detector dogs to interdict large quantities of illegal narcotic substances, concealed humans, smuggled agriculture products, and unreported currency at US ports of entry. The Canine Enforcement Program is also involved in specialized detection programs aimed at combating terrorist threats at the nation's borders and international airports.

The CBP.gov website states the following:

- In Fiscal Year 2009, outbound currency seizures amounted to more than $57.9 million and outbound weapons seizures totaled 433.
- FY09 was the Office of Field Operations’ most successful drug enforcement year in the past five fiscal years as measured by kilo weight seized. Specifically, FY09 seizures were up 53 percent for cocaine, 19 percent for marijuana and 11 percent for ephedrine. Outbound currency seizures went up 74 percent in a year-to-year comparison.
- During FY 09, CBP officers seized nearly 1.5 million more pounds of narcotics, and arrested 38,964 suspected criminals.
- CBP agriculture specialists seized more than 1.5 million pounds of prohibited meat, plant materials or animal products, including 166,727 agricultural pests at ports of entry.
- As part of CBP's efforts to secure the United States' ports of entry, CBP's Container Security Initiative (CSI), remains operational in 58 seaports, in 32 countries worldwide. 86 percent of the maritime containerized cargo destined for the U.S. originates or passes through a CSI port, affording the U.S. government the opportunity to identify and examine the highest risk containers. In FY09, over 56,000 examinations were performed overseas as part of the CSI program.
- CBP enhanced the Customs-Trade Partnership Against Terrorism (C-TPAT) program by adding Mexican Long Haul Carriers, and Foreign Port Terminal Operators. In June, a Mutual Recognition Arrangement was signed with Japan, increasing the number of mutual recognition arrangements to four (CBP also has mutual recognition arrangements with Canada, Jordan, and New Zealand). In FY09, C-TPAT's 187 Supply Chain Security Specialists (SCSS) completed more than 2,500 validations in 90 foreign countries.
- CBP installed Radio Frequency Identification (RFID) technology at 39 major entry points along the U.S borders with Canada and Mexico. The RFID technology, which was successfully installed at 354 vehicle lanes, will help speed travel and further enhance border security. Use of RFID enables swifter processing at border crossings for travelers using new state-of-the-art travel documents. These documents are the result of the Western Hemisphere Travel Initiative.
- CBP also launched a national television, print and online advertising campaign to educate the public about new travel document requirements on June 1 under the Western Hemisphere Travel Initiative. The Western Hemisphere Travel Initiative (WHTI) secure document requirements were successfully implemented at all nation's land and seaports on June 1. WHTI implements a key 9/11 Commission Recommendation and statutory mandate. U.S. and Canadian citizens, ages 16 and older, must present a secure travel document that denotes identity and citizenship when entering the U.S. CBP's initial assessment of the implementation of WHTI, indicates no discernable negative impact to border operations. Travel document compliance rates continue to remain high for U.S. and Canadian citizens. There is a 95 percent national compliance rate: 98 percent in the northern border and 93 percent in the southern border. Travelers are presenting the requested documents when crossing the border.
- Global Entry is a customer service and security program designed to expedite the screening and processing of pre-approved, low-risk U.S. citizens and lawful permanent residents traveling from abroad to the U.S. The pilot program started at George Bush Intercontinental, John F. Kennedy International and Washington Dulles International airports and expanded to 13 additional airports: Boston, Dallas, Detroit, Fort Lauderdale, Fla., Honolulu, Las Vegas, Newark, N.J., Orlando, Fla., Sanford, Fla., Philadelphia, San Juan, Puerto Rico, San Francisco and Seattle. More than 22,000 members enrolled.
- CBP deployed 179 new radiation portal monitors (RPM) throughout the nation's ports of entry, bringing the number of RPMs to 1,354 at the nation's land and sea ports of entry. These deployed RPMs allow CBP the capability to scan 100 percent of all mail and express consignment mail and parcels; 99 percent of all truck cargo and 98 percent of the personally owned vehicles entering from Canada; 100 percent of all truck cargo and 100 percent of the personally owned vehicles arriving from Mexico; and approximately 98 percent of all arriving sea-borne containerized cargo for illicit radiological or nuclear materials.
- Working with airports, airlines and the travel industry, CBP expanded the Model Ports Initiative to 18 additional airports. This joint venture between federal agencies, the travel industry, airlines and airport authorities was designed to improve processes for clearing and welcoming travelers into the U.S. The 18 airports were selected based on the locations with the largest number of foreign visitors arriving annually. Selected international airports include: New York (JFK), Miami, Los Angeles (LAX), Newark, Chicago (O’Hare), Honolulu, San Francisco, Atlanta, Dallas/Ft. Worth, Orlando, Detroit, Boston, Las Vegas, Sanford (Fla.), Seattle, Philadelphia, San Juan and Ft. Lauderdale.

== See also ==
- CBP Air and Marine Operations
- United States Border Patrol
- Border control
- Canada–United States border
- Federal law enforcement in the United States
- Mexico – United States barrier
