= Optional Practical Training =

Authorized Foreign Student Training Period in United States

In the United States, Optional Practical Training (OPT) is a period during which undergraduate and graduate students with F-1 status who have completed or have been pursuing their degrees for one academic year are permitted by the United States Citizenship and Immigration Services (USCIS) to work for one year on a student visa towards getting practical training to complement their education. Foreign students currently enrolled at a U.S. university can receive full-time or part-time work authorization through Curricular Practical Training. In 2022, there were 171,635 OPT employment authorizations. In 2021, there were 115,651 new non-STEM OPT authorizations, a 105% increase from a decade prior.

During the 2021-2022 school year, the two nations with the highest number of OPT students were India and China. There were 68,188 Indian OPT students and 51,199 Chinese OPT students. According to Pew Research, there were 441,400 OPT approvals from India and 313,500 from China between 2004-2016. The University of Southern California was the largest OPT participant between 2003 and 2017, with 30,720 approvals.

On April 2, 2008, the U.S. Department of Homeland Security (DHS) Secretary Michael Chertoff announced a 17-month extension to the OPT for students in qualifying STEM fields. To be eligible for the 12-month permit, any degree in any field of studies is valid. For the 17-month OPT extension, a student must have received a science, technology, engineering, or mathematics degree as defined by USCIS.

On March 11, 2016, the Department of Homeland Security published a final rule allowing certain F-1 students who receive STEM degrees and who meet other specified requirements to apply for a 24-month extension of their post-completion OPT, giving STEM graduates a total of 36 months of OPT. The 24-month extension replaces the 17-month STEM OPT extension previously available to STEM students (see 73 FR 18944). Eligible students could apply for a 24-month STEM OPT extension starting on May 10, 2016. In 2019, there were 72,116 new STEM OPT authorizations. Compared to a decade prior, it is an 1108% increase. In the same year, there were 78,000 STEM OPT workers from India and 30,000 workers from China.

There also exists a post-completion Practical Training option for students on M-1 visas, but it is significantly more restrictive than that for F-1 students. Unless otherwise specified, Optional Practical Training is understood to refer to Optional Practical Training for F-1 students.

== Program Structure ==
=== OPT Requirements ===
Any F-1 visa international student who graduates from a U.S college or university qualifies for OPT. Additionally they must work either part-time (20 hours a week or more) or full time. A student who has completed more than a year of full-time Curricular Practical Training is not eligible for Optional Practical Training.

For the STEM OPT extension, there are additional requirements:

- The student must have studies in a STEM field. The Department of Homeland Security bases its definition of "STEM field" on the Department of Education's National Center for Education Statistics (NCES). DHS frequently updates a list of study programs that count as STEM. There are currently 540 STEM field majors. The last update was on January 21, 2022.
- Employer that is enrolled in or uses E-Verify.

=== OPT Application ===
In order to apply for Optional Practical Training, a foreign student must reach out to the designated school official (DSO) at the college or university to endorse Form I‑20, Certification of Eligibility for Nonimmigrant Student Status. Afterwards, the student must fill out a Form I-765, Application for Employment Authorization. The filing fee for the form is $410. OPT application approval takes three to five months to receive an approval and start date.

=== Job Requirements ===
OPT employment must be in the participant's field of study. OPT jobs can be both unpaid and paid, and entrepreneurship related to one's field is also allowable. For STEM OPT, an employer, along with the worker, must fill out Form I-983.

International startup founders often seek to use the OPT period for achieving funding and growth milestones which qualify them for "extraordinary ability" visas, such as the O visa.

== OPT Statistics ==
One place to look for statistics on yearly OPT authorizations is Immigration and Customs Enforcement. In 2021, there were 115,651 new OPT authorizations, a 105% increase from a decade ago.

OPT Employment of Foreign Graduates between 2007-2022
Year	Number of Foreign Students on OPT
2007	24,838
2008	45,357
2009	46,198
2010	51,080
2011	56,421
2012	62,628
2013	67,740
2014	77,619
2015	99,323
2016	137,570
2017	152,681
2018	145,564
2019	138,898
2020	122,699
2021	115,651
2022	117,301

In 2019, there were 72,116 new STEM OPT authorizations. Compared to a decade prior, it is an 1108% increase.

STEM OPT Authorizations of Foreign Graduates between 2007-2022
Year	Number of Foreign Students on STEM OPT
2007	2
2008	2,128
2009	5,869
2010	9,356
2011	13,504
2012	15,937
2013	18,782
2014	21,456
2015	27,493
2016	41,782
2017	64,481
2018	69,650
2019	72,116
2020	63,906
2021	61,543
2022	64,844

2019 Top 10 Employers of OPT and STEM OPT Graduates
Company	Number of Foreign Students on OPT or STEM OPT
Amazon	2,813
Google	1,123
AZTech Technologies LLC	1,057
Deloitte	822
Microsoft	817
Intel Corporation	790
Integra Technologies LLC	721
Facebook	708
Apple, Inc	463
Walmart	441

=== OPT Approvals & Denials from 2008-2013 ===
The Government Accountability Office published a report in 2014 with information on OPT approvals and denials from fiscal year 2008-2013. Note that the counts here are of receipts, approvals, denials or revocations that happened in the fiscal year, regardless of when other activities surrounding that application occurred. For instance, if an application was approved in Fiscal Year 2009 and revoked in Fiscal Year 2010, the revocation would be counted in 2010 rather than 2009. Thus, the number of receipts for a given year need not equal the sum of the number of approvals and denials for that year. The approval rate for OPT petitions between 2008 and 2013 was 96%.

Fiscal Year	Receipts	Approvals	Denials	Revocations
2008	38,730	28,497	360	1
2009	87,636	90,896	2,125	71
2010	99,876	96,916	1,731	57
2011	109,895	105,357	2,226	67
2012	117,141	115,303	2,801	71
2013	128,591	123,328	3,400	77
Total	581,869	560,297	12,643	344

=== Number of OPT Students by Country ===
Another place to find statistics on optional practical training is from the Institute of International Education. The organization maintains data on the number of international students as part of its Open Doors project, supported from a grant by the Bureau of Educational and Cultural Affairs in the U.S. Department of State. The data is collected through surveys of over 3,000 accredited U.S. higher education institutions, and does not rely on any privileged access to government data. Institutions not included in the survey (such as high schools that issue student visas, and non-accredited institutions that are SEVP-certified) may be omitted from the statistics. Since the 2006–2007 academic year, these surveys have included data on usage of the Optional Practical Training program.

Since the Optional Practical Training program duration is a year for most people (though the STEM extension and cap gap allow for longer OPTs under some circumstances), the number of approvals in a given year should roughly match the number of students on Optional Practical Training. However, because of various mismatches such as that between the fiscal and academic year, and between the date of approval and the start date, and the fact that the Open Doors survey does not cover all SEVP-certified institutions, the numbers may not exactly match those from the GAO table.

The data below summarizes both total OPT usage and the usage based on country of origin for the top countries of origin. More detailed data is available at the IIE website.

Year	Total use of OPT	Mainland China	India	South Korea	ROC	Canada	Japan
2006-07	48,387	7,171	10,703	4,497	2,993	1,653	2,350
2007-08	56,766	7,718	10,846	4,965	3,178	1,869	2,459
2008-09	66,601	8,212	14,886	5,134	3,444	1,778	2,237
2009-10	67,804	11,003	19,657	5,862	3,569	1,969	2,068
2010-11	76,031	13,268	24,665	6,026	3,737	2,204	1,820
2011-12	85,157	18,394	26,742	5,807	3,377	2,140	1,593
2012-13	94,919	23,968	27,831	6,268	3,417	2,333	1,630
2013-14	105,997	33,401	27,696	6,639	3,540	2,568	1,458
2014-15	120,287	43,114	29,388	6,635	3,622	2,683	1,285
2015-16	147,498	52,193	42,328	7,039	4,017	2,897	1,416
2016-17	175,695	59,835	57,132	7,784	4,223	3,139	1,447
2017-18	203,462	65,680	75,390	7,714	4,496	3,225	1,501
2018-2019	223,085						
2019-2020	223,539						
2020-2021	203,885						
2021-2022	184,759						

=== OPT Demographic Statistics ===
==== Global Geographic Statistics ====
- Between 2004 and 2016, there were 441,400 OPT approvals from India and 313,500 from China. India and China received 30% and 21% of all OPT approvals.
- 74% of approved OPT graduates were from the Asia-Pacific region between 2004 and 2016. Europe and Latin America/Caribbean tied with 8% each.

==== U.S. Geographic Statistics ====
- The New York metropolitan area had the most OPT approvals during the same time frame, with 218,400 OPT approvals, followed by Los Angeles and Boston.
- California has the highest percentage of OPT workers, with 20.8%.

==== Education Statistics ====
- The University of Southern California was the biggest OPT participant between 2003 and 2017, with 30,720 approvals.
- 70% of OPT participants in the U.S. graduated with a master's degree.
- The most common field of study for OPT majors is computer science and business administration and management, both at 8.6%.

== History ==
=== 1947: Student practical training ===
Since before Congress enacted the Immigration and Nationality Act of 1952 (INA), the executive branch under every president from Harry S. Truman onward has interpreted enduring provisions of the immigration laws to permit foreign visitors on student visas to complement their classroom studies with a limited period of postcoursework Optional Practical Training (OPT). A 1947 rule allowed foreign students "admitted temporarily to the United States … for the purpose of pursuing a definite course of study" to remain here for up to eighteen months following completion of coursework for "employment for practical training" as required or recommended by their school "for a six-month period subject to extension for not over two additional six-month periods".

=== 1992: Creation of OPT ===
The first Bush administration created Optional Practical Training with an interim rule on July 20, 1992. The Immigration and Naturalization Service created the program without prior public comment or notice. The 1990 Immigration Act originally created a time-limited employment pilot program for foreign students on visas.

=== 2008: Introduction of the STEM OPT Extension ===
The STEM extension was announced in an interim rule by Department of Homeland Security Secretary Michael Chertoff on April 2, 2008, published in the Federal Register issue of Tuesday, April 8, 2008. The STEM extension appears to be directly attributable to Congressional testimony by Microsoft co-founder Bill Gates, March 12, 2008. This policy changes shaped foreign students' decision to decide and obtain a STEM degree. In addition, foreign students were 18% more likely to have a STEM field degree following the 2008 policy change. In addition, the likelihood that a foreign student completes a STEM master's degree rose 33%.

=== 2008: Challenge from Immigration Reform Law Institute (IRLI) ===
The OPT STEM extension announced in April 2008 was challenged in a lawsuit by the Immigration Reform Law Institute filed on May 29, 2008. The organization filed a lawsuit in federal court on behalf of various organizations and individuals challenging the validity of the 17-month OPT extension. On August 5, 2008, the lawsuit was rejected by a New Jersey district court judge.

=== 2014: Obama Administration Changes ===
A November 20, 2014 memo by Department of Homeland Security Secretary Jeh Charles Johnson outlining proposed executive action on immigration endorsed by President Barack Obama included some suggested changes to the OPT program. The proposals were discussed and critiqued in National Law Review.

=== 2014: Challenge in November ===
In August 2015, a US federal court gave the green light to a lawsuit challenging the 17-month OPT STEM extension, filed by the Washington Alliance of Technology Workers and three IT workers who claimed that the OPT STEM extension had created unfair low-wage competition that had materially hurt them.

On August 12, 2015, the United States District Court for the District of Columbia vacated the 2008 OPT Regulations but stayed the order until February 12, 2016, later extended to May 10, 2016, to allow DHS to provide a transition. The court therefore gave the federal government a deadline and an extension to formulate new rules. The D.C. District explicitly rejected the reasoning of the New Jersey District and Third Circuit in dismissing the earlier 2008 challenge.

=== 2016: New STEM OPT Extension Rule ===
The proposed rules suggested in the November 20, 2014 memo by DHS Secretary Jeh Johnson were finalized by DHS on March 9, 2016, to be effective May 10, 2016, just in time to address the November 2014 court challenge to the original STEM extension. USCIS expanded the STEM extension to two years. The agency did add a requirement that the employer attest to the non-displacement of U.S. workers, to address concerns raised in the STEM extension lawsuit challenge.

=== 2020: Trump Administration OPT Limitation Proposal ===
In April and May 2020, in response to the COVID-19 pandemic and the increase in unemployment due to the pandemic and associated government lockdowns, the administration of President Donald Trump was reported to be exploring new restrictions on OPT. However, the Trump administration ultimately left out OPT from his executive actions due to White House Deputy Chief of Staff for Policy Coordination Chris Liddell rallying universities against any restrictions on the program.

=== 2025: Second Trump Administration and Site Visits ===
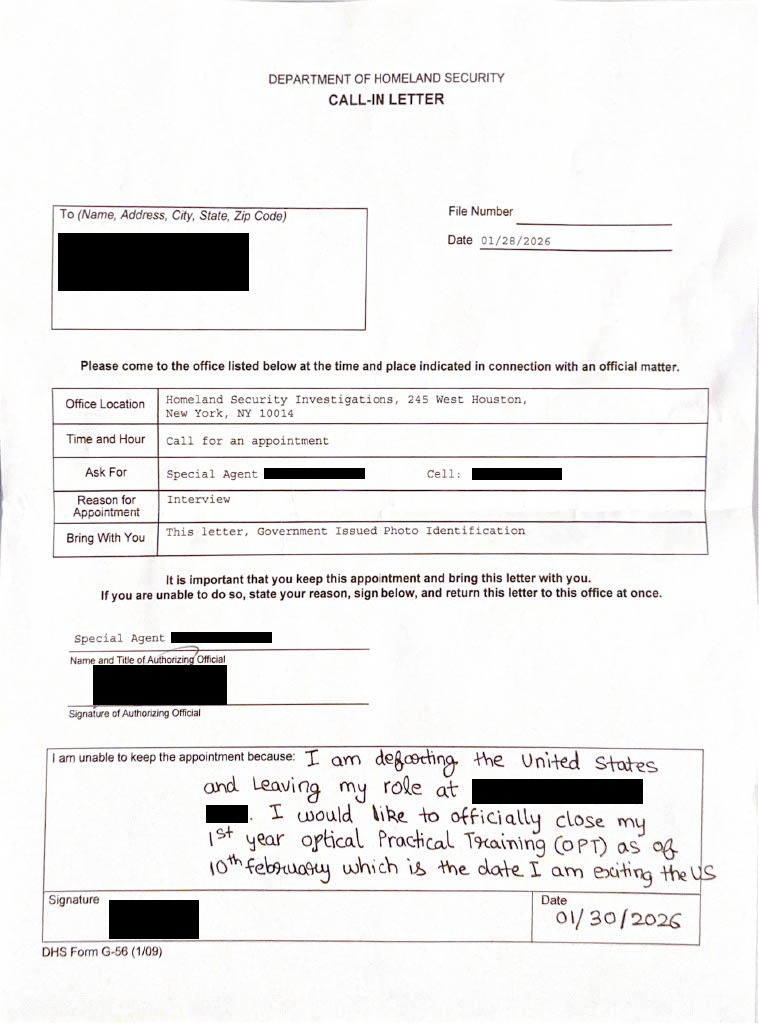
Site visit letter left at the home of an OPT graduate working remotely yet absent at the time of the visit in early 2026; this graduate was on the first year of OPT, beyond the scope of the site visit program.

Although DHS has possessed the authority to conduct site visits at the locations of employers training F-1 students on STEM OPT extensions (years 2 and 3 of OPT) since 2016, enforcement was initially limited. Upon the start of the second Trump administration in 2025, however, the frequency and scope of these site visits experienced a sharp ramp-up, including surprise home visits for graduates working remotely.

== Criticism ==
=== Cheap Labor ===
Labor experts have noted that employers like to hire foreign workers on OPT because employers get a discount. Students working with OPT authorization do not pay Social Security and Medicare taxes. For employers, hiring an OPT worker amounts to a 15.3% discount per student compared to an American citizen or permanent resident.

Employers receive another discount because these companies do not have to provide health insurance as OPT workers are required to maintain private health insurance.

Georgetown University researchers found OPT workers are paid 41.7 percent less than equivalent U.S. workers They found that in general, the student-to-temporary work visa pathway reduced earnings until these foreign students became legal permanent residents.

=== Displacing American College Graduates ===
Critics of the Optional Practical Training program allege that the program allows for U.S companies to prefer international students who studied in United States over American college graduates.

In 2019, The Department of Labor sued Oracle Corporation favored foreign Asian graduates of U.S. colleges over American graduates.

Howard University Professor of Public Policy Ron Hira commented on the government lawsuit "Oracle is not alone in favoring foreign workers who can be paid less because they're tied to a company by their visa or work permit. Industry's key argument for cheaper H-1B and OPT guest workers is that there's a shortage of U.S. talent. That argument completely falls apart in the face of these findings. In fact, the industry is using the visa programs for cheaper guest workers, undercutting U.S. workers, damaging the U.S. talent pipeline, and exacerbating its woeful record on workforce diversity."

=== Lack of Congressional Authorization ===
Policy scholars and detractors of OPT have noted that Congress never provided F-1 visa foreign students the ability to work besides a three-year pilot program included in the Immigration Act of 1990 that ended.

=== Internal Brain Drain ===
Journalists have pointed out that foreign STEM OPT recipients drive American STEM graduates and future STEM students away from industry through wage deflation and competition for entry-level jobs.

=== Lack of Government Oversight ===
Some have criticized the OPT program because of a lack of government oversight. By design, only school officials review student practical training plans.

=== Visa Mills ===
Some have critiqued the OPT program for incentivizing academic institutions to focus on international over American students. The incentive for many foreign students is to obtain work authorization in the United States, which universities take advantage of. Examples of visa mill colleges that used OPT to attract foreign students include Silicon Valley University, the University of Northern Virginia, ITU, Herguan University, and Tri-Valley.

=== National Security Risk & Theft ===
Lawmakers have expressed concerns that vulnerabilities in the work authorization program expose the United States to foreign theft of intellectual property, especially from China.

=== Fraud ===
There are concerns about fraud with the program. An investigation by NBC News found that fake companies were exploiting the foreign student guestworker program. These companies created fraudulent employment documents so foreign graduates could stay in the United States illegally. Companies such as Tellon Trading and Findream, employing 1,200 OPT graduates total in 2017, were the only companies on paper.

=== Another Employer Guest Worker Program ===
Labor experts have noted how the optional practical training is primarily a guestworker program for employers, not an educational one. These researchers say that OPT should be understood and categorized along with other guest worker programs such as the H-1B visa program.

== Support of the OPT program ==
=== Economic Growth and Job Creation ===
Proponents of the Optional Practical Training program highlight its strong positive effect on the U.S. economy and job market. Research shows that foreign-born workers, including those on OPT, create jobs for native-born workers overall instead of displacing them. A 2018 forecasting model from the Business Roundtable found that cutting the OPT program by 60% would lead to a 0.25% decline in the U.S. Gross Domestic Product by 2028 and a total loss of 443,000 jobs, with 255,000 of those jobs held by native-born U.S. workers. Furthermore, the NAFSA association of international educators reports that international students and their families contributed nearly $42.9 billion to the U.S. economy and supported over 355,000 jobs during the 2024–2025 academic year.

=== Fostering Innovation and Patent Creation ===
Economists and policy scholars argue that the OPT program drives American innovation, especially in Science, Technology, Engineering, and Mathematics (STEM) fields. A 2019 report by the Niskanen Center found that more OPT participants in a region leads to increased innovation, measured by the number of patents issued. Specifically, every 10 additional OPT participants in a metropolitan area is associated with five more patents. Immigrant graduates with science and engineering degrees have historically patented at twice the rate of the average American, and the share of U.S. patents held by immigrants rose from 9% in 1975 to 28% in 2015. A 10% increase in international graduate students is linked with a 4.5% rise in patent applications. Additionally, many foreign graduates become entrepreneurs; 22% of billion-dollar startups in the United States had at least one immigrant founder who first came to the country as an international student. Notable examples include Zoom, Tesla, SpaceX, and Instagram.

=== No Displacement of U.S. Workers ===
Despite claims that OPT participants take jobs from Americans, several studies have found no proof of job displacement. A March 2019 policy brief from the National Foundation for American Policy (NFAP) analyzed nine years of data (2008–2016) on foreign students with STEM majors approved for OPT and concluded that these students do not reduce job opportunities for U.S. workers. In fact, the study showed that a higher number of foreign students approved for OPT, compared to U.S. workers, is linked to a lower unemployment rate among U.S. STEM workers. Employers are more likely to hire foreign student workers when U.S. workers are scarce, helping to fill important skills gaps instead of pushing out domestic labor.

=== Global Competitiveness and Talent Retention ===
Supporters of the OPT program stress its importance for keeping the United States competitive in the global fight for talent. Experiential learning opportunities attract international students; a survey by World Education Services found that 73% of international students and alumni said gaining U.S. work experience was a key reason for coming to study in the United States. Without the OPT program, the U.S. risks losing top international students to other countries with better post-graduation work policies, like Canada and Australia. The Information Technology and Innovation Foundation has argued that keeping international graduates through programs like OPT is crucial to meet the high demand for STEM talent in key sectors. They note that temporary visa holders obtained 58% of all computer and information sciences doctorates and 51% of all engineering doctorates in 2024.

=== Bipartisan and Industry Support ===
The OPT program has strong support from both the technology industry and lawmakers from both parties. Major tech companies, including Amazon, Google, and Microsoft, are among the top employers of OPT participants and depend on the program to find skilled international graduates. Industry leaders, including former Microsoft CEO Bill Gates, have testified before Congress in favor of expanding OPT to encourage innovation. In March 2026, a bipartisan group of lawmakers introduced the Keep Innovators in America Act. This bill aims to establish the OPT program in law to provide long-term certainty for students, universities, and employers, recognizing the program's economic significance.

=== Pathway to High-Skilled Immigration ===
Economists point out that OPT is a vital pathway for the high-skilled workforce in the United States. It serves as a primary step toward the H-1B visa; about 34% of first-time H-1B visa recipients transition from student visas via the OPT route. Research shows that foreign graduates not only start their own businesses but also enable native-born Americans to create their own; over a third of additional startups linked to foreign graduates are founded by native-born Americans. When the OPT program was expanded in the past, patenting in U.S. metropolitan areas significantly affected by the expansion increased compared to those with little impact, suggesting that ending OPT would harm American innovation in the long run.
