= Tala =

Tala may refer to:

== Arts and entertainment ==
- Tala (comics), a fictional character in DC comics
- Tala, a 1938 volume of poetry by Gabriela Mistral
- Tala (music), a rhythmic pattern in Indian classical music
- "Tala" (song), by Sarah Geronimo, 2016
- Tālā (musician) (Jasmin Tadjiky, born 1989), London-based musician

== Places ==
=== Africa ===
- Tala, Egypt
- Tala, Kenya
- Thala, Tunisia

=== Americas ===
- Tala, Jalisco, Mexico
- Tala, Uruguay

=== Asia ===
- Tala or Getahovit, Tavush Province, Armenia
- Tala, Azerbaijan (disambiguation)
- Tala Upazila, Khulna Division, Bangladesh
  - Tala Union, within Tala Upazila
- Tala, Bhutan
- Tala, Cyprus
- Tala, Iran
- Tala, Kolkata, India
- Tala, Raigad, India
- Tala taluka, Raigad, India
- Tala, Russia
- Tala River, in Seram Island, Indonesia

== Other uses ==
- Tala (name), a female given name, and a list of people and fictional characters with the name
- Tala (goddess), in Tagalog mythology
- Samoan tālā, the currency of Samoa
- Celtis tala, or tala, a deciduous tree in South America
- Təla (Tala), the seventh month of the Afghan calendar
- Tala language, a Chadic language of Nigeria
- Tala (Hindu architecture), a main horizontal element of Hindu temples
- Tala (rocket), a hybrid propellant rocket developed in the Philippines

== See also ==
- Tal (disambiguation)
- Talas (disambiguation)
- Thala (disambiguation)
- Talla (disambiguation)
- Talash (disambiguation)
- Aşağı Tala, Azerbaijan
- Yuxarı Tala, Azerbaijan
