= TAL =

TAL or Tal may refer to:

== Acronym ==
- Ralph M. Calhoun Memorial Airport (IATA code: TAL), in Tanana, Alaska
- TAL – Transportes Aéreos Ltda, the original name of TAC – Transportes Aéreos Catarinense, a Brazilian airline
- TAL effector, a family of DNA binding proteins with high sequence specificity
- Terai Arc Landscape, a trans-border protected ecosystem of Nepal and India
- The Alberta Library, a not-for-profit library consortium
- This American Life, a radio and television program
- Tokyo Ai-Land Shuttle, a helicopter passenger service in the Izu Islands, Japan
- Tower Australia Life, an insurance company in Australia owned by Dai-ichi Life
- Transalpine Pipeline, a crude oil pipeline
- Transitional Administrative Law of Iraq
- Transoceanic Abort Landing for the Space Shuttle
- Triacetic acid lactone, an organic compound
- Tyrosine ammonia lyase, an enzyme
- Technology Alert List, a list created by the United States government of sensitive subjects when reviewing visa applications
- Torpedo Advanced Light, also called Shyena, an Indian torpedo

=== Programming languages ===
- Template Attribute Language
- Transaction Application Language, Tandem's system programming language
- Typed assembly language

== Places ==
- Tal, Hormozgan, Iran, a village
- Tal, Madhya Pradesh, India, a town
- Tal, Minsk Region, an agrotown in Minsk Region, Belarus
- Tal (Munich), a street in Munich, Germany
- Tal or Tall, Semnan, Iran, a village

== Entertainment ==
- Tal: His Marvelous Adventures with Noom-Zor-Noom, a 1929 fantasy adventure novel by Paul Fenimore Cooper
- A main character from Garth Nix's The Seventh Tower series
- Tal (album), a 1956 album by American jazz guitarist Tal Farlow

== People ==
- Tal (name), a list of people with either the given name or surname
- Tal (singer), Israeli-French pop singer Tal Benizri (born 1989)

== Business ==
- Tal (ISP), a former Icelandic ISP (now a part of 365 (media corporation))
- TAL Education Group, a Chinese holding company that offers after-school education.

== Other uses ==
- Tal language, spoken in Nigeria
- Tal palm, or Borassus flabellifer, a South Asian fan palm
- Tal, a traditional Korean mask
- Tal (Rauch), a 1999 painting by Neo Rauch

== See also ==
- Tala (disambiguation)
- Tala (music), also spelled Taal, a term for rhythmic patterns from Indian classical music
