= Talla =

Talla may refer to:

== People ==
- Didier Talla (born 1989), Cameroonian football player
- Talla Diaw (born 1954), Senegalese wrestler
- Talla Gnananandam, Indian pastor
- Talla N'Diaye (born 1993), Senegalese football player
- Talla Sylla (born 1966), Senegalese politician

== Fictional characters ==
- Talla Tarly, a character in the Game of Thrones media franchise
- Duane Talla, a preloaded character in The Sims 4: Island Living

== Places ==
=== Egypt ===
- Talla, one of the transliterations of Tala, Egypt

=== Italy ===
- Talla, Arezzo, Tuscany, Italy

=== Scotland ===
- Talla, also known as Inchtalla, island in the Loch or Lake of Menteith, central Scotland
- Talla Castle, Scotland
- Talla Railway, Scotland
- Talla Reservoir, Scotland
- Talla Water, river in Scotland

=== United States ===
- Tallabogue (disambiguation), several streams in Mississippi, United States

== See also ==
- Tala (disambiguation)
- Tella, Ethiopian alcoholic beverage
