= Talas =

Talas (Chinese: 塔拉斯) may refer to:

== Related to the place ==
- Talas Region, Kyrgyzstan
  - Talas, Kyrgyzstan
  - Talas Alatau, a mountain range
- Talas (river), in Kyrgyzstan and Kazakhstan
- Talas, also known as Taraz (Chinese: 塔拉茲), Kazakhstan
- Talas, Kayseri, Turkey

== Other uses ==
- Battle of Talas, 751 AD
- Talas (name), list of people with the name
- Talas alphabet, a Turkic script
- Talas, an American rock band featuring Billy Sheehan
- VIA Talas, a former Yugoslav New Wave band
- Tropical Storm Talas, the name of several storms
- Talas, a character in the TV series Star Trek: Enterprise
- Talas, deity of Albanian mythology

== See also ==
- Tala (disambiguation)
- Talash (disambiguation)
