= Vimana (architectural feature) =

Tower above the sanctum in Hindu temples

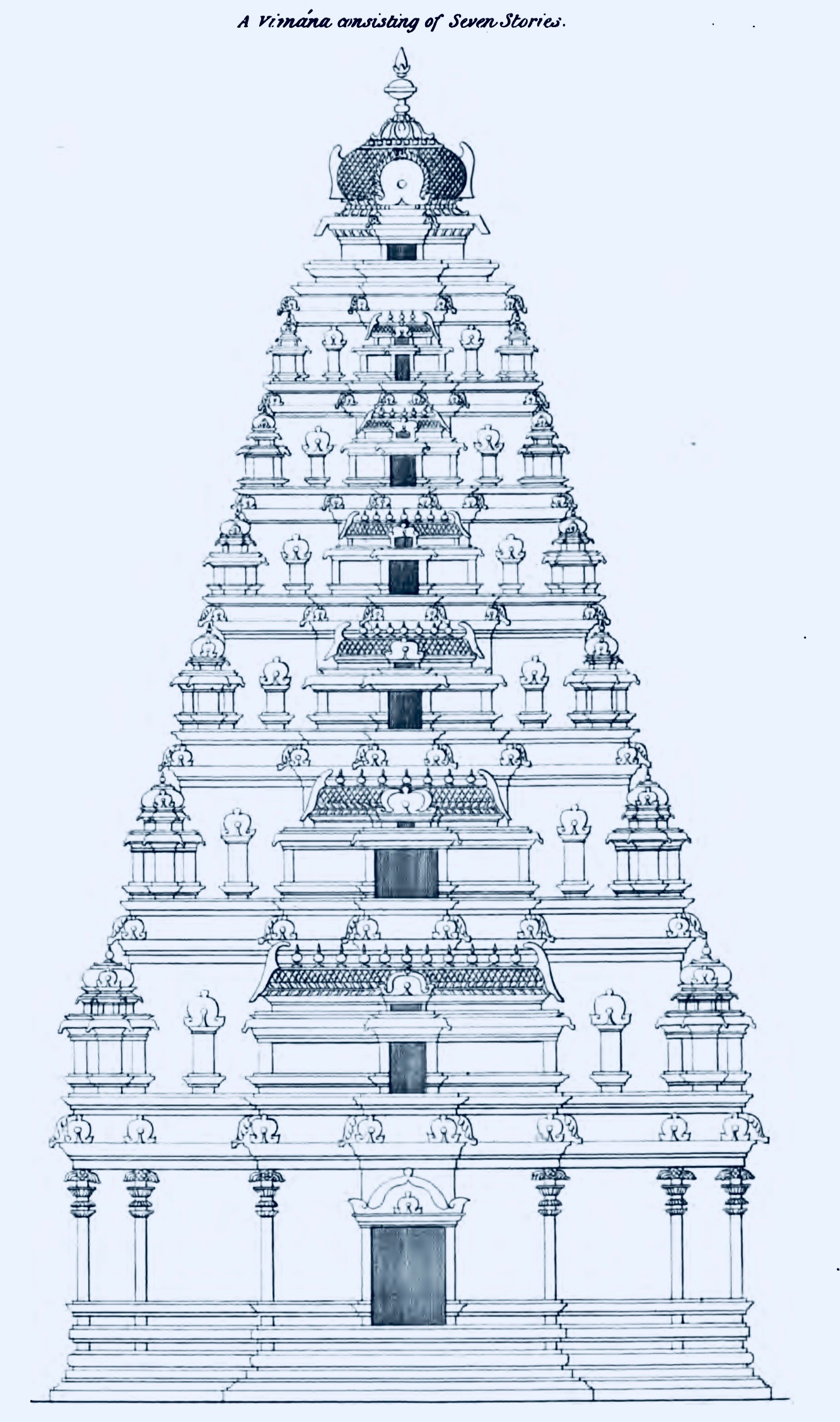
A seven-storey vimana

A vimana is the structure over the garbhagriha or inner sanctum in the Hindu temples of South India and Odisha in East India. In typical temples of Odisha using the Kalinga style of architecture, the vimana is the tallest structure of the temple, as it is in the shikhara towers of temples in West and North India. By contrast, in large South Indian temples, it is typically smaller than the great gatehouses or gopuram, which are the most immediately striking architectural elements in a temple complex. A vimana is usually shaped as a pyramid, consisting of several stories or tala. Vimana are divided in two groups: jati vimanas that have up to four tala and mukhya vimana that have five tala and more.

In North Indian temple architecture texts, the superstructure over the garbhagriha is called a shikhara. However, in South Indian Hindu architecture texts, the term shikhara means a dome-shaped crowning cap above the vimana.

== Architecture ==
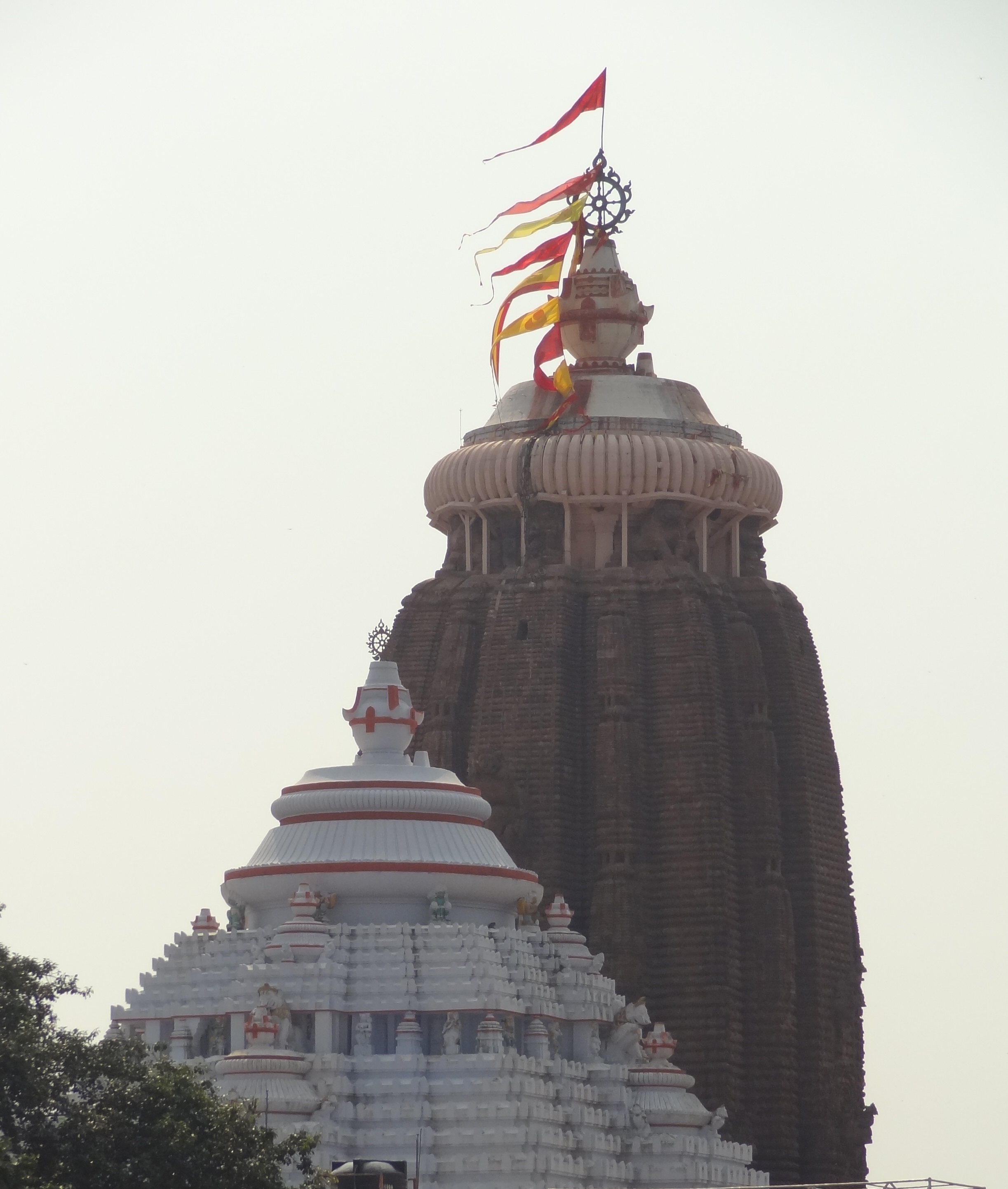
The vimana of the Jagannath Temple at Puri in the Kalinga style of architecture

A typical Hindu temple in Dravidian style have gopuram in the four cardinal directions i.e. East - main entrance, North and south - side entrances, West - only opened on auspicious days where it is believed we will go directly to Heaven. The temple's walls are typically square with the outermost wall having four gopura, one each on every side, situated exactly in the center of each wall. This will continue to next tier depending upon the size of the temple. The sanctum sanctorum and its towering roof (the central deity's shrine) are also called the vimana. Generally, these do not assume as much significance as the outer gopuram, with the exception of a few temples where the sanctum sanctorum's roofs are as famous as the temple complex itself.

The Brihadisvara Temple, Thanjavur and the Brihadisvara Temple, Gangaikonda Cholapuram, both 11th-century constructions of the Imperial Cholas, have massive and high vimanas, which is atypical in the south. These perhaps were intended to compete with the height of northern sikhara. At this time the usual gopuram was a relatively small structure over a gateway, and the development of the very tall gopuram of later centuries was perhaps influenced by these Chola vimana. This trend was well underway in Vijayanagara architecture, and has remained the case subsequently.

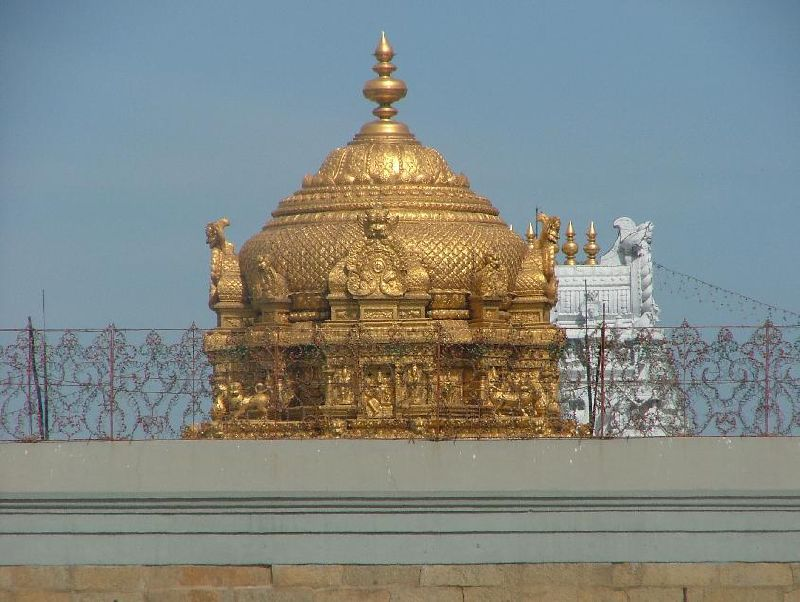
Golden shrine of Tirumala Venkateswara Temple

== Famous shrines ==
The kanaka-sabai (Golden Stage) at Nataraja Temple, Chidambaram, is another example. This shrine is entirely covered with golden plates, but is different in its structure and massive in size when compared to most other vimanas. Historical evidence states that during the ninth century, Parantaka I funded covering this vimana with ornamental gold and it retains its glory even today.

The Ananda Nilayam vimana of the Venkateswara Temple, Tirumala, is a famous example where the gopuram of the main shrine occupies a very special place in the temple's history and identity. The Meenakshi Temple has two golden vimana, a huge one for Shiva and the second one for his consort, Meenakshi.

The Jagannath Temple, Puri, has the Neelachakra on the sikhara, i.e., the top of the vimana. It is a representation of Vishnu's most powerful weapon, the sudarshana chakra.

The vimana of the Konark Sun Temple was the tallest of all vimana before it fell.

== Gallery ==
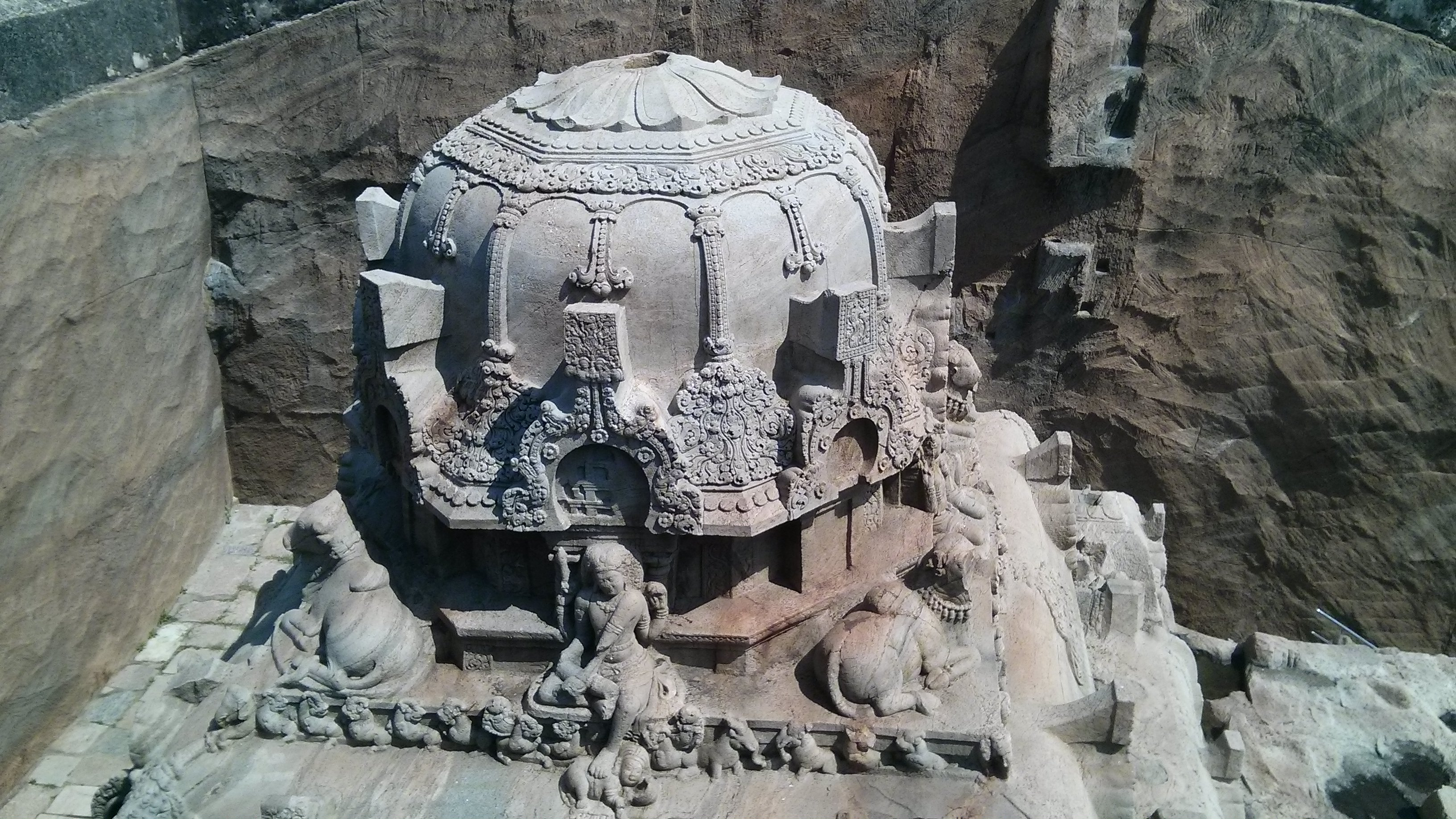
Vimanam of Vettuvan Koil, 8th century.

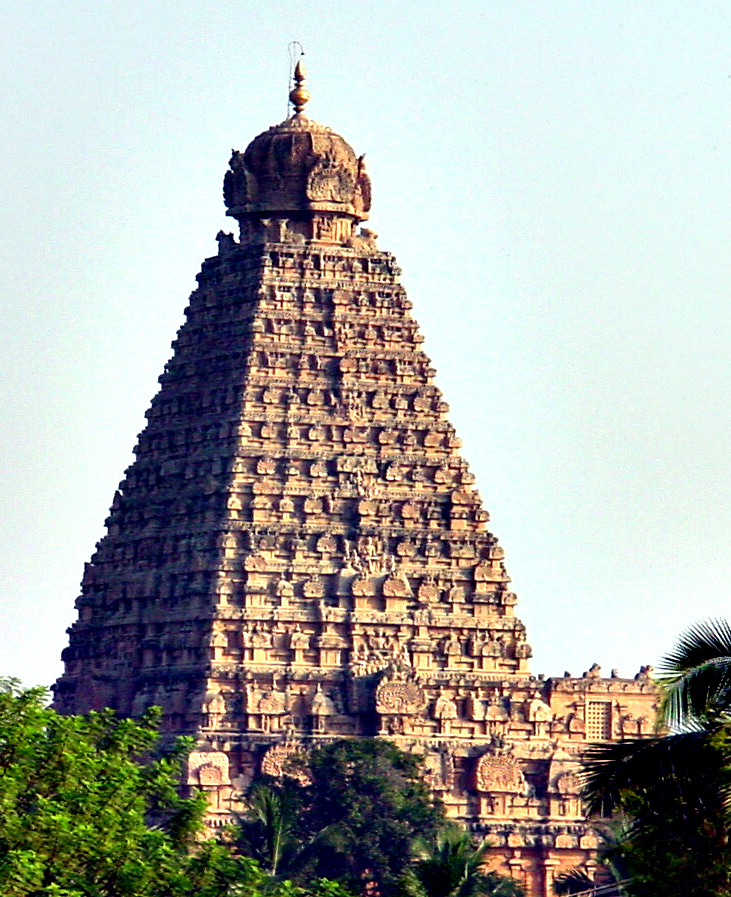
Vimana of Brihadisvara Temple, 1003 to 1010 CE

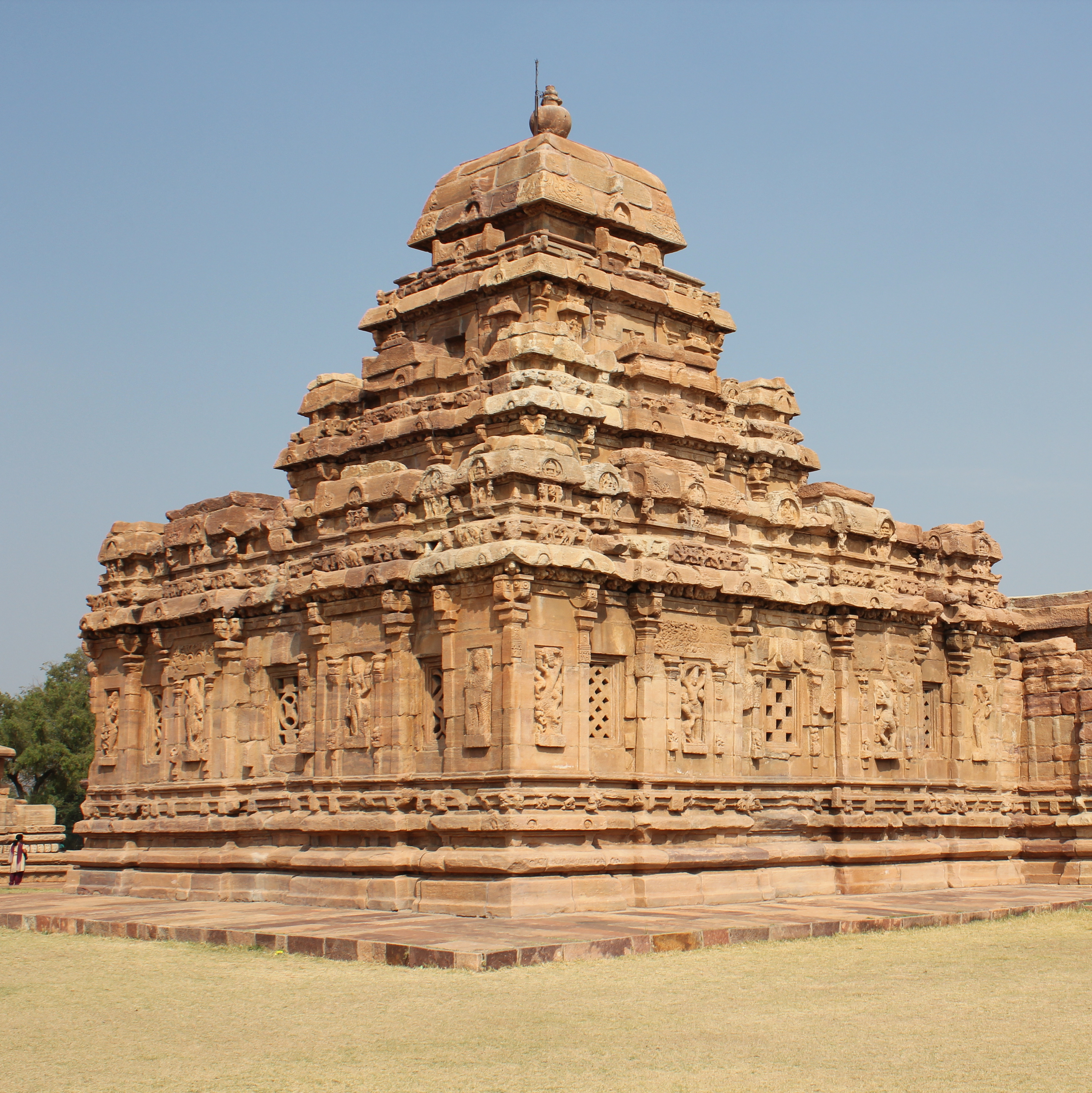
Vimana at Pattadakal, 7th century

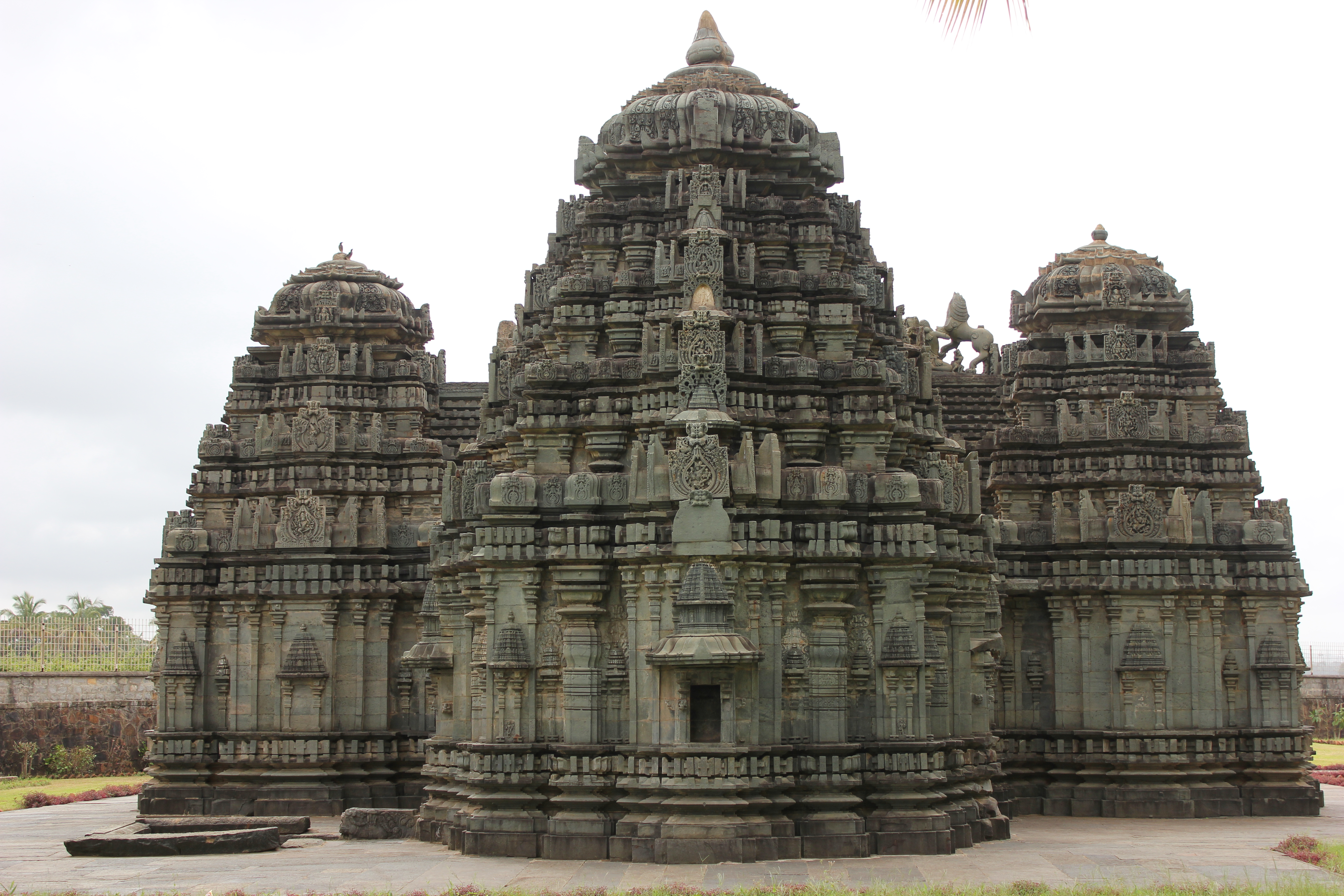
Vimana of Kerdareshvara, 11th century

== See also ==
- Balinese temple
- Meru tower
- Shikhara
- Stupa
- Hindu temple architecture
- List of tallest Vimanams
