= Tala (name) =

Tala is a female or unisex name that can be found in various ethnic groups. Many people share this name, but its meaning and background varies depending on the culture and language.

- In Persian, Tala (Persian: طلا, also romanized as Ţalā) is a female given name meaning gold.
- In Arabic, Tala (Arabic: تالا, also romanized as Tāla, Tālā) is a female given name meaning little palm tree.
- In Swedish, Norwegian, Danish and Icelandic, Tala is a variant of old high Germanic Adalheidis. This is the oldest Scandinavian version of this name, older than 'Tale' which is more commonly used today. The early use of the name Tala in Swedish is attested by its appearance in high medieval ballads such as the 14th century ballad "Herr Holger". The Finnish version of this name is spelled Taala.
- In Tagalog the name means bright star; also the name of the goddess of the morning star.
- In Samoan, Tala means a tale or narration.
- In Angola, Tala is a unisex name that means "to see or observe" in various Bantu languages, including Kikongo, Umbundu and Kimbundu.

Notable people with the name include:

- Tala Ashe (born 1984), Iranian actress
- Tala Birell (1907–1958), Romanian-American stage and film actress
- Tala Gouveia (born 1988), British actress
- Tala Hadid, American film director and producer
- Tala Madani (born 1981), American artist
- Tala Marandi, Indian politician in Jharkhand
- Tala Mi Daw, 14th century, first wife of King Razadarit of Hanthawaddy
- Tala Mi Saw, 15th-century princess of Hanthawaddy Pegu
- Tala Mi Thiri, 14th-century princess of the Martaban–Hanthawaddy Kingdom
- Tala Raassi, American fashion designer
- Tala Shin Saw Bok, 14th-century queen of Martaban
- Tala Tudu (born 1972), Indian writer in Santali

Fictional characters:

- Lady (Fru) Tala, the evil wife of the titular character of the Swedish folk ballad "Herr Holger"
- Tala, supervillainess of the Phantom Stranger in DC Comics
- Tala, also called Wistala, the primary character in the second book in the Age of Fire series
- Tala, a protagonist-turned-antagonist in the video game Darkwatch
- Tala, in the film I Can't Think Straight
- Tala Valkov, member of the Demolition Boys (also known as the Blitzkrieg Boys) from the anime/manga series Beyblade
- Tala, a character from the Wolf Pact series by Melissa de la Cruz
- Tala, Moana's grandmother in the Disney film Moana
- Tala, pet monkey belonging to Shimmer in Shimmer and Shine on Nickelodeon
- Tala, bride and sister of the female protagonist in the 2020 film Palm Springs
- Tala, in the British animated series Go Jetters

== See also ==
- Tala (disambiguation)
- Tola (name)
