= Thala =

Thala may refer to:

== Places ==
- Thala Hills, Antarctica
- Thala Island, Antarctica
- Thala Rock, Antarctica
- Thala, Tunisia, a town in Kasserine Governorate

== Other uses ==
- Thala (2021 film), an Indian independent children's film
- Thala (2025 film), an Indian Telugu-language film
- Thala (gastropod), a genus of sea snails
- Ajith Kumar (born 1971), Indian actor known as Thala
- Battle of Thala, second century BC battle between Rome and Jugurtha of Numidia
- MS Dhoni (born 1981), Indian cricketer known as Thala

== See also ==
- Tala (disambiguation)
