= Mayari =

Ethnic Filipino deity

Mayari/Malayari
- Lunar deity
- Symbol: Moon
- Gender: Female (Kapampangan and Tagalog), Male (Sambal)
- Region: Pampanga, Southern Tagalog, Zambales

Genealogy
- Parents: Bathala
- Siblings: Apolaki (Kapampangan), Tala, and Hanan (Tagalog)

In Kapampangan mythology, Mayari is the goddess of the moon and ruler of the world during nighttime. Mayari is also a goddess of beauty, war, revolution, strength, weaponry and the hunt. She is one of the many moon gods in Philippine mythology

== In Kapampangan mythology ==
In Kampampangan mythology, Bathala, the creator of the world, Leave without a will. His children Apolaki and Mayari had a quarrel, for each wanted to rule the world alone. The two fought out the conflict with bamboo clubs (Zabbors), back and forth they fought until at last Apolaki struck Mayari in the face and she became blind in one eye. When he saw his sister stricken, Apolaki took pity on her and agreed to rule the earth together but at different times. However, her light is dimmer than her brother's due to the loss of her eye.

== Appearance ==
Mayari is a beautiful woman often wearing intricately designed clothes and is adorned with beads, jewelry and historical accessories. She is also often depicted carrying weapons such as the baston, yantok and fighting sticks. The fighting sticks she uses are the ones used on Filipino martial art Arnis. Her one eye glows brighter than the other one which is scarred and sightless. In modern depictions, she is often shown with celestial designs and has tattoos and warrior marks.

== See also ==
- Deities of Philippine mythology
- List of lunar deities
