= Technology Alert List =

US Consular Security list

The Technology Alert List (TAL) is a list developed by the United States federal government of critical fields where it would like to limit the transfer of goods, technology, and sensitive information, with the goal of supporting nonproliferation of weapons of mass destruction and nontransfer of U.S.-held technologies. The list is intended as guidance for consular officers reviewing visa applications for activities such as graduate-level studies, teaching, conducting research, participating in exchange programs, receiving training or employment.

== History ==
The TAL was first introduced by the U.S. Department of State in November 2000. The list was updated in August 2002 based on heightened security concern in response to the September 11 attacks.

The TAL and related use of Security Advisory Opinions (via the Visas Mantis program) was described by Janice L. Jacobs, Deputy Assistant Secretary for Visa Services at the U.S. Department of State, in testimony before the Committee on Science U.S. House of Representatives on March 26, 2003 and before the Committee on House Small Business on June 4, 2003. It was also described by Edward Ramotowski, Director, Office of Public and Diplomatic Liaison Visa Services at the U.S. Department of State, in remarks to the National Science Board on October 16, 2003.

The TAL and several related topics were covered in the report "Review of Export Controls for Foreign Persons Employed at Companies and Universities" by the United States Department of State and the Broadcasting Board of Governors Office of Inspector General in April 2004.

== The list of sensitive subjects ==
As of August 2002, the list of critical fields, also known as sensitive subjects, has fifteen items as follows:

- A. Conventional munitions
- B. Nuclear technology
- C. Rocket systems
- D. Rocket system and unmanned air vehicle (UAV) subsystems
- E. Navigation, avionics, and flight control usable in rocket systems and unmanned air vehicles (UAV)
- F. Chemical, biotechnical, and biomedical engineering
- G. Remote sensing, imaging, and reconnaissance
- H. Advanced computer / microelectronic technology
- I. Materials technology
- J. Information security
- K. Laser and directed energy systems technology
- L. Sensors and sensor technology
- M. Marine technology
- N. Robotics
- O. Urban planning (this is a special item that may not fall under the purview of INA Section 212)

== Use of the list in processing visa applications ==
=== Review by consular officers ===
When reviewing visa applications where the applicant's proposed activity would be related to any of the fifteen sensitive subjects listed in the TAL, the consular officer must first review the activity in light of the following broad policy objectives regarding technology transfer:

- Stem proliferation of weapons of mass destruction and missile delivery systems.
- Restrain the development of destabilizing conventional military capabilities in certain regions of the world.
- Prevent the transfer of arms and sensitive dual use items to terrorist states.
- Maintain U.S. advantages in certain militarily critical technologies.

Second, if the applicant is from any of the countries designated by the U.S. Department of State as one of the state sponsors of terrorism (a list that includes Syria, Iran, North Korea, and Cuba as of April 2021) consular officers must assume that any visit providing any exposure to any of the fifteen sensitive technologies will conflict with the policy objectives, and seek a Security Advisory Opinion under the Visas Mantis program.

Third, consular officers may send to Washington (for a Security Advisory Opinion) any case that appears to warrant further interagency review (via the Visas Mantis program). Other than the state sponsors of terrorism, other countries from which visa applicants tend to be subject to more scrutiny if involved with any of the sensitive subjects are the countries that possess some nuclear capability and are deemed "non-proliferation export countries": China, India, Israel, Pakistan, and Russia.

== See also ==
- Security Advisory Opinion
- State Sponsors of Terrorism (U.S. list)
