= Gopuram =

Monumental gateway tower to Hindu temple complexes

Gopuram
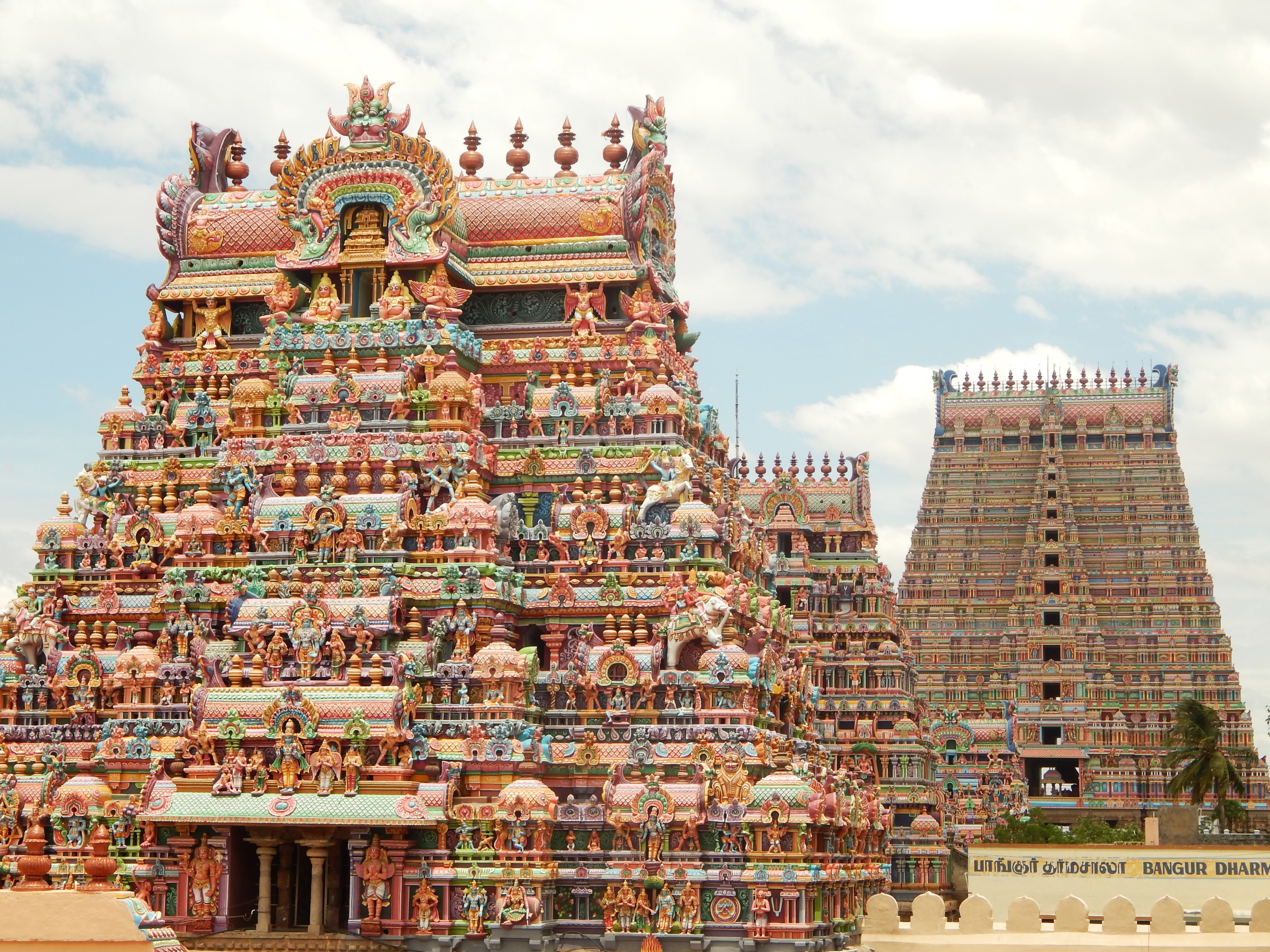
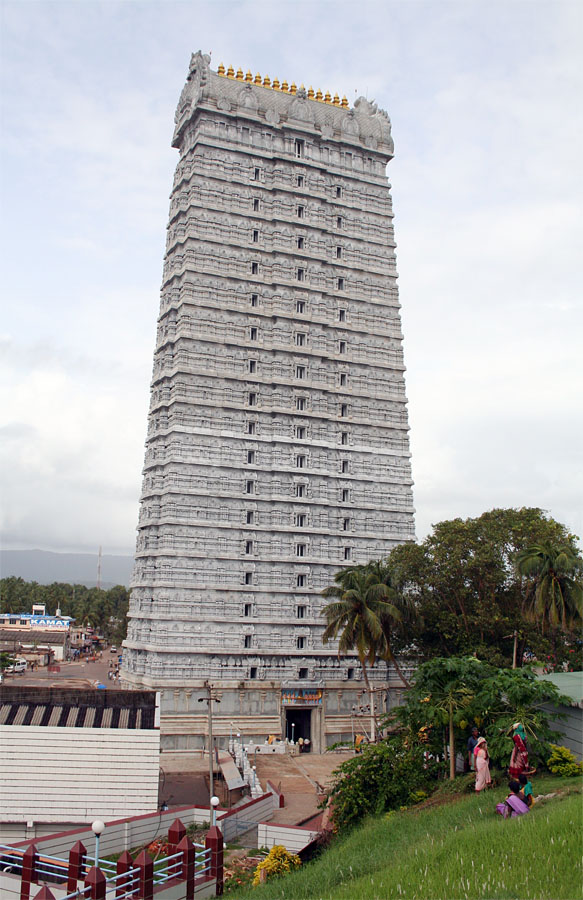
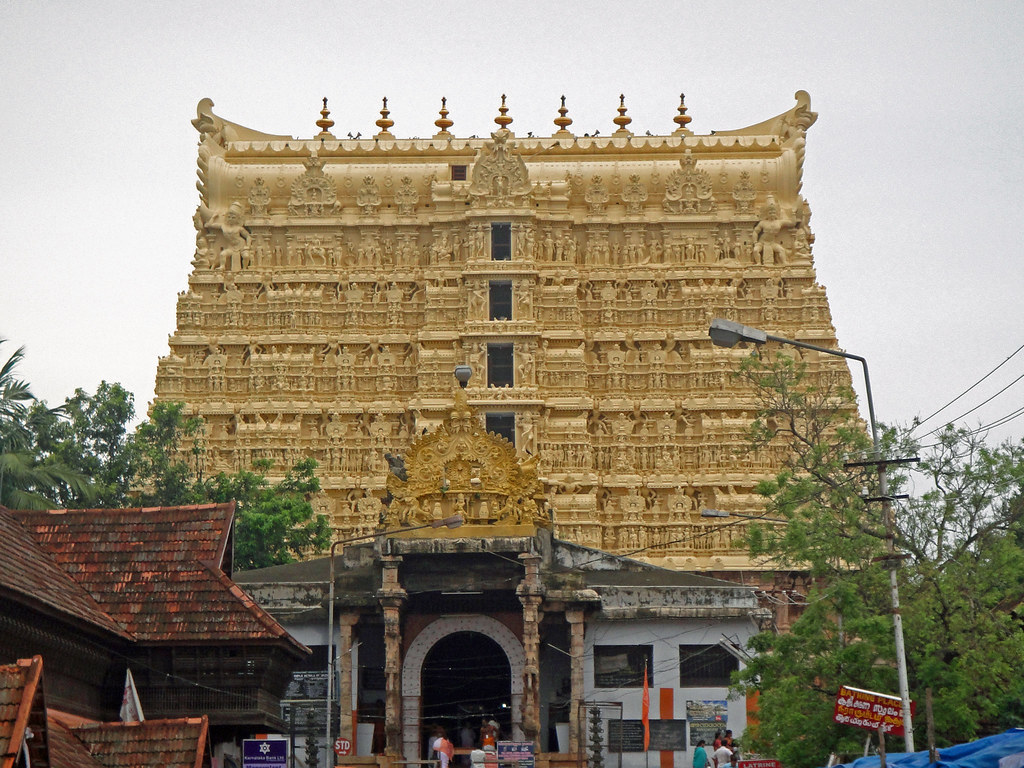
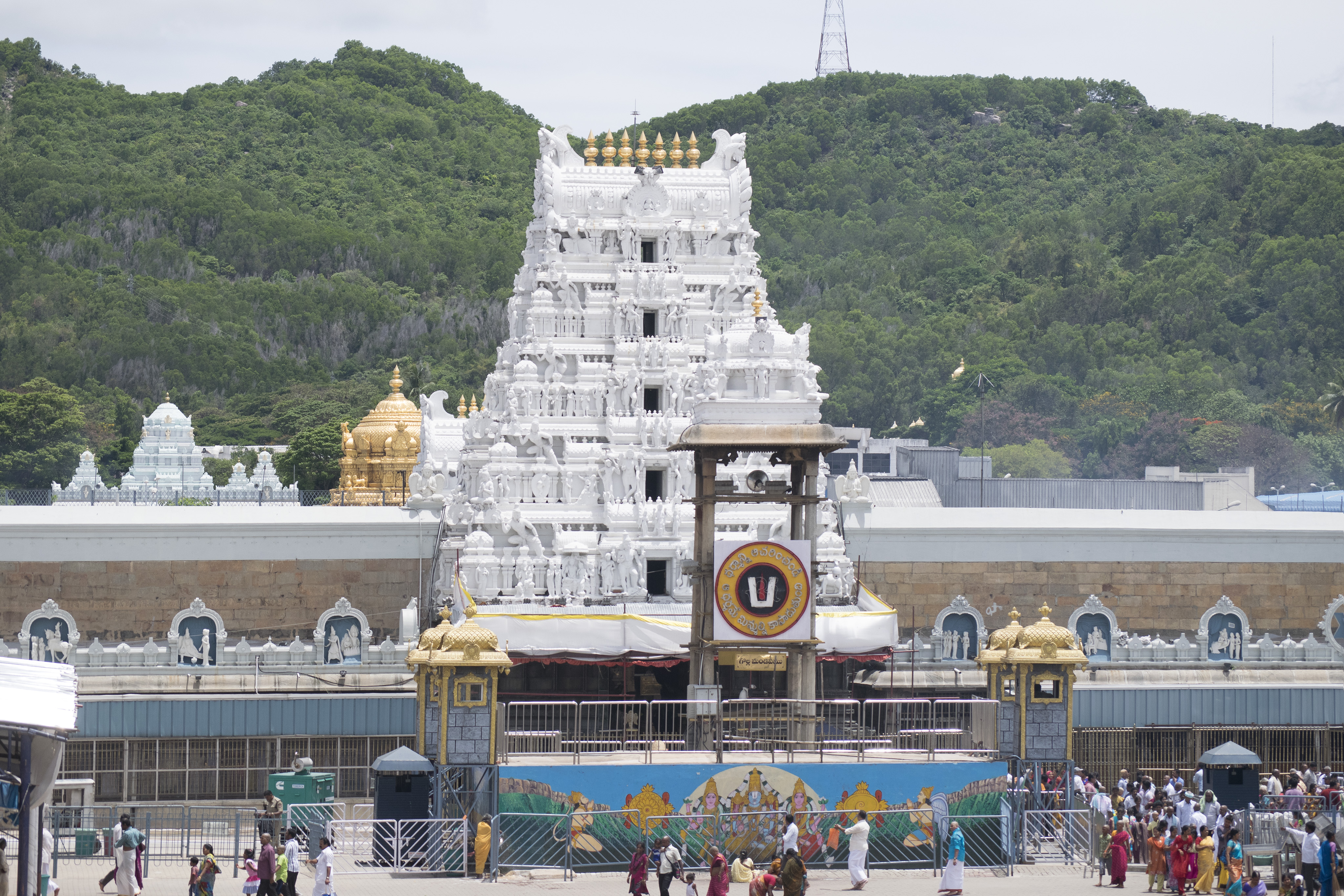
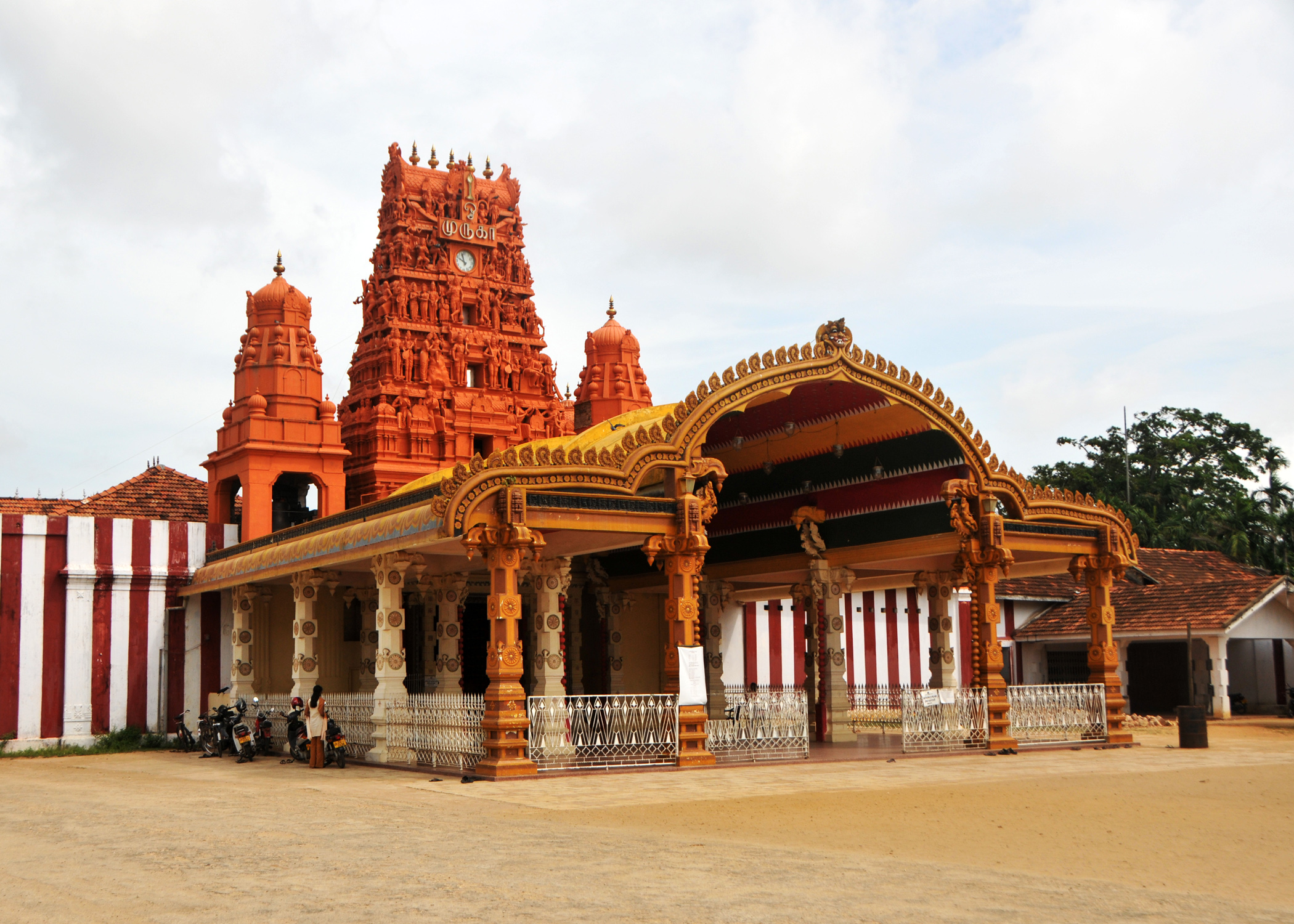
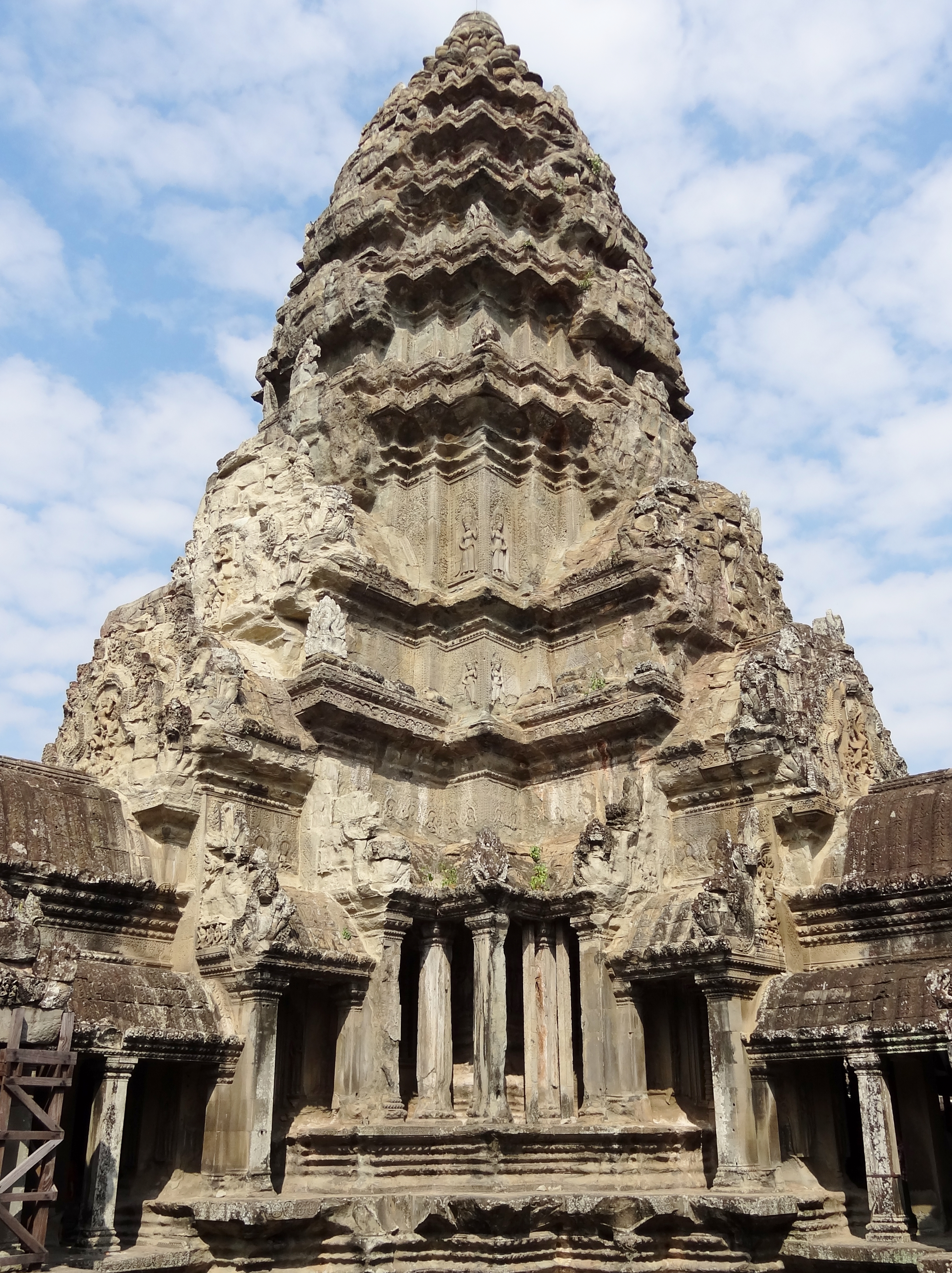
Gopurams from various temples; Left to right:
1. Ranganathaswamy Temple, Srirangam
2. Murudeshwar Temple
3. Padmanabhaswamy Temple, Thiruvananthapuram
4. Venkateswara Temple, Tirumala
5. Nallur Kandaswamy Temple
6. Angkor Wat

A gopuram or gopura is a monumental, usually ornate entrance tower of a Hindu temple in the Dravidian architecture of South India and Sri Lanka. In other parts of India, temple entrance towers are generally more modest, whereas in the South, the gopuram is often the tallest structure in the temple complex and taller than the vimana tower over the main shrine. They also appear in temple design outside India, such as the Khmer architecture in Southeast Asia.

Gopurams function as gateways to the temple complex and their interiors are essentially empty, though they may be used for storage. Typically multi-storeyed, their upper tiers repeat lower-level features on a rhythmically diminishing scale. Their exterior surfaces are adorned with intricate sculptures and detailed ornamentation. The sculptures are usually brightly-painted plaster. They are crowned by one or more kalasams, which are bulbous metal or stone finials. Their design and construction follow the classical rules laid down in Vaastu Shastra texts.

Ancient and early medieval temples featured smaller gopurams, which became a prominent element of Hindu temple architecture in the late Middle Ages. The gopuram's origins can be traced back to the Pallavas. As temples expanded between the 12th and 16th centuries under the Pandya, Vijayanagara, and Nayak rulers, progressively larger gopurams were constructed along the outer enclosure walls.

The tallest gopuram is the rajagopuram of the Ranganathaswamy Temple in Srirangam, standing 239.5 ft (73.0 m) tall and completed in 1987.

== Etymology ==
In historical linguistics, gopuram is derived from go (Sanskrit: गो) meaning 'cow', 'earth' or 'cattle', and puram (Sanskrit: पुरम्) meaning 'city', 'fortress' or 'enclosure'. Originally, in Vedic and ancient urban layouts, a gopuram referred to a city gate or cow gate—a fortified gateway through which cattle entered the settlement/city walls. Over centuries, as Hindu temple architecture expanded in South India, the term evolved to describe the massive gateway towers set into temple enclosure walls (prākāra).

In the Tamil language, gopuram is interpreted as கோ (kō) meaning 'king' (or 'god') and புறம் (puram) meaning 'exterior' or 'outer palace wall'. During the Sangam period, it was referred in classical literature (e.g., Akananuru, Silappatikaram) as ஓங்கு நிலை வாயில் (ōnggu meaning high/lofty, nilai meaning standing/structure, vāyil meaning entrance), meaning 'lofty/towering threshold'.

In Telugu, the breakdown of కోపు (kōpu) meaning 'top' (or 'crest') and అరం (araṁ), meaning 'to exist' is a localized folk etymology. While kōpu in Telugu refers to a crest or top decoration, modern comparative linguistics generally treats gopuram as a loan word from Sanskrit/Tamil into Telugu rather than an independent native compound.

== History ==
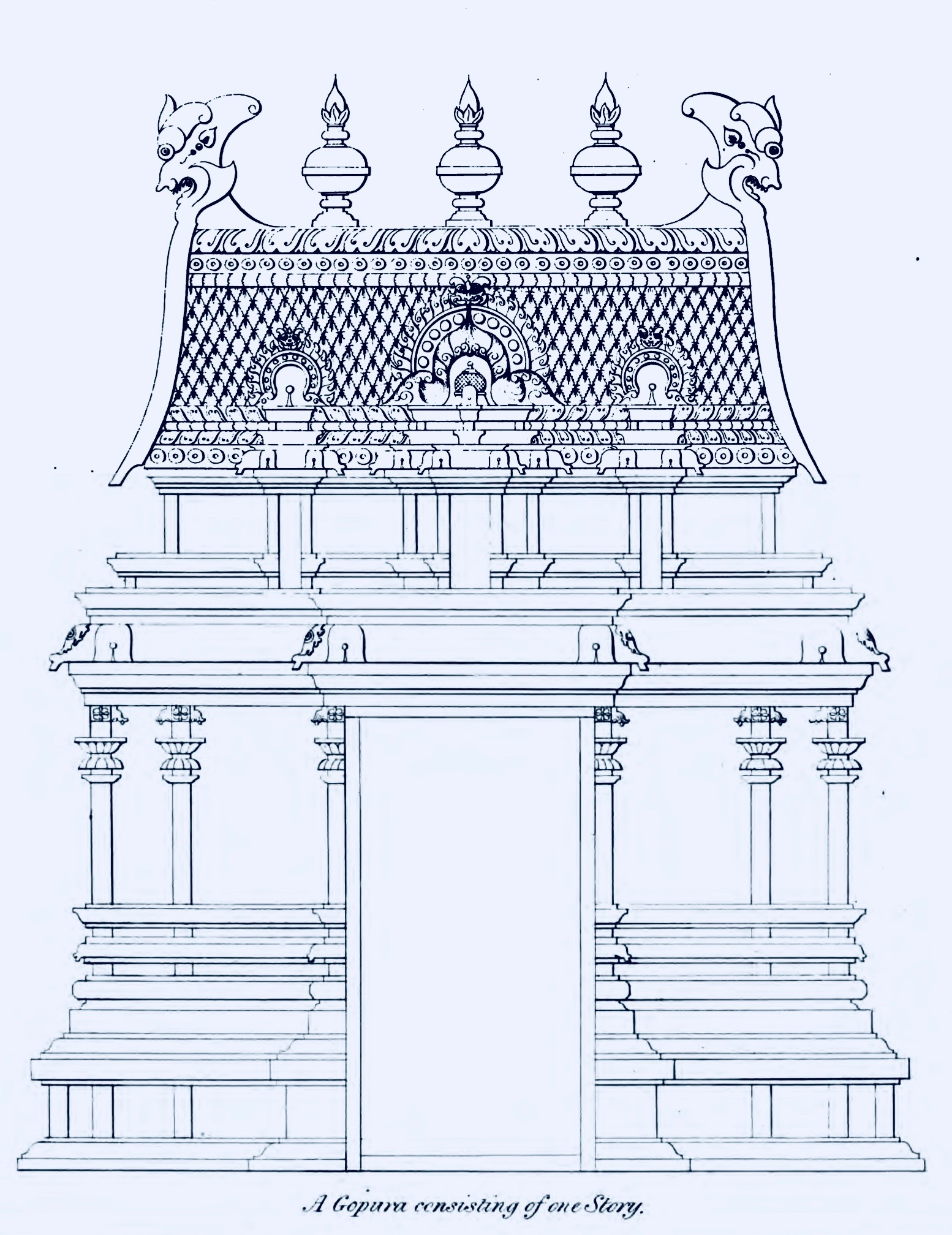
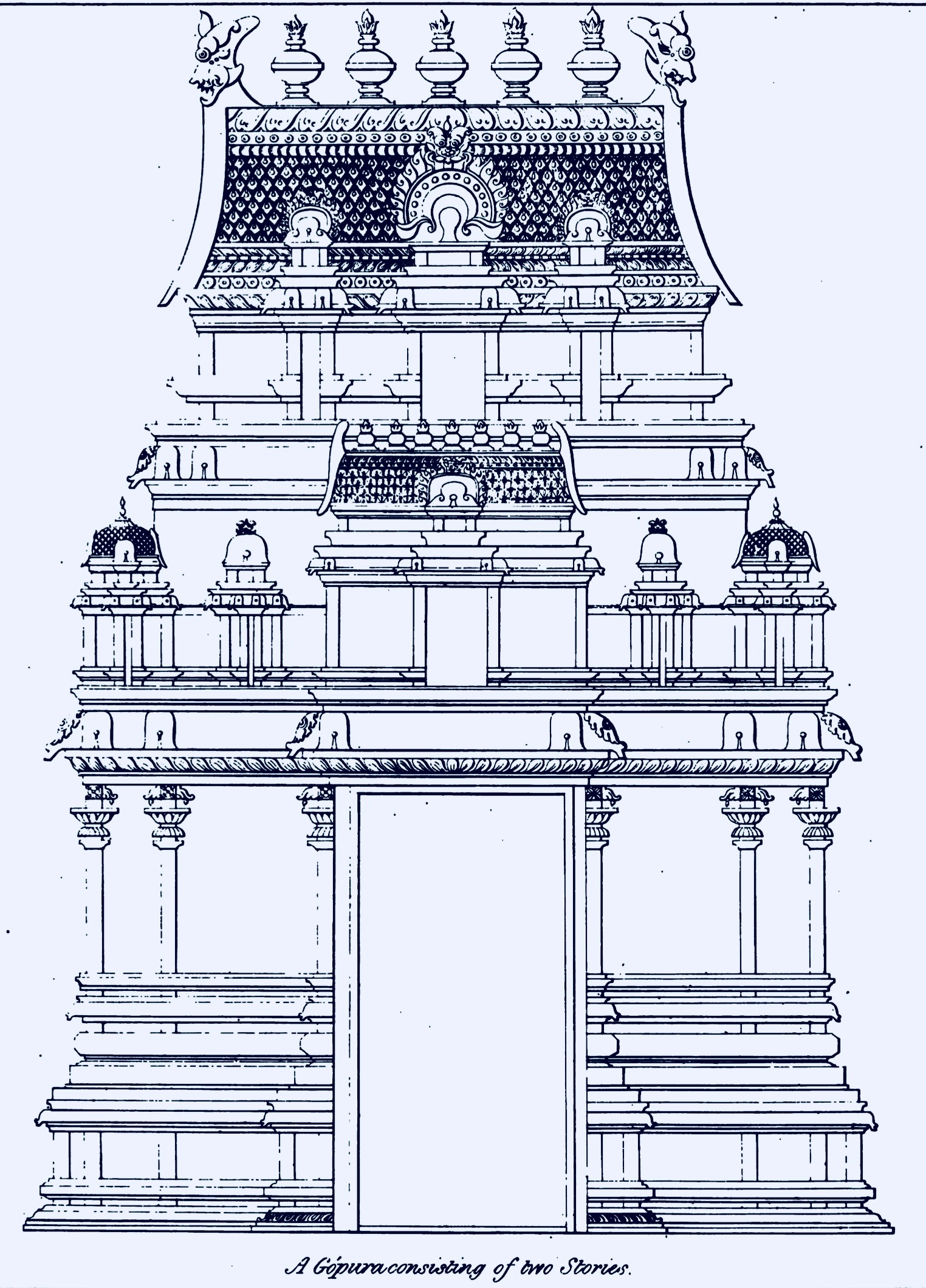
A gopuram may have multiple storeys. Left: Single storey; Right: Two stories

The origin of the gopurams can be traced back to the Pallavas, who constructed the group of monuments at Mahabalipuram and Kanchipuram. The Cholas later developed this feature further, as seen in the 11th-century Brihadisvara Temple in Thanjavur and the slightly later temple at Gangaikonda Cholapuram; They feature multi-storey gopurams that were significantly larger than earlier examples, though were still dwarfed by the central vimana over the garbagriha (sanctum). These vimanas were in the form of pyramids with four sides of equal length. Both these temples were new foundations on empty sites; where existing temples were being ambitiously extended it was preferred to add one or more large gate-towers than to replace the vimana, which was often regarded as very ancient and sacred. For these a form that kept two long faces over the gateway, with the two end or side faces much shorter, was practical, and extended the shape of existing gatehouses. The tapering shape, reducing in size with each additional storey, became normal.

By the time of Pandya rule in the 12th century, these gateways had become the tallest and dominant element of a temple's exterior. The gopurams of the Thillai Nataraja Temple in Chidambaram are amongst the earliest examples of the large gopurams that emerged in the mid-13th century.

As temples complexes expanded between the 12th and 16th centuries under the Vijayanagara Empire, and Nayakas, increasingly massive gopurams were constructed along the outer enclosure walls. While gopurams originally served as secondary entrance markers, they eventually became the defining visual feature of the South Indian temples. Their colossal scale and surrounding courtyards ultimately overshadowed the inner vimana, obstructing them from outside view.

== Architecture ==
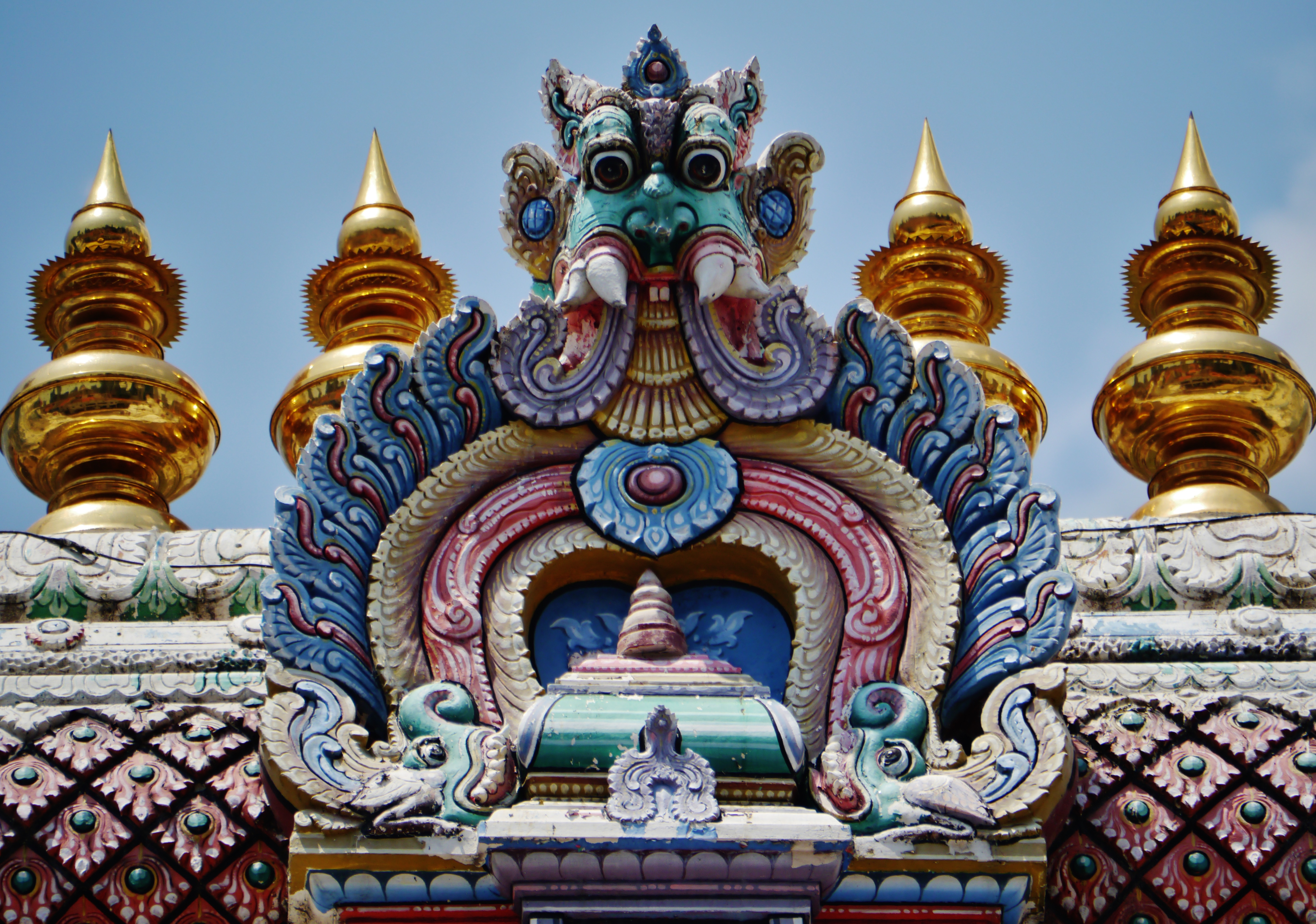
Closeup showing bronze kalashas (finial) and kirtimukha

The gopurams are designed and constructed according to principles of Vaastu Shastra texts. They are usually tapering oblong structures with ground-level, often richly decorated wooden doors that provide access. Above the entrance rises the tapering or "battered" gopuram tower, divided into multiple storeys (talas) that diminish in scale as they ascend. The tower is usually topped with a barrel-vaulted roof crowned with finials (kalasam). Their surfaces are often exquisitely decorated with brightly-painted sculptures and carvings, with themes and scenes derived from Hindu mythology—particularly those associated with the temple's presiding deity.

Gopurams function as gateways to the temple complex, and their interiors are essentially empty, though they may be used for storage. A temple may have multiple gopurams over the entrances of successively smaller walled enclosures, with the largest generally positioned on the outermost perimeter. The temple compound is typically square or rectangular, with gopurams built over the entrances on the enclosure walls, often facing any or all of the four cardinal directions.

== See also ==
- Candi bentar – Type of gate in Indonesian architecture
- Paduraksa – Type of gateway found in Indonesia
- Pagoda – Usually religious tower in Asian countries
