= Security Advisory Opinion =

U.S. visa review process

Security Advisory Opinion (SAO) or Washington Special Clearance, commonly called security clearance, administrative clearance, or administrative processing, is a process the United States Department of State and the diplomatic missions of the United States use in deciding to grant or deny a United States visa to certain visa applicants. The process involves sending a request from the visa issuing post to the Department of State's headquarters in Washington, D.C., to investigate an individual's case for possible espionage, terrorism, and illegal export of technology out of the United States.

Apart from the Department of State, the process involves other agencies of the federal government of the United States, especially those under Department of Homeland Security. Some of the agencies involved are: FBI, CIA, Drug Enforcement Administration, U.S. Department of Commerce, Department of Treasury's Office of Foreign Assets Control, and the Department of State's Bureau of International Security and Nonproliferation. The process may also include checking with Interpol.

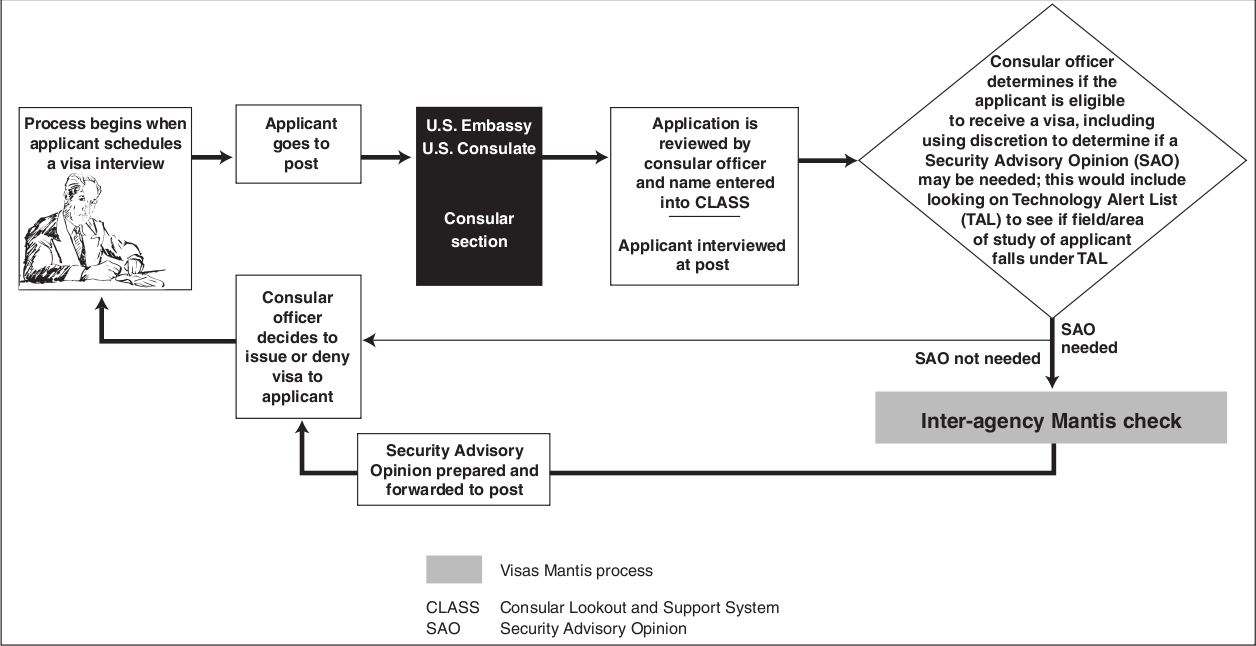
The process for issuing a United States visa, possibly including a Visas Mantis check

SAOs have been the source of long delays for determining if a non-U.S. citizen should be issued a visa or not. As a result, United States Government Accountability Office found in a report dated February 2004 that "students and scholars with science backgrounds might decide not to come to the United States, and technological advancements that serve U.S. and global interests could be jeopardized" as a result.

In mid-2003, SAOs were submitted for about 2% of the applicants. The Department of State processed 245,000 SAOs in FY 2006, and has processed over a million SAOs in the period from September 2001 to May 2007.

== Types ==
There are various types of SAOs, usually named after various animals, with two named after legendary characters.

As of August 2006, these included:

- Visas Mantis: potential illegal transfer of sensitive or dual-use technology, which was introduced in 1998
- Visas Bear: for foreign government officials, representatives to international organizations, and their families
- Visas Donkey: name hits, certain nationalities
- Visas Merlin: refugees and asylees
- Visas Eagle: certain nationals of Cuba, China, Iran, Russia
- Visas Condor: certain nationalities, introduced in January 2002
- Visas Hawk: for immigrant visas
- Visas Viper: for suspected terrorists

There are also other types of SAOs used for notifying the Department of State about visa issuance and that the applicant will be traveling to the United States, including:

- Visas Horse: diplomatic visa holders of certain nationalities
- Visas Pegasus: officials of Commonwealth of Independent States

== Validity period ==
The validity of the clearance (which specifies a deadline for the time a visa could be issued) is based on its type, and ranges between three and 48 months. During the period of validity, posts can usually issue another visa for the applicant without requesting a new SAO if the applicant's circumstances have not changed much.

== Issuing time ==
The Department of State claims that 80% of SAOs are cleared within two weeks, but the general expected time for a clearance is unknown. While various diplomatics posts mention some average times (the website of the United States embassy in Ankara, Turkey, mentions up to six to eight weeks), this only reflects the recent experience of the post, and does not reflect actual statistics.

The Department of State's Foreign Affairs Manual (which is a reference for diplomatic posts), dated August 16, 2006, mentions:

... posts can expect a wait of a minimum of twenty (20) business days to receive responses, although some responses will arrive well within that time frame. However, complicated cases can take some time to resolve, particularly if there are other U.S. Government agency concerns to consider.

According to a report by the United States Government Accountability Office, as of November 30, 2004, 87% of Visas Mantis cases (one of the various kinds of SAOs) has been cleared in 30 days or less, 5% were taking 31–60 days, 5% were taking 61–90 days, 1% were taking 91–120 days and the final 2% were taking more than 120 days. The average time was 15 days, which was significantly reduced, as the same report mentions that during October 2003, the average was 75 days. On February 11, 2005, the Department of State mentioned that it "has been able to decrease the average time to obtain Visas Mantis clearance to less than 14 days".

A presentation attributed to the Department of State dated November 6, 2008, says that the average time the Visas Mantis clearances take as 6 to 8 weeks.

According to the U.S. Department of State website, most cases applied for in Beijing should be cleared within 60 days, but 90 days are also expected.

As of February 2010, the U.S. consulate in Dubai is reporting that administrative processing can delay some applications for 175 days (~6 months) or more.

As reported by some Chinese media in 2019, the U.S. consulate in China delayed over 1000 Chinese F-1 applications for over 6 months, most of whom are graduate STEM students.
