= Inchtalla =

Island in the Lake of Menteith, Scotland

Coordinates: 56°10′29″N 4°18′7″W

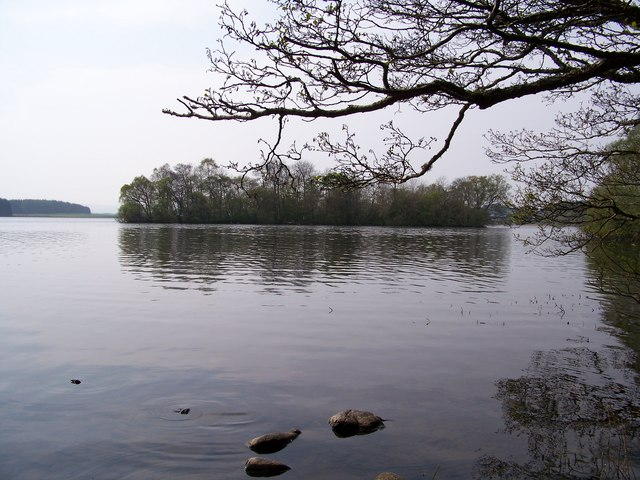
Inchtalla, viewed from Inchmahome

Inchtalla or Inch Talla is an island in the Loch or Lake of Menteith in central Scotland. Its name derives from the Gaelic words innis ("island") and "talla" ("hall").

The entire island is dominated by Talla Castle, which appears to have been built in the 18th century. It was erected on the site of an earlier building that dates from 1428.

Isle of Monteith [Inchtalla]. Agreement, Countess of Airth and William, Earl of Monteith 'the haill rooms within the hall door with the second chamber nixt the hall called the schoolhouse and the north chamber nixt adjacent to the hall to be of equell use whenever occasions offers of any of the said countess hir relations or yet the said earl's (being men of quallitie) and the kitching and brewhous to be of common use for serving both parties, and the said Earl to have the littellvoult east the turnpyk on the South syd of the cloass'. (Scottish Record office, 1667)

== See also ==
- List of places in Stirling (district)
- List of places in Scotland
