= Tal (name) =

Tal is a given name and a surname of Hebrew origin meaning "dew". It is a popular name in Israel for boys and girls.

== Given name ==
=== Men ===
- Tal Aizik (born 1993), Israeli professional Dota 2 video game player
- Tal Alexander (born 1986), American real-estate agent and multi-millionaire
- Tal Bachman (born 1968), Canadian singer
- Tal Ben Haim (born 1982), Israeli footballer
- Tal Ben Haim (footballer, born 1989) (born 1989), Israeli footballer
- Tal Brody (born 1943), Israeli-American Euroleague basketball player
- Tal Dunne (born 1987), Welsh-born Israeli professional basketball player for Israeli team Ironi Nes Ziona
- Tal Erel (born 1996), Israel National Baseball Team player
- Tal Flicker (born 1992), Israeli judoka
- Tal Friedman (born 1963), Israeli actor and comedian
- Tal Kachila (born 1992), Israeli footballer
- Tal Kalay (born 1984), Israeli actor and drag performer
- Tal Karpelesz (born 1990), Israeli-Romanian basketball player
- Tal Lavin, American journalist
- Tal Russo (born 1959), retired Israel Defense Forces general
- Tal Shaked (born 1978), American chess grandmaster
- Tal Stricker (born 1979), Israeli Olympic swimmer

=== Women ===
- Tal (singer), full name Tal Benyerzi (born 1989), Israeli-born French singer
- Tal Karp (born 1981), female Australian football (soccer) player
- Tal Rabin (born 1962), Israeli computer scientist
- Tal Wilkenfeld (born 1986), Australian bassist

== Surname ==
- Alon Tal (born 1960), Israeli politician
- Alona Tal (born 1983), Israeli-American actress
- David Tal (historian) (born 1964), expert on Israel's security and diplomatic history and American disarmament policy
- David Tal (politician) (1950–2016), Israeli politician
- Erez Tal (born 1961), Israeli announcer and TV presenter
- Idan Tal (born 1975), Israeli football manager and former player
- Israel Tal (1924–2010), Israeli general, known for the development of the Merkava tank
- Josef Tal (1910–2008), Israeli composer
- Marjo Tal (1915-2006), Dutch composer
- Mikhail Tal (1936–1992), Soviet world chess champion
- Nickol Tal (born 1994), Israeli fencer
- Tobias Tal (1847–1898), Dutch rabbi
- Wasfi Tal (1919–1971), prime minister of Jordan several times; assassinated by Black September
- Yael Tal (born 1983), Israeli actress
