= Talas (name) =

Talas is a surname and a masculine given name in Turkey. It is used as a surname in Finland and was cited as one of the most common surnames of Finnish nationals by the Population Register Centre in 2023. In Turkish it has various meanings, including dust raised by the wind, storm, hurricane and corner.

Notable people with the name include:

- Cahit Talas (1917–2006), Turkish academic
- Onni Talas (1877–1958), Finnish lawyer and politician
- Zsuzsanna Király-Tálas (born 1993), Hungarian volleyball player
