= Talla Castle =

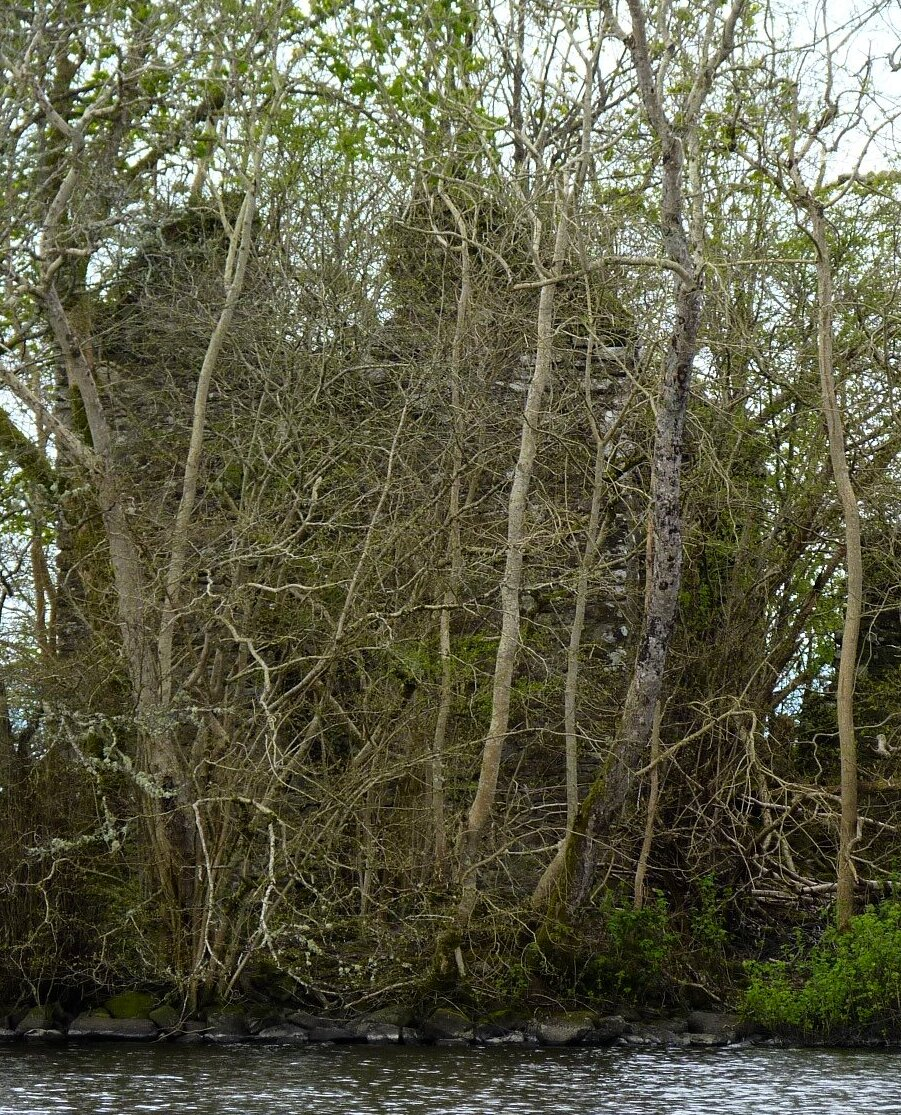

Site information
- Condition: ruined

Location
- Coordinates: 56.174826°N 4.301708°W

Site history
- Built: 15th century

Talla Castle, also known as Inch Talla or Inchtalla Castle, was a 15th-century castle on Inchtalla upon Lake of Menteith, Scotland.

The castle was built by Malise Graham, Earl of Mentieth starting in 1427.
