= Talash =

Talash or Talaash may refer to:

== People ==
- Manizha Talash, Afghan breakdancer

== Film and television ==
- Talash (1969 film), an Indian Hindi-language film by O. P. Ralhan
- Talaash: The Hunt Begins..., a 2003 Indian Hindi-language thriller film by Suneel Darshan
- Talaash: The Answer Lies Within, a 2012 Indian Hindi-language crime thriller film by Reema Kagti
- Talaash (Indian TV series), a 1992 drama series by Hrishikesh Mukherjee
- Talaash (Pakistani TV series), a 1994 mini-series featuring Junoon
- Code Red (Indian TV series), an Indian TV series, also known as Code Red Talaash

== Others ==
- Talaash (album), a 1993 album by Junoon, a Pakistani pop music group
  - "Talaash" (song)
- Talaash air defense system, an Iranian anti-aircraft missile launcher
- Talash (UAV), an Iranian drone

== See also ==
- Talas (disambiguation)
