= Tala (Hindu architecture) =

Part of a tower in Hindu temples

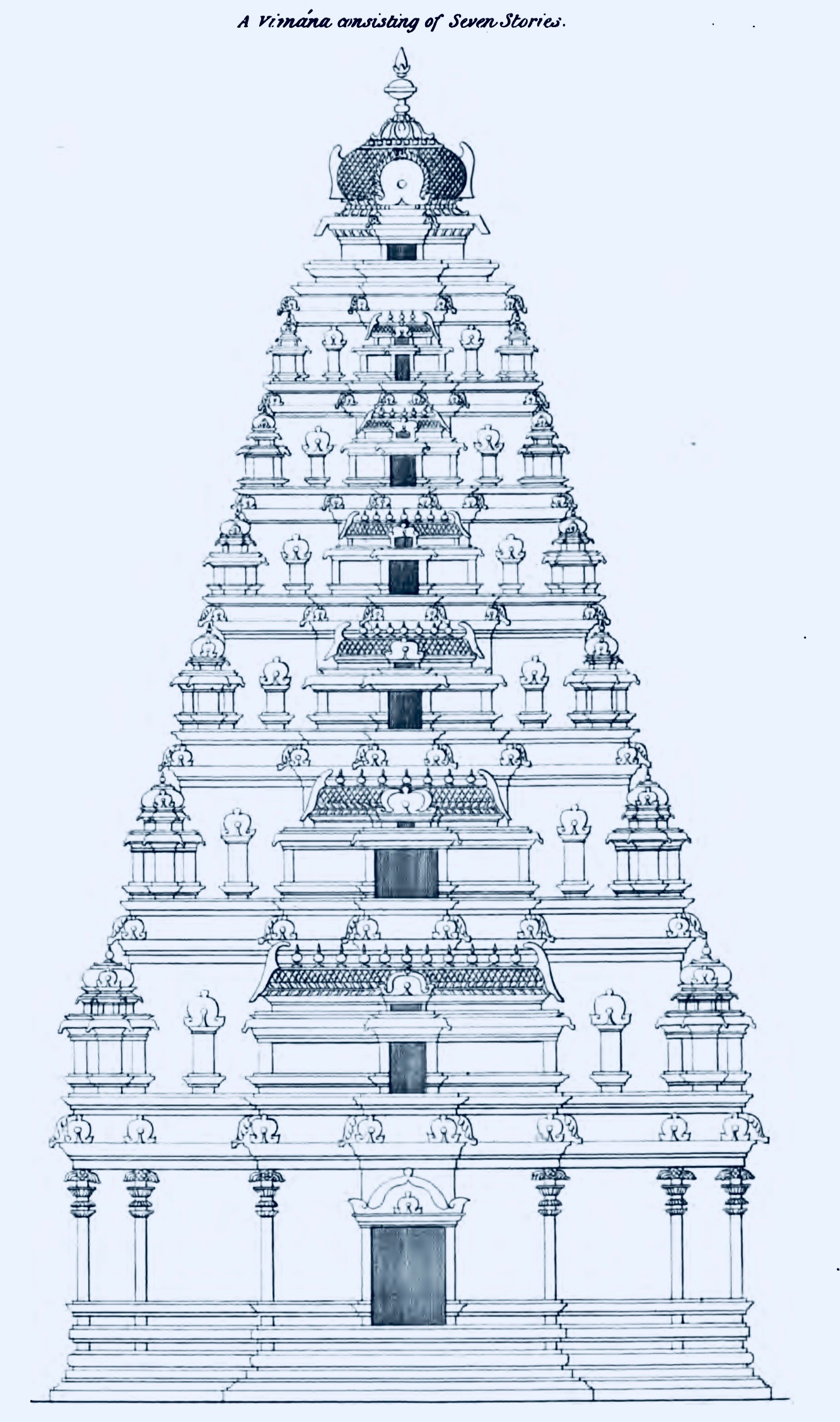
A seven-storey vimana

In Hindu temple architecture, tala (Sanskrit: तल, lit. ‘level, tier or storey’) is a horizontal division or tier of the superstructure (tower) in a Hindu temple. It is an important compositional temple element, especially prominent in Dravidian architecture, and also appears in the shikhara of Nagara-style temples and the gopuram gateway towers.

Each tala typically consists of a wall zone with pilasters and decorative elements (often miniature sculptures), decreasing in size upward to create a stepped or pyramidal profile.

== Dravidian vimanas ==
Vimanas above the sanctum are typically shaped as a four-sided pyramid, consisting of progressively smaller talas. Dravidian vimanas can be classified as one-story (called ekatala), two-story (dvi-tala), three-story (tri-tala), and so on. Usually, vimanas have up to seven stories. However, the tallest gopurams and vimanas, such as that of the Ranganathaswamy Temple in Srirangam, may have up to 13 talas.

Importantly, the kuta at the top of a vimana does not count as a separate tala. As a major horizontal division of a temple, in the middle each tala has a wall zone with slender pilasters. The side parts are usually heavily decorated with statues, which may add up to hundreds. Many temples claim that each one of such statues is unique.
