= Tala (goddess) =

Goddess in Tagalog mythology

- Goddess of stars
- Symbol: Star, Orb
- Gender: Female
- Region: Southern Tagalog

Genealogy
- Parents: Bathala
- Siblings: Mayari, Hanan

Tala, based on Hindu goddess Tara, is the name of the diwata, or goddess of the morning and evening star in Tagalog mythology. Her origins are varied depending on the region. Golden Tara, the Majapahit-era gold statue of Hindu deity Tara or Tagalog adoption Tala was found in 1918 in Agusan. The legend of Tala has very close parallels to legends among non-Filipino cultures such as the India tribes of Bihar, Savara and Bhuiya, as well as the Indianized Semang (Malay tribe).

The most popular myth of Tala is that she is one of the three daughters of Bathala to a mortal woman. Her sisters include Mayari, the goddess of the moon, and Hanan, the goddess of morning. She is known to have supported the creation of the Tagalog traditional constellations. Tala used light spheres or orbs to ferry men to safety at night. The natives' interpretation of these orbs shifted to being perceived as deadly beings that kill men or get humans to lose their way, by the influence of the Spanish-brought tradition of the santelmos.

In another, more modern story, sun god Arao (probably Apolaki) and the moon goddess Buan (probably Mayari) both had large families of stars, but Buan believed her stars could not survive the heat of Arao. They both agreed to destroy their stars. While Arao devoured his, Buan hid hers in the clouds, where they would occasionally emerge. Upon seeing this, Arao was filled with rage and is eternally in pursuit of Buan, trying to destroy her. Eclipses are explained by Arao getting close enough to bite her. At dawn, Buan hides the stars and brings them forth only when her eldest daughter, Tala (the evening and morning star) says the sun is too far away to pursue them.

Derived from this myth are the Tagalog words tala, which means "bright star", araw (sun) and buwan (moon). Tala may be short for Talamayen, which is the name of a diwata that was worshipped by the inhabitants of Luzon.

In Kapampangan mythology, a deity named Tálâ is also present. For the Kapampangans, Tálâ is the bright star and the one who introduced wet-rice culture in Pampanga.

Felipe Pardo (Archbishop of Manila 1686-1688), in his letter, mentioned an anito, which the Tagalogs from Laguna still remembered, named Bulactala. The meaning of the name is "Flower of Tala" which suggest that this anito is not a personification of Tala i.e. the planet Venus.
