= Visa policy of the United States =

Policy on permits required to enter the United States and its unincorporated territories

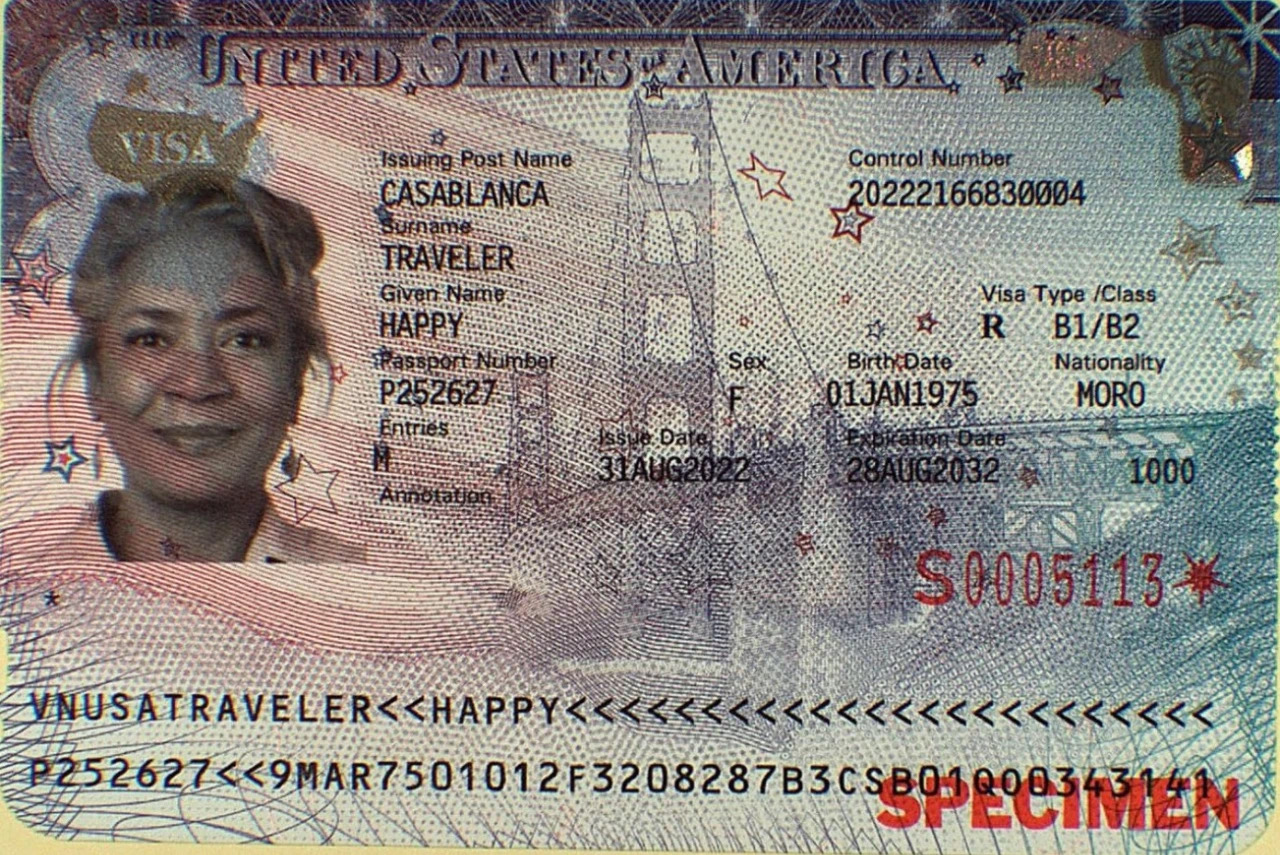
Bridge visa specimen

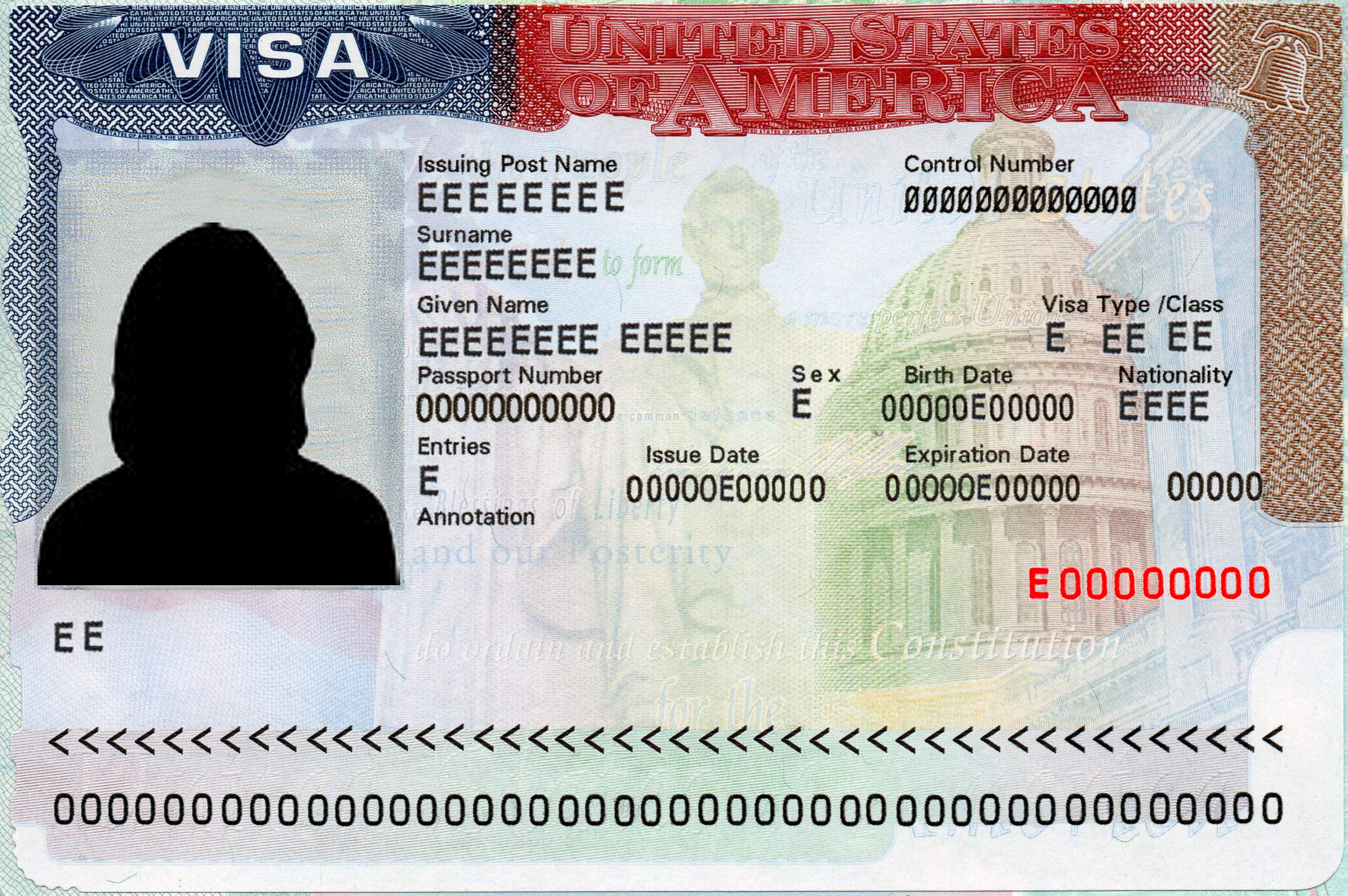
Lincoln visa specimen

Visitors to the United States must obtain a visa from one of the U.S. diplomatic missions unless they are citizens from one of the visa-exempt or Visa Waiver Program countries.

The same rules apply for travel to all U.S. states, Washington, D.C., Puerto Rico and the U.S. Virgin Islands, as well as to Guam and the Northern Mariana Islands with additional waivers, while similar but separate rules apply to American Samoa.

== Travel documents ==
The U.S. government requires all individuals entering or departing the United States by air, or entering the United States by sea from outside the Americas, to hold one of the following documents:

- U.S. passport
- Foreign passport; for entry, a U.S. visa is also required except for:
  - Citizens of the freely associated states (Marshall Islands, Micronesia and Palau)
  - Nationals of certain neighboring jurisdictions (Canada and Bermuda generally; Bahamas, British Virgin Islands, Cayman Islands and Turks and Caicos Islands under certain conditions; and Mexico under limited categories)
  - Nationals of countries in the Visa Waiver Program who possess a valid ESTA (or of certain additional countries only for Guam and the Northern Mariana Islands)
- U.S. permanent resident card (Form I-551) or temporary I-551 stamp
- U.S. travel document serving as a re-entry permit (Form I-327) or refugee travel document (Form I-571)
- U.S. advance parole authorization (Form I-512), temporary protected status document (Form I-512T), or employment authorization document (Form I-766) annotated "valid for re-entry to U.S." or "serves as I-512 advance parole"
- U.S. military or NATO identification with official travel order
- U.S. merchant mariner credential indicating U.S. citizenship
- NEXUS card indicating U.S. or Canadian citizenship (only to or from Canadian airports with preclearance)
- U.S. government-issued transportation letter or boarding foil (for entry only)
- Foreign emergency travel document or U.S. removal order (for departure only)

For entry by land or sea from the Americas, individuals must present one of the documents acceptable for entry by air or one of the following:

- U.S. passport card
- NEXUS, SENTRI, FAST or Global Entry card indicating U.S. or Canadian citizenship
- U.S. or Canadian enhanced driver's license
- Enhanced tribal card, Native American photo identification card, or Canadian Indian status card
- Border Crossing Card, only for entry from Mexico by land, pleasure vessel or ferry
- U.S. or Canadian birth certificate, U.S. Consular Report of Birth Abroad, U.S. naturalization certificate or Canadian citizenship certificate, only for children under age 16, or under age 19 in a supervised group
- Government-issued photo identification along with U.S. birth certificate, Consular Report of Birth Abroad or naturalization certificate, only for travel by cruise ship returning to the same place of departure in the United States

Children born to a U.S. permanent resident mother during a temporary visit abroad do not need a passport or visa at the mother's first re-entry to the United States within two years after birth. Children born abroad to a parent with a U.S. immigrant visa after its issuance do not need a visa if holding a passport and a birth certificate.

== Visa policy map ==
Visa policy of the United States The United States and its territories Freely associated states (freedom of movement) Visa not required, ESTA not required (6 months) Visa Waiver Program – ESTA (90 days) Visa not required with a police certificate (6 months) Visa required Immigrant visa issuance suspended (with limited exceptions) Immigrant, visitor, student and exchange visa issuance suspended (with limited exceptions) Visa issuance suspended (with limited exceptions) Admission refused This map does not include visa waivers that apply only to certain U.S. territories.

== Visas ==
While there are about 185 different types of U.S. visas, there are two main categories:

- Nonimmigrant visa, for temporary stays such as for tourism, business, family visits, study, work, or transit;
- Immigrant visa: for permanent residence in the United States. At the port of entry, upon endorsement with an I-551 admission stamp, the visa serves as evidence of permanent residence for one year, and the visa holder is processed for a green card. A child with an IR-3 or IH-3 visa automatically becomes a U.S. citizen upon admission and is processed for a certificate of citizenship (N-560).

A U.S. visa does not authorize entry into the United States or a stay in a particular status, but only serves as a preliminary permission to travel to the United States and to seek admission at a port of entry. The final admission to the United States is made at the port of entry by a Customs and Border Protection (CBP) officer. For those entering in a nonimmigrant visa status, the admission details are recorded by the CBP officer on a Form I-94, which serves as the official document authorizing the stay in the United States in a particular status and for a particular period of time. When entering by land, a Form I-94 must be obtained in advance or at the border, and a US$30 fee is charged for its issuance. In order to immigrate, one should either have an immigrant visa or have a dual intent visa, which is one that is compatible with making a concurrent application for nonimmigrant and immigrant status.

Entering the United States on an employment visa may be described as a three-step process in most cases. First, the employer files an application with Citizenship and Immigration Services requesting a particular type of category visa for a specific individual. If the employer's application is approved, it only authorizes the individual to apply for a visa; the approved application is not actually a visa. The individual then applies for a visa and is usually interviewed at a U.S. embassy or consulate in the native country. If the embassy or consulate grants the visa, the individual is then allowed to travel to the United States. At the airport, border crossing or other point of entry, the individual speaks with an officer from the Customs and Border Protection to request admission, and if approved, the individual may then enter the United States.

In addition to immigration sponsored by a U.S. family member or employer, about 55,000 immigrant visas are available each year to natives of certain countries under the Diversity Immigrant Visa program, also known as the green card lottery.

== Visa exemption ==
Summary of visa exemptions
Country or territory	States, DC and Puerto Rico	U.S. Virgin Islands	Guam	Northern Mariana Islands	American Samoa
Marshall Islands	Yes (Note: Indefinite stay and work under Compact of Free Association.)	Yes	Yes	Yes	Online permit
Micronesia	Yes	Yes	Yes	Yes	Online permit
Palau	Yes	Yes	Yes	Yes	Online permit
Canada	Yes	Yes	Yes	Yes	Online permit
Bermuda	Yes	Yes	Yes	Yes	No
Australia	ESTA	ESTA	ESTA/ETA	ESTA/ETA	Online permit
Brunei (Note: For nationals of Brunei, ESTA is valid for 1 year.)	ESTA	ESTA	ESTA/ETA	ESTA/ETA	Online permit
Japan	ESTA	ESTA	ESTA/ETA	ESTA/ETA	Online permit
New Zealand	ESTA	ESTA	ESTA/ETA	ESTA/ETA	Online permit
Singapore	ESTA	ESTA	ESTA/ETA	ESTA/ETA	Online permit
South Korea	ESTA	ESTA	ESTA/ETA	ESTA/ETA	Online permit
Taiwan	ESTA (Note: Only holders of passports containing a national identification number.)	ESTA	ESTA/ETA (Note: Must also hold a national identification card.)	ESTA/ETA	Online permit
United Kingdom	ESTA (Note: Only British citizens are eligible to participate in the VWP.)	ESTA	ESTA/ETA (Note: Holders of a British citizen passport, or a British National (Overseas) passport with a Hong Kong identity card.)	ESTA/ETA	Online permit (Note: British citizens only.)
EU (Note: Except Bulgaria, Cyprus and Romania.) (Note: Only holders of biometric passports are eligible for ESTA. German child passports, which could be requested for children under age 12 as an alternative to a standard German passport before 2024, are not biometric and thus are not eligible for ESTA. The last passports of this kind were set to expire at the end of 2026.) and EFTA	ESTA	ESTA	ESTA	ESTA	Online permit
Andorra	ESTA	ESTA	ESTA	ESTA	Online permit
Chile	ESTA	ESTA	ESTA	ESTA	Online permit
Israel (Note: Only holders of biometric passports issued with full validity, which can only be requested in Israel, are eligible for ESTA. Passports requested at Israeli diplomatic missions abroad, which are not biometric, or for recent immigrants in Israel, which are issued with reduced validity, are not eligible for ESTA.)	ESTA	ESTA	ESTA	ESTA	Online permit
Monaco	ESTA	ESTA	ESTA	ESTA	Online permit
Qatar	ESTA	ESTA	ESTA	ESTA	Online permit
San Marino	ESTA	ESTA	ESTA	ESTA	Online permit
Bahamas	Police certificate (Note: Only if applying for admission at a U.S. preclearance facility located in the Bahamas.)	Police certificate	Police certificate	Police certificate	No
British Virgin Islands	Police certificate (Note: Only if continuing travel after admission in the U.S. Virgin Islands.)	Yes	Police certificate	Police certificate	No
Cayman Islands	Police certificate (Note: Only if arriving directly from the Cayman Islands or the Turks and Caicos Islands.)	Police certificate	Police certificate	Police certificate	No
Turks and Caicos Islands	Police certificate	Police certificate	Police certificate	Police certificate	No
Hong Kong (Note: Holders of a Hong Kong Special Administrative Region passport with a Hong Kong identity card.)	No	No	ETA	ETA	No
Malaysia	No	No	ETA	ETA	No
Nauru	No	No	ETA	ETA	No
Papua New Guinea	No	No	ETA	ETA	No
Samoa	No	No	No	No	Online permit

=== Citizens of freely associated states ===
- Marshall Islands
- Micronesia
- Palau

Under Compacts of Free Association, citizens of the Marshall Islands, Micronesia and Palau may enter, reside, study and work in the United States indefinitely without a visa. These benefits are granted to citizens from birth or independence, and to naturalized citizens who have resided in the respective country for at least five years, excluding those who acquired citizenship by investment.

=== Nationals of neighboring jurisdictions ===
The United States grants visa-free entry to nationals of two neighboring jurisdictions under most circumstances:

- Canada – Citizens of Canada do not need a visa to visit the United States under most circumstances. In addition, under the USMCA (and previously the NAFTA), they may obtain authorization to work under a simplified procedure.
- Bermuda – British Overseas Territories citizens of Bermuda do not need a visa to visit the United States under most circumstances for up to 180 days. They may also enter to study there without a visa. To qualify for the visa exemption, they must present a British passport with "Government of Bermuda" on the cover, with the nationality listed as "British Overseas Territories Citizen" or "British Dependent Territories Citizen", and containing an endorsement stamp of "Holder is registered as a Bermudian", "Holder possesses Bermudian status" or "Holder is deemed to possess Bermudian status".

The United States also grants visa-free entry to nationals of some other neighboring jurisdictions under certain conditions:

- Bahamas – Nationals of the Bahamas do not need a visa to the United States if they apply for admission at a U.S. preclearance facility located in the Bahamas. In addition to a Bahamian passport, applicants 14 years of age or older must present a police certificate issued by the Royal Bahamas Police Force in the previous six months indicating no criminal record.
- British Virgin Islands – British Overseas Territories citizens of the British Virgin Islands may travel without a visa to the U.S. Virgin Islands with their British Virgin Islands passport. They may also continue travel to other parts of the United States if they present a Certificate of Good Conduct issued by the Royal Virgin Islands Police Force indicating no criminal record.
- Cayman Islands – British Overseas Territories citizens of the Cayman Islands may travel without a visa to the United States. To qualify, they must receive a visa waiver from the Cayman Islands Passport and Corporate Services Office, for which they must present a Cayman Islands passport valid for at least six months beyond their intended departure from the United States, a fee of 25 Cayman Islands dollars, and a police clearance certificate for applicants age 13 or older. The visa waiver is valid for only one entry and for travel directly from the Cayman Islands to the United States.
- Turks and Caicos Islands – British Overseas Territories citizens of the Turks and Caicos Islands may travel to the United States without a visa for short stays for business or pleasure. To qualify, they must travel directly from the territory to the United States, present a Turks and Caicos Islands passport or another travel document stating that they are British Overseas Territory citizens with the right of abode in the Turks and Caicos Islands, and applicants 14 years of age or older must also present a police certificate issued by the Royal Turks and Caicos Islands Police Force in the previous six months indicating no criminal record.

Visa-free entry is also granted to limited categories of nationals of another neighboring country:

- Mexico – Some nationals of Mexico do not need a visa to travel to the United States: government officials not permanently assigned to the United States and their accompanying family members, holding diplomatic or official passports, for stays of up to 6 months; members of the Kickapoo tribes of Texas or Oklahoma, holding Form I-872, American Indian Card; and crew members of Mexican airlines operating in the United States. Other nationals of Mexico may travel to the United States with a Border Crossing Card, which functions as a visa and has similar requirements. Under the USMCA (and earlier NAFTA), they may also obtain authorization to work under a simplified procedure.

=== Visa Waiver Program ===
As of 2026, 42 countries (Note: According to the Taiwan Relations Act, U.S. laws treat Taiwan as a country despite the absence of diplomatic recognition.) have been selected by the U.S. government for inclusion in the Visa Waiver Program (VWP). Their nationals do not need a U.S. visa for short stays, but they are required to obtain an Electronic System for Travel Authorization (ESTA) prior to arrival. Visitors may stay for up to 90 days in the United States, which also includes time spent in Canada, Mexico, Bermuda or the islands in the Caribbean if the arrival was through the United States. Nationals of the following countries can only apply for an ESTA if they hold a biometric passport:

Program countries:
- European Union member states (except Bulgaria, Cyprus and Romania)
- All European Free Trade Association member states
- Andorra
- Australia
- Brunei
- Chile
- Israel
- Japan
- Monaco
- New Zealand
- Qatar
- San Marino
- Singapore
- South Korea
- Taiwan (Note: Only holders of passports with a national identification number.)
- United Kingdom

The Electronic System for Travel Authorization (ESTA) is not considered a visa, but a prerequisite to traveling to the United States under the Visa Waiver Program. ESTA has an application fee of US$10.62, and if approved, an additional fee of $30 is charged, for a total of $40.62. Once obtained, the authorization is valid for up to two years or until the traveler's passport expires, whichever comes first, and is valid for multiple entries into the United States. Passengers are advised to apply for ESTA at least 72 hours before departure.

Travel by air or sea with ESTA must be made on a participating commercial carrier. The VWP does not apply at all if arriving by air or sea on an unapproved carrier (e.g. a private ship or plane), in which case a standard visa is required. ESTA is also required for entry by land.

When entering the United States by land, travelers must, apart from their ESTA, also have an I-94 (Arrival/Departure Record) as their official record of admission and authorized stay. Unlike air or sea travel, where the I-94 is created automatically, land travelers must usually apply for the I-94, either at the border or in advance online using the official CBP website. The I-94 costs an additional $30.

As of 2026, those who have previously been in Iran, Iraq, Libya, North Korea, Somalia, Sudan, Syria or Yemen on or after March 1, 2011, or in Cuba on or after January 12, 2021, or who are dual nationals of Cuba, Iran, Iraq, North Korea, Sudan or Syria, are not eligible to travel under the VWP and must obtain a standard visa. However, those who traveled to such countries for diplomatic, military, humanitarian, reporting or legitimate business purposes may have this ineligibility waived.

=== Visa waiver program of Guam and the Northern Mariana Islands ===
Although the visa policy of the United States also applies to the U.S. territories of Guam and the Northern Mariana Islands, both territories have an additional visa waiver program for certain nationalities. The Guam–CNMI Visa Waiver Program, first enacted in October 1988 and periodically amended, permits nationals of 12 countries to visit Guam and the Northern Mariana Islands for up to 45 days, for tourism or business, without the need to obtain a U.S. visa.

Program countries:
- Australia
- Brunei
- Hong Kong
- Japan
- Malaysia
- Nauru
- New Zealand
- Papua New Guinea
- Singapore
- South Korea
- Taiwan (Note: Must travel on a nonstop flight from Taiwan and hold a valid Taiwanese passport and national identification card.)
- United Kingdom

Travelers with a visa or ESTA are admitted to the territories in accordance with the terms of the visa or ESTA.

Travelers using the Guam–CNMI Visa Waiver Program are required to obtain a Guam–CNMI Electronic Travel Authorization (G-CNMI ETA), similar to ESTA. This authorization is valid for up to two years, or until the traveler's passport expires (six months before the passport expires, for nationals of Brunei and Nauru), whichever comes first, and it is valid for multiple entries during this period. This authorization does not require a fee.

Travelers using this program must also hold a machine-readable passport and nonrefundable return ticket, and are not permitted to travel to other parts of the United States. Because of work visas specific to the Northern Mariana Islands, traveling between Guam and the Northern Mariana Islands still requires a full immigration inspection, and all visitors departing Guam or Northern Mariana Islands are inspected regardless of final destination.

=== American Samoa ===
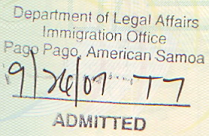
American Samoa entry stamp

U.S. visa policy does not apply to the territory of American Samoa, as it has its own entry requirements and maintains control of its own borders. If required, a visitor permit must be obtained from the American Samoa Department of Legal Affairs.

To travel to American Samoa, U.S. nationals must present a valid U.S. passport or travel document, or a certified birth certificate in combination with a valid identification card. Alternatively, they may apply online for an electronic authorization providing a copy of their birth certificate or expired travel document, a copy of their identification card, itinerary, and a fee of US$50 for verification of vital records.

In addition to their identification document or electronic authorization, U.S. nationals must also show proof of residence or employment in American Samoa or a ticket for future departure from the territory. However, after entering American Samoa, U.S. nationals may reside there indefinitely and cannot be deported.

Holders of a valid U.S. visa or green card, nationals of Canada, Marshall Islands, Micronesia, Palau and countries in the U.S. Visa Waiver Program may apply online for a visitor permit for a stay of up to 30 days, at least 3 business days before travel, providing a copy of their passport valid for at least 6 months after their planned departure from the territory, a ticket for such departure, proof of accommodation, and a fee of $40. Cruise ship passengers do not need a visitor permit.

Nationals of Samoa may apply online for a visitor permit for a stay of up to 10 days, for a fee of $10.

Online visitor permits of American Samoa:
- European Union member states (except Bulgaria, Cyprus and Romania)
- All European Free Trade Association member states
- Andorra
- Australia
- Brunei
- Canada
- Chile
- Israel
- Japan
- Marshall Islands
- Micronesia
- Monaco
- New Zealand
- Palau
- Qatar
- Samoa (Note: For stays of up to 10 days.)
- San Marino
- Singapore
- South Korea
- Taiwan
- United Kingdom

Other visitors need to obtain a visitor permit through a local sponsor, who must appear in person at the Immigration Office of the Department of Legal Affairs. The application must be signed by the sponsor's family matai (chief) and pulenuʻu (village mayor), unless the sponsor provides a deed or lease of private land.

Applicants must also provide a copy of their passport or identity document valid for at least six months after their planned departure from the territory, a ticket for such departure, a police clearance from the country of origin, and a fee of US$40. Minors traveling without a parent must also provide a notarized consent from their parent or guardian and their birth certificate.

The application must be made at least three business days before travel, and the permit is valid for a stay of up to 30 days, but an extension may be requested for a fee of $50.

=== Alaska ===
Residents of the Chukotka Autonomous Okrug in Russia who are members of the indigenous population do not need a visa to visit Alaska if they have relatives (blood relatives, members of the same tribe, native people who have similar language and cultural heritage) in Alaska. Entry points are in Gambell and Nome. Individuals must be invited by a relative in Alaska, must notify local authorities at least ten days before traveling to Alaska, and must leave Alaska within 90 days.

The agreement establishing this policy was signed by Russia (then the Soviet Union) and the United States on September 23, 1989. The United States made it effective as of July 17, 2015.

=== American Indians born in Canada ===
Members of certain indigenous peoples born in Canada may enter and remain in the United States indefinitely "for the purpose of employment, study, retirement, investing, and/or immigration" or any other reason by virtue of the Jay Treaty of 1794, as codified in Section 289 of the Immigration and Naturalization Act.

In order to qualify, an individual must possess "at least 50 per centum blood of the American Indian Race". Tribal membership alone does not qualify an individual. The individual bears the burden of proof in establishing eligibility, typically by way of presenting identification based on reliable tribal records, birth certificates, and other documents establishing the percentage of indigenous ancestry. A Canadian Certificate of Indian Status is insufficient proof because it does not indicate the percentage of indigenous ancestry.

This provision does not extend to family members unless they qualify in their own right. However, qualifying American Indians residing in the United States are considered to be lawfully admitted for U.S. permanent residence and therefore may file a petition for their spouse and dependent children, subject to statutory numerical limitations and a potential backlog of applications.

== Restricted visa issuance or entry ==
=== Sanctions ===
The United States has suspended the issuance of certain types of visas for certain people from certain countries as sanctions for their lack of cooperation in accepting the return of their nationals deported from the United States. In April 2025, these sanctions were applied to all visas of all nationals of South Sudan.

The United States has also prohibited visas for certain people as sanctions for many other reasons, such as government officials allegedly violating human rights or undermining democracy.

=== Security concerns ===
On June 4, 2025, President Donald Trump issued a proclamation suspending the issuance of visas for nationals of several countries, effective June 9, 2025, due to insufficient sharing of information for their security screening. On December 16, 2025, another proclamation modified some of the previous restrictions and added other countries, effective January 1, 2026.

With limited exceptions, the proclamation suspends the issuance of new visas for nationals of the following countries:

- Afghanistan
- Burkina Faso
- Chad
- Congo
- Equatorial Guinea
- Eritrea
- Haiti
- Iran
- Laos
- Libya
- Mali
- Myanmar
- Niger
- Palestine
- Sierra Leone
- Somalia
- South Sudan
- Sudan
- Syria
- Yemen

With limited exceptions, the proclamation suspends the issuance of new immigrant, visitor (B), student (F, M) and exchange (J) visas for nationals of the following countries:

- Angola
- Antigua and Barbuda
- Benin
- Burundi
- Cuba
- Dominica
- Gabon
- Gambia
- Ivory Coast
- Malawi
- Mauritania
- Nigeria
- Senegal
- Tanzania
- Togo
- Tonga
- Venezuela
- Zambia
- Zimbabwe

With limited exceptions, the proclamation suspends the issuance of new immigrant visas for nationals of Turkmenistan.

Exceptions include people already in the United States or holding valid U.S. visas on the effective date of the proclamation; U.S. permanent residents; dual nationals of a country not included in the proclamation; non-immigrant visas for government officials and their family members (A, C, G, NATO); athletes, their supporting staff and family members traveling for major sporting events; Special Immigrant Visas for people who worked for the U.S. government; immigrant visas for persecuted minorities in Iran; witnesses in criminal proceedings; and national interest cases.

=== Outlying islands ===
Visits to the United States Minor Outlying Islands – Baker Island, Howland Island, Jarvis Island, Johnston Atoll, Kingman Reef, Midway Atoll, Navassa Island, Palmyra Atoll and Wake Island – are severely restricted. The islands are not accessible to the general public, and all visits require special permits from the U.S. Fish and Wildlife Service, or from The Nature Conservancy for Palmyra Atoll, or from the U.S. Air Force for Johnston Atoll and Wake Island.

== Qualification process ==
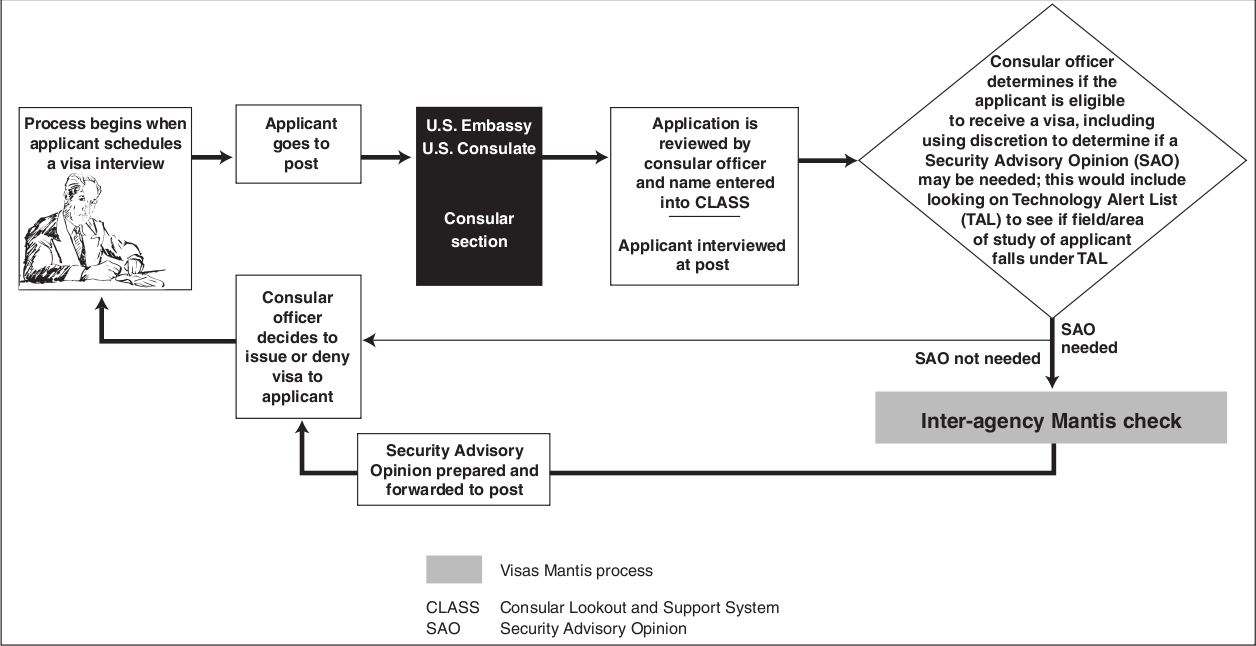
The typical process for issuing a United States visa, possibly including a Visas Mantis check

Applicants for visitor visas must show that they qualify under provisions of the Immigration and Nationality Act. The presumption in the law is that every nonimmigrant visa applicant (except certain employment-related applicants, who are exempt) is an intending immigrant unless otherwise proven. Therefore, applicants for most nonimmigrant visas must overcome this presumption by demonstrating that:

- The purpose of their trip is to enter the U.S. for a specific, intended purpose;
- They plan to remain for a specific, limited period; and
- They have a residence outside the U.S. as well as other binding ties which will ensure their return at the end of their stay.

All visit, business, transit, student, and exchange visitor visa applicants must pay an application fee of US$185 to the consular section at a U.S. embassy or consulate in order to be interviewed by a consular officer who will determine if the applicant is qualified to receive a visa to travel to the United States (additionally, the officer may also ask the United States Department of State for a Security Advisory Opinion, which can take several weeks to resolve). The application fee is increased to $205 for most work visas and can be even higher for certain categories.

Amongst the items included in the qualification decision are financial independence, adequate employment, material assets, and lack of a criminal record and other security risks. If the applicant is rejected, the application fee is not refunded. If the application is approved, nationals of certain countries must also pay a visa issuance fee, based on reciprocity.

The One Big Beautiful Bill Act, enacted in July 2025, would require nonimmigrants to pay a $250 "visa integrity fee", which would be refunded after the expiration of the visa if the person has complied with its conditions.

=== Visa bonds ===
In August 2026, the Department of State finalized a previously established 12-month pilot program to test the feasibility of a visa bond system (with amounts of $5,000, $10,000, or $15,000 depending on the applicants circumstances) for B-1/B-2 visitor visa applicants from countries whose nationals have high overstay rates; where screening and vetting information is deemed insufficient causing the Department to have difficulty obtaining full background and criminal history information; or that offer citizenship by investment programs whereby the applicant obtained citizenship with no residency requirement. In August 2026, the program became permanent, and the bond amounts were increased to $10,000, $15,000, and $20,000, to be periodically adjusted with inflation.

Nationals of the following countries are required to post a bond before receiving a B-1/B-2 visa:

- Algeria (Note: From January 21, 2026)
- Angola
- Antigua and Barbuda
- Bangladesh
- Benin
- Bhutan (Note: From January 1, 2026)
- Botswana
- Burundi
- Cape Verde
- Cambodia (Note: From April 2, 2026)
- Central African Republic
- Cuba
- Djibouti
- Dominica
- Ethiopia
- Fiji
- Gabon
- Gambia (Note: From October 11, 2025)
- Georgia
- Grenada
- Guinea
- Guinea-Bissau
- Ivory Coast
- Kyrgyzstan
- Lesotho
- Malawi (Note: From August 20, 2025)
- Mauritania (Note: From October 23, 2025)
- Mauritius
- Mongolia
- Mozambique
- Namibia
- Nepal
- Nicaragua
- Nigeria
- Papua New Guinea
- São Tomé and Príncipe
- Senegal
- Seychelles
- Tajikistan
- Tanzania
- Togo
- Tonga
- Tunisia
- Turkmenistan
- Tuvalu
- Uganda
- Vanuatu
- Venezuela
- Zambia
- Zimbabwe

All visa holders who have posted a visa bond must enter and exit the United States through ports of entry designated by the Department of State. Compliance with the terms of the visa bond will result in its cancellation and the automatic return of the money if the visa holder's departure from the United States is recorded on or before the date to which they are authorized to stay in the United States; if the visa holder does not travel to the United States before the expiration of the visa; or if the visa holder is denied entry at arrival. Failure to comply with the terms of the bond will result in the forfeiture of the bond deposit.

== Admission statistics ==
United States Number of non-immigrant admissions for tourist and business purposes into the United States in fiscal year 2025: Over 2 million Over 1 million Over 500 thousand Over 250 thousand Over 100 thousand Over 15 thousand Under 15 thousand No admissions

The highest number of non-immigrant admissions for tourists and for business purposes into the United States in fiscal years 2022-2025 was from the following countries (listed over 700,000 admissions):

Admissions to the United States
Country	FY 2025	FY 2024	FY 2023	FY 2022
Canada	▼16,018,525	▼20,241,121	▲20,514,314	▲14,382,227
Mexico	▲17,980,030	▲16,896,495	▲14,367,064	▲12,435,501
United Kingdom	▲4,058,124	▲4,037,119	▲3,897,534	▲3,466,107
India	▼2,060,726	▲2,190,345	▲1,762,369	▲1,256,915
Germany	▼1,770,112	▲1,994,786	▲1,838,481	▲1,481,008
Brazil	▲1,916,565	▲1,910,256	▲1,624,719	▲1,224,974
Japan	▲1,967,298	▲1,843,879	▲1,518,522	▲597,330
France	▼1,589,676	▲1,706,081	▲1,592,934	▲1,317,882
South Korea	▼1,647,142	▲1,700,123	▲1,600,400	▲919,796
China	▼1,562,458	▲1,625,960	▲1,078,056	▲368,111
Italy	▲1,182,877	▲1,123,844	▲976,952	▲717,593
Colombia	▲1,119,998	▲1,068,997	▼932,060	▼943,819
Australia	▼958,574	▲1,025,011	▲954,481	▲641,772
Spain	▲910,525	▲897,336	▲825,790	▲773,421
Argentina	▲789,942	▲687,444	▲596,155	▲524,841
Total (worldwide)	▼68,287,793	▲72,296,865	▲66,481,888	▲50,770,685

Admissions to Guam
Country	FY 2017	FY 2016	FY 2015	FY 2014	FY 2013
South Korea	746,987	685,228	544,957	427,900	308,037
Japan	563,220	620,376	745,680	773,019	810,856
United States	93,244	77,077	77,706	70,246	55,192
Taiwan	27,880	32,505	42,229	42,205	49,136
Northern Mariana Islands	20,563	19,325	17,579	14,334	14,761
Philippines	19,091	19,132	21,652	12,427	12,079
China	16,267	21,954	27,013	23,698	16,280
Total	1,552,177	1,545,392	1,535,518	1,409,050	1,343,092

Admissions to the Northern Mariana Islands
Country	FY 2017	FY 2016	FY 2015	FY 2014
South Korea	▲333,069	▲200,875	▲182,622	▲142,081
China	▲229,389	▲206,538	▲186,509	▲170,121
Japan	▼52,227	▼62,120	▼80,832	▼109,793
Guam	▲16,018	▼13,932	19,968	▲11,879
United States	▲8,528	▼8,516	19,968	▲8,566
Hong Kong	▲4,746	▼1,710	▲732	▲1,098
Russia	▲2,130	▲1,796	▼1,374	▼11,200
Taiwan	▲1,053	▼717	0	0
Philippines	▼969	▼999	▲2,405	▲694
Total	▲653,150	▲501,469	▲478,592	▲459,240

Admissions to American Samoa
Country	FY 2018	FY 2017	FY 2016	FY 2015	FY 2014
Samoa	23,723	22,954	22,371	21,251	20,786
United States	18,324	16,959	17,560	17,053	14,487
New Zealand	4,174	3,825	3,660	3,580	3,589
Philippines	1,095	970	1,148	1,016	966
Australia	1,035	930	974	860	978
Fiji	615	704	644	639	615
China	674	669	861	832	758
Tonga	747	595	707		
Total	76,002	71,952	50,159	48,197	45,326

== Classes of visas ==
All U.S. visa types and subtypes are listed below:

=== Immigrant visas ===
The Trump administration issued new rules on August 12, 2019, that will reject applicants for temporary or permanent visas for failing to meet income standards or for receiving public assistance such as welfare, food stamps, public housing or Medicaid.

Critics feared the new law, which was set to go into effect in October 2019, could negatively impact the lives of children who are U.S. citizens.

Symbol	Description
Immediate Relatives
IR-1	Spouse of U.S. citizen
IR-2	Child of U.S. citizen
IR-3	Orphan from a non-Hague country (i.e., not a party to the Hague Adoption Convention) adopted abroad by U.S. citizen
IR-4	Orphan from a non-Hague country to be adopted in the United States by U.S. citizen
IR-5	Parent of U.S. citizen at least 21 years of age
IH-3	Orphan from a Hague country adopted abroad by U.S. citizen
IH-4	Orphan from a Hague country to be adopted in the United States by U.S. citizen
CR-1	Spouse of U.S. citizen (conditional status)
CR-2	Child of U.S. citizen (conditional status)
IW-1	Certain spouses of deceased U.S. citizens
IW-2	Child of IW-1 IB-1
IB-1	Self-petition spouse of U.S. citizen
IB-2	Self-petition child of U.S. citizen
IB-3	Child of IB-1
VI-5	Parent of U.S. citizen who acquired permanent resident status under the Virgin Islands Nonimmigrant Alien Adjustment Act
Vietnam Amerasian Immigrants
AM-1	Vietnam Amerasian principal
AM-2	Spouse/Child of AM-1
AM-3	Natural mother of AM-1 (and spouse or child of such mother), or person who has acted in effect as the mother, father, or next-of-kin of AM-1 (and spouse or child of such person)
Special Immigrants
SB-1	Returning resident
SC-1	Certain persons who lost U.S. citizenship by marriage
SC-2	Certain persons who lost U.S. citizenship by serving in foreign armed forces
Family-Sponsored Immigrants: First Preference
F11	Unmarried son or daughter of U.S. citizen
F12	Child of F11
B11	Self-petition unmarried son or daughter of U.S. citizen
B12	Child of B11
Family-Sponsored Immigrants: Second Preference (Subject to Country Limitations)
F21	Spouse of permanent resident
F22	Child of permanent resident
F23	Child of F21 or F22
F24	Unmarried son/daughter of permanent resident
F25	Child of F24
B21	Self-petition spouse of permanent resident
B22	Self-petition child of permanent resident
B23	Child of B21 or B22
B24	Self-petition unmarried son/daughter of permanent resident
B25	Child of B24
Family-Sponsored Immigrants: Second Preference (Exempt from Country Limitations)
FX1	Spouse of permanent resident
FX2	Child of permanent resident
FX3	Child of FX1 or FX2
BX1	Self-petition spouse of permanent resident
BX2	Self-petition child of permanent resident
BX3	Child of BX1 or BX2
Family-Sponsored Immigrants: Third Preference
F31	Married son or daughter of U.S. citizen
F32	Spouse of F31
F33	Child of F31
B31	Self-petition married son or daughter of U.S. citizen
B32	Spouse of B31
B33	Child of B31
Family-Sponsored Immigrants: Fourth Preference
F41	Brother or sister of U.S. citizen who is at least 21 years of age
F42	Spouse of F41
F43	Child of F41
Employment-Based Immigrants: First Preference (Priority Workers)
E11	Person with extraordinary ability in the sciences, arts, education, business, or athletics
E12	Outstanding professor or researcher
E13	Multinational executive or manager
E14	Spouse of E11, E12, or E13
E15	Child of E11, E12, or E13
Employment-Based Immigrants: Second Preference (Professionals Holding Advanced Degrees or Persons of Exceptional Ability)
E21	Professional holding advanced degree or person of exceptional ability in the sciences, arts, or business
E22	Spouse of E21
E23	Child of E21
Employment-Based Immigrants: Third Preference (Skilled Workers, Professionals, and Other Workers)
E31	Skilled worker
E32	Professional holding baccalaureate degree
E34	Spouse of E31 or E32
E35	Child of E31 or E32
EW3	Other workers
EW4	Spouse of EW3
EW5	Child of EW3
Employment-Based Immigrants: Fourth Preference (Certain Special Immigrants)
BC-1	Certain international broadcasters
BC-2	Spouse of BC-1
BC-3	Child of BC-1
SD-1	Minister of religion
SD-2	Spouse of SD-1
SD-3	Child of SD-1
SE-1	Certain employees or former employees of the U.S. Government abroad
SE-2	Spouse of SE-1
SE-3	Child of SE-1
SF-1	Certain former employees of the Panama Canal Company or Canal Zone Government
SF-2	Spouse or child of SF-1
SG-1	Certain former employees of the U.S. Government in the Panama Canal Zone SG-2
SH-2	Spouse or child of SH-1
SJ-2	Spouse or child of SJ-1 (certain foreign medical graduates)
SK-1	Certain retired international organization employees
SK-2	Spouse of SK-1 SK-3
SK-4	Certain surviving spouses of deceased international organization employees SL-1
SM-1	Person recruited outside the United States who has served, or is enlisted to serve, in the U.S. Armed Forces for 12 years (became eligible after October 1, 1991)
SM-2	Spouse of SM-1
SM-3	Child of SM-1
SM-4	Person recruited outside the United States who has served, or is enlisted to serve, in the U.S. Armed Forces for 12 years (eligible as of October 1, 1991)
SM-5	Spouse or child of SM-4
SN-1	Certain retired NATO-6 civilian employees
SN-2	Spouse of SN-1
SN-3	Certain unmarried sons or daughters of NATO-6 civilian employees
SN-4	Certain surviving spouses of deceased NATO-6 civilian employees
SR-1	Certain religious workers (subgroup numerical limit)
SR-2	Spouse of SR-1
SR-3	Child of SR-1
Employment-Based Immigrants: Fifth Preference (Employment Creation – Investors) (Conditional Status)
C51	Employment creation outside targeted area
C52	Spouse of C51
C53	Child of C51
T51	Employment creation in targeted rural/high unemployment area (subgroup numerical set-aside)
T52	Spouse of T51
T53	Child of T51
R51	Investor pilot program, not in targeted area
R52	Spouse of R51
R53	Child of R51
I51	Investor pilot program, in targeted area
I52	Spouse of I51
I53	Child of I51
Other Numerically Limited Categories: Diversity Immigrants
DV-1	Diversity immigrant
DV-2	Spouse of DV-1
DV-3	Child of DV-1

=== Nonimmigrant visas ===
Symbol	Description
A-1	Head of state and immediate family, prime minister and immediate family, government minister, ambassador, career diplomat or consular officer, or immediate family
A-2	Minister of state, other foreign government official or employee, or immediate family
A-3	Attendant, servant, or personal employee of A-1 or A-2, and immediate family
B-1	Temporary visitor for business, domestic employees, academics, researchers and students
B-2	Temporary visitor for holiday, tourism, medical treatment
B1/B2	Temporary visitor for business & pleasure
C-1	Person in transit
C-1/D	Combined Transit and Crewmember (sea or air)
C-2	Person in transit to United Nations Headquarters district under Section 11 (3), (4), or (5) of the Headquarters Agreement
C-3	Foreign government official, immediate family, attendant, servant or personal employee, in transit
CW-1	Commonwealth of Northern Mariana Islands transitional worker
CW-2	Spouse or child of Commonwealth of Northern Mariana Islands transitional worker
D	Crewmember (sea or air)
E-1 (Note: Persons with H-1B visas, H-4 visas (as immediate family members of H-1B visa holders), K visas, L visas, and V visas are permitted to have dual intent under the Immigration and Nationality Act. Federal regulations also appear to recognize dual intent O visas, P visas, and E visas.)	Treaty trader, spouse and children
E-2	Treaty investor, spouse and children
E-2C	Commonwealth of Northern Mariana Islands investor, spouse, or child
E-3	Treaty traders and investors: Australian Free Trade Agreement
E-3D	Spouse or child of E-3
E-3R	Returning E-3
F-1	Student (academic or language training program)
F-2	Spouse or child of F-1
F-3	Canadian or Mexican national commuter student in an academic or language training program
G-1	Principal resident representative of recognized foreign member government to international organization, staff, and immediate family
G-2	Other representative of recognized foreign member government to international organization, and immediate family
G-3	Representative of non-recognized or nonmember foreign government to international organization, and immediate family
G-4	International organization officer or employee, and immediate family
G-5	Attendant, servant, or personal employee of G-1 through G-4, and immediate family
GB	Temporary visitors: for business, visa waiver, Guam
GT	Temporary visitors: for pleasure, visa waiver, Guam
H-1B	Alien in a specialty occupation (profession)
H1B1	Chilean or Singaporean national to work in a specialty occupation
H-1C	Nurse in health professional shortage area (discontinued)
H-2A	Temporary worker performing agricultural services unavailable in the United States
H-2B	Temporary worker performing other services unavailable in the United States
H-3	Temporary workers and trainees: industrial trainees
H-4	Temporary workers and trainees: spouses and children of H-1B, H-1B1, H-2A, H-2B, or H-3
I	Representative of foreign information media, spouse and children
J-1	Exchange visitor
J-2	Spouse or child of exchange visitor
K-1	Fiancé(e) of U.S. citizen
K-2	Child of fiancé(e) of U.S. citizen
K-3	Spouse of U.S. citizen awaiting availability of immigrant visa
K-4	Child of K-3
L-1	Intracompany transferee (executive, managerial, and specialized personnel continuing employment with international firm or corporation)
L-2	Spouse or child of intracompany transferee
M-1	Vocational student or other nonacademic student
M-2	Spouse or child of M-1
M-3	Border commuter student (vocational or nonacademic)
N-8	Parent of SK-3 or SN-3 special immigrant
N-9	Child of N-8 or of SK-1, SK-2, SK-4, SN-1, SN-2, or SN-4 special immigrant
NATO-1	Principal permanent representative of member state to NATO (including any of its subsidiary bodies) resident in the U.S. and resident members of official staff; Secretary General, Assistant Secretaries General, and Executive Secretary of NATO; other permanent NATO officials of similar rank, and members of immediate family
NATO-2	Other representatives of member states to NATO (including any of its subsidiary bodies) including representatives, advisers, and technical experts of delegations, and members of immediate family; dependents of members of a force entering in accordance with the provisions of the NATO Status-of-Forces Agreement or in accordance with provisions of the "Protocol on the Status of International Military Headquarters"; members of such a force if issued visas
NATO-3	Official clerical staff accompanying a representative of member state to NATO (including any of its subsidiary bodies), and members of immediate family
NATO-4	Officials of NATO (other than those classifiable as NATO-1), and members of immediate family
NATO-5	Experts, other than officials classifiable as NATO-4, employed in missions on behalf of NATO, and their dependents
NATO-6	Members of a civilian component accompanying a force entering in accordance with the provisions of the NATO Status-of-Forces Agreement; members of a civilian component attached to or employed by an Allied Headquarters under the "Protocol on the Status of International Military Headquarters" set up pursuant to the North Atlantic Treaty; and their dependents
NATO-7	Attendant, servant, or personal employee of NATO-1 through NATO-6 classes, and immediate family
O-1	Person with extraordinary ability in the sciences, arts, education, business, or athletics
O-2	Person accompanying and assisting in the artistic or athletic performance by O-1
O-3	Spouse or child of O-1 or O-2
P-1	Internationally recognized athlete or member of an internationally recognized entertainment group
P-2	Artist or entertainer in a reciprocal exchange program
P-3	Artist or entertainer in a culturally unique program
P-4	Spouse or child of P-1, P-2, or P-3
Q-1	Participant in an international cultural exchange program
R-1	Person in a religious occupation
R-2	Spouse or child of R-1
S-5	Informant possessing information on criminal activity
S-6	Informant possessing information on terrorism
S-7	Spouse, married or unmarried son or daughter, or parent of S-5 or S-6
SIJS	Special Immigrant Juvenile Status: Qualifying children present in the U.S. who are declared dependents of a juvenile court and who would be harmed if returned to their home country
T-1	Victim of a severe form of trafficking in persons
T-2	Spouse of T-1
T-3	Child of T-1
T-4	Parent of T-1 under 21 years of age
T-5	Under-18 unmarried sibling of T-1
T-6	Adult or minor child of a derivative beneficiary of a T-1
TN	NAFTA professional
TD	Spouse or child of TN
U-1	Victim of criminal activity
U-2	Spouse of U-1
U-3	Child of U-1
U-4	Parent of U-1 under 21 years of age
U-5	Under-18 unmarried sibling of U-1 under 21 at time of filing
V-1	Spouse of lawful permanent resident awaiting availability of immigrant visa
V-2	Child of lawful permanent resident awaiting availability of immigrant visa
V-3	Derivative child of V-1 and V-2
WB	Temporary visitors: visa waiver, business
WT	Temporary visitors: visa waiver, pleasure

==== A visa ====
A visas are issued to representatives of a foreign government traveling to the United States to engage in official activities for that government. A visas are granted to foreign government ambassadors, ministers, diplomats, as well as other foreign government officials or employees traveling on official business (A-1 visa). Certain foreign officials require an A visa regardless of the purpose of their trip.

The A visa is also granted to immediate family members of such foreign government officials, defined as "the principal applicant's spouse and unmarried sons and daughters of any age who are not members of some other household and who will reside regularly in the household of the principal alien" (A-2 Visa) and which "may also include close relatives of the principal alien or spouse who are related by blood, marriage, or adoption who are not members of some other household; who will reside regularly in the household of the principal alien; and who are recognized as dependents by the sending government (A-3 Visa).

==== B visa ====
The most common non-immigrant visa is the multiple-purpose B-1/B-2 visa, also known as the "visa for temporary visitors for business or pleasure." Visa applicants sometimes receive either a B-1 (temporary visitor for business) or a B-2 (temporary visitor for pleasure) visa, if their reason for travel is specific enough that the consular officer does not feel they qualify for combined B-1/B-2 status.

Holders of B visas may also attend short non-credit courses. Nationals of Mexico are eligible for Border Crossing Cards.

From November 29, 2016, all holders of Chinese passports who also hold 10-year B visas are required to enroll in the Electronic Visa Update System (EVUS) before traveling to the United States. This requirement may be extended to other nationalities in the future.

Effective January 24, 2020, B visas are not issued to individuals expected to give birth during their stay, unless they demonstrate that the primary purpose of their visit is not to obtain U.S. citizenship for the child. In addition, B visa applicants seeking medical treatment in the United States must demonstrate their arrangements for the medical treatment and sufficiently establish their ability to pay for it.

==== C visa ====
The C-1 visa is a transit visa issued to individuals who are traveling in "immediate and continuous transit through the United States en-route to another country". The only reason to enter the United States must be for transit purposes.

A subtype C-2 visa is issued to diplomats transiting to and from the Headquarters of the United Nations and is limited to the vicinity of New York City. A subtype C-3 visa is issued to diplomats and their dependents transiting to and from their posted country.

==== D visa ====
D visa is issued to crew members of sea-vessels and international airlines in the United States. This includes commercial airline pilots and flight attendants, captain, engineer, or deckhand of a sea vessel, service staff on a cruise ship and trainees on board a training vessel. Usually a combination of a C-1 visa and D visa is required.

There are two types of D visa: D-1 visa for people departing on the same vessel and D-2 visa for people departing on a different vessel.

==== E visa ====
Treaty Trader (E-1 visa) and Treaty Investor (E-2 visa) visas are issued to citizens of countries that have signed treaties of commerce and navigation with the United States.

They are issued to individuals working in businesses engaged in substantial international trade or to investors (and their employees) who have made a 'substantial investment' in a business in the United States.

The variant visa issued only to citizens of Australia is the E-3 visa (E-3D visa is issued to spouse or child of E-3 visa holder and E-3R to a returning E-3 holder).

==== F visa ====
These visas are issued for foreign students enrolled at accredited U.S. institutions.

F-1 visas are for full-time students, F2 visas are for spouses and children of F-1 visa holders and F-3 visas are for "border commuters" who reside in their country of origin while attending school in the United States. They are managed through SEVIS.

==== G visa ====
G visas are issued to diplomats, government officials, and employees who will work for international organizations in the United States. The international organization must be officially designated as such.

The G-1 visa is issued to permanent mission members; the G-2 visa is issued to representatives of a recognized government traveling temporarily to attend meetings of a designated international organization; the G-3 visa is issued to persons who represent a non-recognized government; the G-4 visa is for those who are taking up an appointment; and the G-5 visa is issued to personal employees or domestic workers of G1–G4 visa holders. G1–G4 visas are also issued to immediate family members of the principal visa holder, if they meet certain criteria.

==== NATO visa ====
Officials who work for the North Atlantic Treaty Organization require a NATO visa.

The NATO-1 visa is issued to permanent representatives of NATO and their staff members. The NATO-2 visa is issued to a representative of a member state to NATO or its subsidiary bodies, an advisor or technical expert of the NATO delegation visiting the United States, a member of the NATO military forces component, or a staff member of the NATO representative. The NATO-3 visa is granted to official clerical staff accompanying a representative of a NATO member state. The NATO-4 visa is issued to a foreign national recognized as a NATO official, while the NATO-5 visa is for a foreign national recognized as a NATO expert. The NATO-6 visa is issued to a member of the civilian component of NATO. All NATO visas are also issued to immediate family members. NATO-7 visas are issued to personal employees or domestic workers of NATO-1 to NATO-6 visa holders.

==== H visa ====
H visas are issued to temporary workers in the United States.

===== Discontinued visa types =====
The discontinued H-1A and H-1C visas existed during periods when the United States experienced a shortage of nurses from 1989. The H-1A classification was created by the Nursing Relief Act of 1989 and ended in 1995.

The H-1C visa was created by the Nursing Relief for Disadvantaged Area Act of 1999 and expired in 2005. Currently nurses must apply for H-1B visas.

===== H-1B visas =====
The H-1B classification is for professional-level jobs that require a minimum of a bachelor's degree in a specific academic field. In addition, the employee must have the degree or the equivalence of such a degree through education and experience.

There is a required wage, which is at least equal to the wage paid by the employer to similarly qualified workers or a prevailing wage for such positions in the geographic regions where the jobs are located.

This visa also covers fashion models of distinguished merit and ability. The H-1B1 visa is the variant issued to citizens of Singapore and Chile.

===== Temporary agricultural workers =====
The H-2A visa allows a foreign national entry into the United States for temporary or seasonal agricultural work for eligible employers under certain conditions (seasonal job, no available U.S. workers).

===== Temporary nonagricultural workers =====
The H-2B visa allows a foreign national entry into the United States for temporary or seasonal non-agricultural work for eligible employers under certain conditions (seasonal job, no available U.S. workers).

===== Nonimmigrant trainee or special education exchange Visitor =====
The H-3 visa is available to those foreign nationals looking to "receive training in any field of endeavor, other than graduate medical education or training, that is not available in the foreign national's home country" or "participate in a special education exchange visitor training program that provides for practical training and experience in the education of children with physical, mental, or emotional disabilities".

===== Family members =====
H-4 visas are issued to immediate family members of H visa holders. In some cases, they are eligible for employment.

==== I visa ====
The I-1 visa is issued to representatives of the foreign media, including members of the press, radio, film, and print industries travelling to temporarily work in the United States in the profession.

==== J visa ====
The J-1 visa is issued to participants of work-and study-based exchange visitor programs.

The Exchange Visitor Program is carried out under the provisions of the Fulbright-Hays Act of 1961, officially known as the Mutual Educational and Cultural Exchange Act of 1961 (Pub. L. 87–256, 75 Stat. 527). The purpose of the act is to increase mutual understanding between the people of the United States and the people of other countries by means of educational and cultural exchanges. The Exchange Visitor Program is administered by the Office of Exchange Coordination and Designation in the Bureau of Educational and Cultural Affairs.

In carrying out the responsibilities of the Exchange Visitor Program, the department designates public and private entities to act as exchange sponsors. Spouses and dependents of J-1 exchange visitors are issued a J-2 visa.

Exchange visa categories are:

- Au pair and EduCare
- Camp counselor
- College and university student
- Government visitor
- Intern
- International visitor
- Physician
- Professor and research scholar
- Secondary school student
- Short-term scholar
- Specialist
- Summer Work Travel Program participant
- Teacher
- Trainee

Exchange Visitor Pilot Programs exist for citizens of Australia, Ireland, New Zealand and South Korea.

==== K visa ====
A K-1 visa is a visa issued to the fiancé or fiancée of a United States citizen to enter the United States. A K-1 visa requires a foreigner to marry his or her U.S. citizen petitioner within 90 days of entry, or depart the United States. Once the couple marries, the foreign citizen can adjust status to become a lawful permanent resident of the United States (Green Card holder).

A K-2 visa is issued to unmarried children under the age of 21. Foreign same-sex partners of United States citizens are currently recognized by United States Citizenship and Immigration Services (USCIS) and accordingly can be sponsored for K-1 visas and for permanent resident status.

K-3/K-4 visas are issued to foreign spouses and children of U.S. citizens.

==== L visa ====
The L-1 classification is for international transferees who have worked for a related organization abroad for at least one continuous year in the past three years and who will be coming to the United States to work in an executive or managerial (L-1A) or specialized knowledge capacity (L-1B). The L-2 visa is issued to dependent spouse and unmarried children under 21 years of age of qualified L-1 visa holders.

==== M visa ====
The M-1 visa is a type of student visa reserved for vocational and technical schools.

Students in M-1 status may not work on or off campus while studying, and they may not change their status to F-1. The M-2 visa permits the spouse and minor children of an M-1 vocational student to accompany him or her to the United States.

==== O visa ====
The O visa is a classification of non-immigrant temporary worker visa granted to an alien "who possesses extraordinary ability in the sciences, arts, education, business, or athletics (O-1A visa), or who has a demonstrated record of extraordinary achievement in the motion picture or television industry and has been recognized nationally or internationally for those achievements," (O-1B visa) and to certain assistants (O-2 visa) and immediate family members of such aliens (O-3 visa).

==== P visa ====
P visas are issued to individuals or team athletes, or member of an entertainment group including persons providing essential support services (P-1 visa), artists or entertainers (individual or group) under a reciprocal exchange program (P-2 visa) and artists or entertainers (individual or group) visiting to perform, teach or coach under a program that is culturally unique (P-3 Visa).

P-4 visas are issued to spouses, or children under the age of 21, of a P-1, P-2, or P-3 alien and who is accompanying, or following to join.

==== Q visa ====
The Q visa is issued to participants in an international cultural exchange program.

==== R visa ====
The R-1 visa is issued to temporary religious workers. They must have been a member of a religious denomination having a bona fide non-profit religious organization in the United States for at least 2 years. R-2 visa is issued to dependent family members.

==== S visa ====
S visas are nonimmigrant visas issued to individuals who have assisted law enforcement as a witness or informant. There is a limit of 200 S visas a year.

A law enforcement agency can then submit an application for resident alien status, i.e. a green card on behalf of the witness or informant once the individual has completed the terms and conditions of his or her S visa.

==== TN visa ====
NAFTA Professional (TN) visa allows citizens of Canada and Mexico whose profession is on the NAFTA list and who must hold a bachelor's degree to work in the United States on a prearranged job. Canadian citizens usually do not need a visa to work under the TN status (unless they live outside Canada with non-Canadian family members) while Mexican citizens require a TN visa.

Spouse and dependent children of a TN professional can be admitted into the United States in the TD status.

==== T and U visas ====
The T-1 visa is issued to victims of severe forms of human trafficking.

Holders may adjust their status to permanent resident status.

Subtypes of this visa are T-2 (issued to spouses of T-1), T-3 (issued to children of T-1), T-4 (issued to parents of T-1 under the age of 21), and T-5 (issued to unmarried siblings under the age of 18 of T-1 who is under 21).

The U-1 visa is a nonimmigrant visa which is set aside for victims of crimes (and their immediate family members) who have suffered substantial mental or physical abuse and are willing to assist law enforcement and government officials in the investigation or prosecution of the criminal activity.

Subtypes of this visa are U-2 issued to spouses of U-1, U-3 issued to children of U-1, U-4 issued to parents of U-1 under the age of 21 and U-5 issued to unmarried siblings under the age of 18 of U-1 who is under 21.

==== V visa ====
The V visa was a temporary visa available to spouses and minor children (unmarried, under 21) of U.S. lawful permanent residents (LPR, also known as green card holders).

It allowed permanent residents to achieve family unity with their spouses and children while the immigration process takes its course. It was created by the Legal Immigration Family Equity Act of 2000.

The Act is to relieve those who applied for immigrant visas on or before December 21, 2000. Practically, the V visa is currently not available to spouses and minor children of LPRs who have applied after December 21, 2000.

=== Dual-intent visas ===
The concept of the dual intent visa is to grant legal status to certain types of visa applicants when they are in the process of applying for a visa with the intent to obtain a permanent residency/green card. Generally, nonimmigrant visas require the applicant to show they plan to return to their home country after their stay.

There are a certain number of U.S. visa categories that grant permission for dual intent, or to get a temporary visa status while having an intention to get a green card and stay permanently in the United States of America.

Symbol	Description
Culture Workers, Artists and Entertainers
P-1	Athletes or members of team who take part in certain athletic competition for the purpose of entertainment
P-2	Entertainers and artists who visit the United States under a mutual exchange program between the U.S. and other organizations and their supporters (service workers or individuals)
P-3	Artists, individuals and service workers who come to the U.S. with the objective to teach, coach, develop and interpret traditional and cultural performances
P-4	Dependents of individuals who hold P-2 and P-3 visas
O-1A	Individuals who have unique talents or outstanding accomplishments in the spheres of education, business, science and mathematics
O-1B	Individuals who have unique talents or outstanding accomplishments in the spheres of education, business, science and mathematics
O-2 (A&B)	Individuals who provide O-1 holders with essential assistance
O-3	Dependents of individuals who hold O-1 and O-2 visas
Athletes
H-1B	Professional athletes, coaches and coaching staff
P-1	Athletes with a high level of international performance and their supporters
O-1A	Individuals with unique talents and abilities in the field of sports
Entrepreneurs and Business Individuals
H-1B	Individuals who have a high level of professional knowledge in a particular niche
L-1	Such qualified employers/intracompany transferees as executives, managers and specialty workers
E-2	Citizens of Treaty Countries who have an intention to invest in an American company
E-3	Australian citizens specializing in certain occupation who intend to start a niche-related business within the U.S.
O-1A	Individuals with outstanding talents and achievements that are internationally recognised
Family Members of LPRs
V	Individuals with family members who have the LPR (Lawful Permanent Resident) status, live in the United States and have filed the Form I-130 before December 21, 2000
Fiancé(e)s and Spouses of United States Citizens
K-1	Foreign fiancé(e)s who are going to enter the United States with an intention to marry an American citizen
K-2	Individuals who are dependents of K-1 visa holders
K-3	Individuals who have already married U.S. citizens abroad and now have a right to enter the U.S.
H-4	Individuals who are dependents of H-1B visa holders. Department of State says that "H-4 spouses and child derivatives of H-1B1, H-2, and H3 applicants are subject to the foreign residence requirement."
Intra-Company Transferees
L-1A	Managers and executives who are transported to an office in the United States in order to carry out certain supervisory duties
L-1B	Individuals who have profound knowledge in company's inner processes, services and systems who are transported to an office in the United States
L-2	Individuals who are dependents of L-1 visa holders
Doctors and Physicians
H-1B	Foreign medical practitioners who have an appropriate degree and a license in their sphere and have completed the FLEX licensing examination
O-1A	Foreign medical practitioners with outstanding skills in the medical niche
E-2	Foreign medical practitioners who have an intention to invest in an American enterprise
Professional and Priority Workers
H-1B	Foreign citizens with a specialty occupation who have a sponsorship from an employer based in the United States
E-2	Treaty investors who are eligible to work in the United States for an American business if they invest more than US$100,000 and if they are citizens of Treaty Countries
E-3	Australian citizens who have a sponsorship from an employer based in the United States
Software Engineers and Programmers
H-1B	Foreign citizens who have deep knowledge in the computer sphere and can provide strong evidence of their skills
L-1	Foreign citizens who hold the position of executive or manager in software companies and have to be transported to a branch based in the United States
E-1/E-2	Foreign citizens from Treaty Countries who possess unique IT skills
O-1A	Foreign citizens who have outstanding knowledge in computer science and software development
Temporary Workers
H-1B	Foreign citizens who are currently/expired nurses by occupation and who are going to come to the United States under the Nursing Relief Act
H-1B	Foreign citizens who specialize in spheres that are important for employers who are based in the United States
H-4	Individuals who are dependents of H-1B visa holders and applicants. Department of State says that "H-4 spouses and child derivatives of H-1B1, H-2, and H3 applicants are subject to the foreign residence requirement."
Treaty Traders and Investors
E-1	Individuals who are officially investors and who are citizens of E-1 Treaty Countries
E-2	Foreign citizens who are going to work or travel and who have made an investment in the United States economy that they can control
Scientists, Professors, Scholars and Researchers
O-1A	Scholars and professors who show outstanding accomplishments in science
O-2 (A&B)	Accompanying individuals of O-1A visa holders or applicants whose help is indispensable to certain scientific researches
O-3	Individuals who are dependents O-1/O-2 visa holders
H-1B	Scientific researchers who will be employed by certain academic institutions in the United States

Most visas are named after the paragraph of the Code of Federal Regulations that established the visa.

== Digital Visa Authorization (DVA) ==
The State Department's Bureau of Consular Affairs began developing and trialling an electronic visa system envisioned to eventually replace traditional sticker visas on passports. In 2023, this was trialled with K-1 visas issued at the Embassy of the United States, Dublin, Ireland.

As this will only apply to individuals requiring a visa, this is different to the established ESTA system for visa-waived nationals.

== Visa denial ==
A mock-up of the letter issued by the United States Consulate-general in Shanghai to inform nonimmigrant visa denials under Section 214(b) of the Immigration and Nationality Act.

Section 221(g) of the Immigration and Nationality Act defined several classes of aliens ineligible to receive visas.

Grounds for denial may include, but are not limited to:

- Risk of visa overstay
- Financial insecurity
- Having low or middle class income
- Having an informal job
- Unemployment
- Not having children and/or being single
- Relatives living in the United States
- Political, economic or social instability in the country of origin
- Incomplete education
- Health grounds
- Criminal history
- Security fears
- Public charge (charge means burden in this context)
- Illegal entrants or immigration violators
- Failure to produce requested documents
- Ineligible for citizenship
- Previously removed from the U.S.
- The spouse of a U.S. Citizen is almost always denied a visitor's (B1/B2) visa on the grounds that the spouse might want to stay in the United States.

Section 214(b) of the Immigration and Nationality Act (also cited as 8 United States Code § 1184(b)) states that most aliens must be presumed to be intending to remain in the U.S., until and unless they are able to show that they are entitled to non-immigrant status. This means there are two sides to a 214(b) denial. Denials occur when applicants do not convince the consular officer of their intent to stay in the U.S. temporarily, or were qualified for the visa.

An example of a denial based upon the first ground would be an applicant for an F-1 student visa who the consular officer felt was secretly intending to remain in the U.S. permanently.

An example of a denial based upon the second ground would be an H-1B applicant who couldn't prove he possessed the equivalent of a U.S. bachelor's degree in a specialty field—such an equivalency being a requirement for obtaining an H-1B visa.

In order to thereafter obtain a visa applicants are recommended to objectively evaluate their situation, see in what way they fell short of the visa requirements, and then reapply.

In rare cases, Section 212(d)(3) of the Immigration and Nationality Act allows for the temporary entry of certain aliens who would otherwise be prohibited from entering the United States.

The person applies for a Hranka waiver and pays the filing fee. When deciding whether to approve the waiver, the Board of Immigration Appeals considers whether there would be harm to society if the applicant were admitted to the United States, the seriousness of the applicant's prior violations, and the nature of the applicant's reasons for wishing to enter the United States.

If approved for a Hranka waiver, the applicant would need to have this documentation when requesting entry to the United States.

== Exceptions ==
There are cases when a U.S. visa has been granted to aliens who were technically ineligible.

Japanese mafia (yakuza) leader Tadamasa Goto and three others were issued visas for travel between 2000 and 2004 to undergo liver transplant surgery at UCLA Medical Center. The FBI had aided the men in the visa application process hoping that they would provide information regarding yakuza activities in the U.S.

In 2005, Indian Prime Minister Narendra Modi (then Chief Minister of Gujarat) was denied a diplomatic visa to the United States. The B-1/B-2 visa that had previously been granted to him was also revoked, under a section of the Immigration and Nationality Act which makes any foreign government official who was responsible or "directly carried out, at any time, particularly severe violations of religious freedom" ineligible for the visa (the violations of religious freedom in question being the 2002 Gujarat riots). Modi is the only person ever denied a visa to the U.S. under this provision. In 2014, after Modi's BJP political party won the 2014 Indian general election, U.S. President Barack Obama ended the visa issue by calling Modi to congratulate him on his victory, and invited him to the White House. On June 8, 2016, Modi addressed a joint meeting of the U.S. Congress.

== See also ==
- Diversity Immigrant Visa
- Electronic System for Travel Authorization
- Real ID Act
- Security Advisory Opinion
- U.S. Citizenship and Immigration Services
- U.S. Customs and Border Protection
- U.S. Department of Homeland Security
- U.S. Immigration and Customs Enforcement
- Visa requirements for United States citizens
- Visa Waiver Program
- Western Hemisphere Travel Initiative
