= List of United States dependent visas =

A dependent United States visa is a type of visa which allows spouses and children to travel to the United States for the purpose of accompanying a family member with a corresponding visa type. While many visa classes have their own dependent visa, others do not. Some of these require all family members to apply for the same visa class, such as E-2 and C-2 visas. Others such as the D-1 visa do not allow travel for dependents at all. Certain restrictions apply depending on the type of dependent visa an individual is seeking.

The dependent visa classes are as follows:

- CW-2 visa - for dependents of those admitted on a CW-1 visa. Children must be under 18 years of age.
- E-3D visa - for dependents of those admitted on an E-3 visa. Spouses may apply for authorization to work while in the US.
- F-2 visa - for dependents of those admitted on an F-1 visa. Employment is not authorized. Children may attend primary and secondary school.
- H-4 visa - for dependents of those admitted under another H visa "Employment Authorization for Certain H-4 Dependent Spouses". USCIS.
- J-2 visa - for dependents of those admitted on a J-1 visa. J-2 dependents may study while in the US and apply for authorization to work
- K-2 visa - for the children of those admitted under a K-1 visa
- K-4 visa - for the children of those admitted under a K-3 visa
- L-2 visa - for dependents of those admitted under an L-1 visa. L-2 spouses may work while in the US. Children may not be employed.
- M-2 visa - for dependents of those admitted under an M-1 visa. Neither spouses nor children may work. Spouses may not study, but children may study at an elementary or secondary school.
- N-9 visa - for children of those admitted under an N-8 visa, SK-1 visa, SK-2 visa, or SK-4 visa.
- O-3 visa - for dependents of those admitted under an O-1 visa or O-2 visa.
- P-4 visa - for dependents of those admitted under P-1, P-2, P-3 visas. Recipients are not permitted to work, but may attend schooling.
- R-2 visa - for dependents of those admitted under an R-1 visa. Recipients are not permitted to work, but may attend schooling.
- S-7 visa - for dependents of those admitted under S-5 or S-6 visas.
- TD visa - for dependents of those admitted under a TN visa. Recipients are not permitted to work, but may attend schooling.
- T-2 visa - for spouses of those admitted under a T-1 visa
- T-3 visa - for children of those admitted under a T-1 visa
- T-4 visa - for parents of those admitted under a T-1 visa
- T-5 visa - for unmarried siblings of those admitted under a T-1 visa
- U-2 visa - for spouses of those admitted under a U-1 visa
- U-3 visa - for children of those admitted under a U-1 visa
- U-4 visa - for parents of those admitted under a U-1 visa
- U-5 visa - for unmarried siblings of those admitted under a U-1 visa
- V-1 visa - for spouses of legal permanent residents
- V-2 visa - for children of legal permanent residents
- V-3 visa - for children of those admitted under V-1 or V-2 visas
