= Dutch–American Friendship Treaty =

1956 agreement between the United States and the Netherlands

The Dutch-American Friendship Treaty (also known as DAFT) is the Treaty of Friendship, Commerce and Navigation between the Kingdom of the Netherlands and the United States of America, signed at The Hague on March 27, 1956, and entering into force on December 5, 1957.

In the context of Dutch immigration policy, U.S. nationals may apply for a residence permit to work on a self-employed basis in the Netherlands by invoking DAFT, subject to requirements published by the Dutch Immigration and Naturalisation Service (IND). The treaty is also relevant to Dutch nationals seeking U.S. E visas: the Netherlands is a treaty country for E-1 (treaty trader) and E-2 (treaty investor) classifications.

== Implications for U.S. entrepreneurs ==
The IND lists requirements for applicants invoking the Dutch-American Friendship Treaty under a residence permit as a self-employed person. These include meeting general requirements, holding U.S. nationality, and falling within one of the treaty situations (such as trade between the Netherlands and the United States, developing and leading business operations in the Netherlands, or investing substantial capital). The IND states that the level of “substantial capital” depends on the form of the business, and that for most forms it requires a minimum investment of €4,500.

Per April 2024, the IND states that first-time treaty-based applicants who do not yet have a Dutch residence permit must register with the Chamber of Commerce and make the required investment within six months after receiving the residence permit; otherwise the IND may revoke the permit.

For extensions based on a treaty, the IND requires annual accounts and a balance sheet or income statement to check whether the company has been active and whether the invested capital remained in the business. The IND states that the self-employed residence permit is valid for a maximum of two years.

Some expatriate-oriented advisory resources publish practical guidance on assembling documentation for DAFT renewals in line with the IND's extension checks.

== Implications for Dutch traders and investors ==
Dutch nationals may qualify for U.S. E-1 (treaty trader) and E-2 (treaty investor) nonimmigrant visas because the Netherlands is a treaty country for these classifications. U.S. State Department guidance describes E-1/E-2 eligibility and notes that these categories can also apply to certain employees (executive, supervisory, or essential skills) of a qualifying enterprise.
