= CW1 =

CW 1 may refer to:

== Astronomy ==
- (5209) 1989 CW1, a Jupiter Trojan minor planet
- (48605) 1995 CW1, a main-belt minor planet
- (65896) 1998 CW1, a main-belt minor planet

== Other uses ==
- CW-1 Junior, a 1930s American a light sports aircraft
- CW1, a postcode district in the CW postcode area in Cheshire, England
- CW-1 visa, a non-immigrant visa which allows travel to the United States for temporary workers to be employed in the Commonwealth of the Northern Mariana Islands
