= NATO-1 visa =

Non-immigrant visa used by NATO representatives

The NATO-1 visa is a non-immigrant visa which allows representatives from NATO member states, their official staff, and their immediate family members (Note: Effective October 1, 2018, the unmarried domestic partner of a government official is no longer eligible for a derivative A-1 or A-2 visa. The only exception is in the case of countries where same-sex marriage is not legally available, but the sending nation accepts accreditation of U.S. same-sex spouses with the same privileges and immunities as opposite-sex spouses.) to travel to the United States. Recipients are normally exempt from inspection, and the visa is valid for the duration of the individual's stay in the US.

Heads of state traveling to the U.S. are ineligible for this visa category, even when on official NATO business, and must apply for an A-1 visa regardless of their purpose of travel. NATO officials and their family members may not utilize the NATO-1 visa if traveling for a purpose other than official business, and must instead apply for the alternate applicable visa category.

== See also ==
- G visa
- Visa policy of the United States § NATO visa
