= Dual intent =

Concept in U.S. immigration and nationality law

Dual intent is a concept in United States immigration law. Typically, it refers to the fact that certain U.S. visas allow foreigners to be temporarily present in the U.S. with lawful status and immigrant intent. This allows those visa holders to enter the U.S. while simultaneously seeking lawful permanent resident status (green card status) at a port of entry. Otherwise, visa holders may be presumed to have immigrant intent and can be kept from entry (summarily excluded) as a matter of law.

== Meaning of "dual" ==
"Dual" refers to

1. the holding of a nonimmigrant visa, and
2. the intention to immigrate.

In contrast, a greencard holder is an immigrant with intent to immigrate, and a H-2B holder has a visa with intent to not immigrate.

== Immigrant intent ==
If immigrant intent is presumed based upon inferences made by consular or Department of Homeland Security's border review, this is grounds for termination of nonimmigrant visas issued, refusal of the visa application, refusal of admission at the port of entry, refusal of readmission, or removal (deportation). Further, if a border or consular official believes that a visa holder is intentionally misrepresenting themself, then the applicant for entry into the U.S. can also be permanently barred for visa fraud. Unless the foreigner holds a dual intent type visa, the foreigner is subject to review for immigrant intent on each visit to the United States.

Certain types of foreign visitors are allowed dual intent, and other categories of visitors are not. Persons with H-1B visas (for specialty workers and their spouses and minor children with H-4 visas), K visas (for fiancees or foreign spouses of US citizens and their minor children), L visas (for corporate transferees and their spouses and minor children), and V visas (spouses and minor children of lawful permanent residents) are permitted to have dual intent under the Immigration and Nationality Act.

Most other foreign visitors and workers, like those on H-2B worker, H-3 trainee/worker, B-1 business, B-2 tourist, Visa Waiver Program visitor, F-1 student, J-1 exchange visitor, M-1 student, journalism, and entertainer visas should not have immigrant intent. Such visa holders can be denied admission if the consular or port official reasonably believes that they have interest in permanently remaining in the United States (i.e., in pursuing a green card). Certain activities may appear likely to lead to U.S. permanent resident status in the belief of an experienced government official.

While similar to the H-1B visa, the H-1B1 visa (for Chilean and Singaporean nationals) is not dual intent.

== 30 to 60 day rule ==
A footnote within the Foreign Affairs Manual has caused some confusion. This footnote is called the 30- to 60-day rule, which relates to the presumption of immigration fraud by consular officials. If a person enters on a non-immigrant visa, such as a B-2 visa, but soon after works without USCIS authorization or marries a U.S. citizen or permanent resident, then a consular official may presume visa fraud and deny all future visa applications. This 30- to 60-day concept has little to do with dual intent. This footnote guides consular officials on the intention of the U.S. government to deter those from entering, who intend to abuse the non-immigrant visa system based upon Immigration and Naturalization Sections 214(b) or 212(a)(6)(C)(i).

Individuals who are married to U.S. citizens are allowed, under some conditions, into the U.S. on tourist visas or visa waivers. Such applicants for entry must demonstrate to the satisfaction of the consular or port official that their trip is temporary; that they are likely to return to their country of citizenship because they have no interest in immigrating for the purposes of the entry in question.

Most visas, including B-1/B-2 visas and visa waivers, do not allow dual intent.

Intent to remain in the United States permanently at time of entry is not the same as a general desire to remain in the United States permanently, which is technically allowable.
