= G visa =

Category of United States visa

The G visa is a category of official visas issued to diplomats, government officials, and international organization employees who are visiting the United States temporarily for a governmental purpose.

G visas may also be issued to immediate family members of the principal visa holder. (Note: Effective October 1, 2018, the unmarried domestic partner of a government official is no longer eligible for a derivative G-1, G-2, G-3, or G-4 visa. There is an exception for G-1, G-2, and G-3 visas in the case of countries where same-sex marriage is not legally available, but the sending nation accepts accreditation of U.S. same-sex spouses with the same privileges and immunities as opposite-sex spouses. There is no such exception for G-4 visas because the individual is sent by an international organization rather than a nation.) G visas are issued by the United States Department of State.

G visas are not issued to heads of state, who are instead granted an A-1 visa.

== Types ==
There are five visas in the G visa category:

G-1
The G-1 visa is for permanent members of a diplomatic mission from a recognized government, who are visiting a specific international organization (and for eligible family members).
G-2
The G-2 visa is for official representatives of a recognized government, who are attending meetings at a specific international organization (and for eligible family members).
G-3
The G-3 visa is for representatives of a government not officially recognized by the United States (and for eligible family members of the principal visa holder).
G-4
The G-4 visa is for persons who have been appointed to a position at an international organization in the United States, including the United Nations (and for eligible family members).
G-5
The G-5 visa is for employees or domestic workers of G-1, G-2, G-3, or G-4 visa holders who meet certain criteria.

== Duration of status ==
An individual is generally allowed to retain G-1, G-2, G-3, or G-4 status for as long as the person is recognized by the U.S. Secretary of State.

== Work authorization ==
G visas give work authorization to the primary holder of the visa. A family member with a G visa is eligible to apply for work authorization and only if the individual is a married spouse, an eligible domestic partner, an unmarried child under age 21, an unmarried child under age 23 who is a full-time student at a college or university, or an unmarried child of any age who is physically disabled or mentally disabled.

== See also ==
- NATO-1 visa
- Travel visa
- Visa policy of the United States
