= J-2 visa =

Non-immigrant United States visa

A J-2 visa is a non-immigrant visa issued by the United States for spouses and dependents of J-1 exchange visitors. Any J-2 visa with the Employment Authorization Document (EAD) can work for any employer in the US without sponsorship. 39.350 J-2 visas were issued in 2017.

== Employment authorization ==
J-2 visitors may request work authorization from United States Citizenship and Immigration Services (USCIS) by submitting form I-765. Adjudication typically takes between 3 and 5 months.

If approved, an Employment Authorization Document (EAD) will be issued, authorizing the J-2 visitor for employment for a period of up to one year. Applications for additional employment authorization may be submitted annually until the end of the J-2's status. However, some J-2 visa holders reported receiving EAD cards valid until the end of their J-2 visa.

== Academic enrollment ==
J-2 visitors may enroll in academic programs as recreational or degree-seeking students. There are no enrollment requirements associated with J-2 status; students may enroll full- or part-time and discontinue their program at any time. J-2 visitors who have not completed their academic program by the time the principal J-1's status ends may petition for a change to F-1 student status, provided they are not subject to the Two-Year Home Residency Requirement.

== See also ==
- List of United States dependent visas
