= TN status =

U.S. visa category for Canadian and Mexican professionals, part of NAFTA

TN status (or TN classification; "TN" from Trade NAFTA) is a special non-immigrant classification of foreign nationals in the United States, which offers expedited work authorization to a citizen of Canada or a national of Mexico. It was created as a result of provisions of the North American Free Trade Agreement that mandated simplified entry and employment permission for certain professionals from each of the three NAFTA member states in the other member states. The provisions of NAFTA relevant to TN status were then carried over almost verbatim to the United States–Mexico–Canada Agreement that replaced NAFTA in 2020.

A Canadian citizen or Mexican national with a job offer from a U.S. employer in certain defined professions and who meets the minimal education requirements for the relevant profession can work in the United States, for up to three years. The classification theoretically may be renewed indefinitely, although real-world complications may limit the number of times, or overall length of time, a foreign national might successfully be granted an authorized period of admission into the United States in the classification.

For Mexican nationals, being granted admission in TN classification generally requires first being issued a TN visa at a U.S. consular post. In contrast, Canadian citizens, who are generally exempt from the usual requirement of U.S. federal regulations to obtain a U.S. visa in advance of requesting admission to the U.S. (with limited exceptions), generally simply present their relevant paperwork directly to a U.S. Customs and Border Protection officer when seeking a new period of authorized admission into the United States in TN status. For both Mexican nationals and Canadian citizens already present in the United States and maintaining lawful immigration status in a classification other than TN, TN classification can also be granted through a "Change of Status" process initiated by a U.S. employer's petition for TN status on behalf of that prospective or current employee.

Canada's corresponding NAFTA work permit for U.S. citizens and Mexican nationals is sometimes unofficially also referred to as a TN status or TN visa, although this name is technically only a creation of U.S. law.

TN classification bears a similarity, in some ways, to the U.S. H-1B classification, but also has unique features. Notably, H-1B classification allows for "dual intent" to obtain Lawful Permanent Resident (LPR) status in the United States, while TN status does not. This leads to a variety of practical considerations for a TN status holder offered a transition to U.S. permanent residence by an employer or U.S. citizen or LPR spouse.

== History ==
=== NAFTA negotiation and ratification ===
The governments of Canada, Mexico, and the United States negotiated a regional free trade agreement, which came to be known as NAFTA, during the 1980s. The leaders of the three nations signed the agreement in their respective capitals on December 17, 1992.

NAFTA included an Appendix 1603.D.1 that required each of the member-states to institute laws and regulations for the free temporary movement of certain professionals among the three member-states with special simplified immigration procedures.

=== United States federal law ===
NAFTA was implemented in U.S. federal law in 1993 through the North American Free Trade Agreement Implementation Act, H.R. 3450, Pub. L. 103-182, 107 Stat. 2057.

After approval of the measure by the U.S. House and U.S. Senate, President Bill Clinton signed the law on December 8, 1993, placing NAFTA into effect on January 1, 1994.

The measure inserted a new sub-paragraph into section 214 of the Immigration and Nationality Act, codified at United States Code, title 8, section 1184, that states:

An alien who is a citizen of Canada or Mexico, and the spouse and children of any such alien if accompanying or following to join such alien, who seeks to enter the United States under and pursuant to the provisions of Section D of Annex 1603 of the North American Free Trade Agreement (in this subsection referred to as 'NAFTA') to engage in business activities at a professional level as provided for in such Annex, may be admitted for such purpose under regulations of the Attorney General promulgated after consultation with the Secretaries of State and Labor, for purposes of this Act, including the issuance of entry documents and the application of subsection (b), such alien shall be treated as if seeking classification, or classifiable, as a nonimmigrant under section 101(a}(15).

In 2020, this wording was updated by the United States-Mexico-Canada Agreement Implementation Act to reflect the new agreement.

=== United States federal regulations ===
The regulations described in the NAFTA Implementation Act were promulgated on December 30, 1993, in a regulation entitled "Temporary Entry of Business Persons Under the North American Free Trade Agreement (NAFTA)".

It amended section 214.6 of the Code of Federal Regulations, title 8, to provide procedures for "Canadian and Mexican citizens seeking temporary entry to engage in business activities at a professional level".

The section states that "Pursuant to the NAFTA, an applicant seeking admission under this section shall demonstrate business activity at a professional level in one of the professions set forth in Appendix 1603.D.1 to Annex 1603" and then sets forth the professions agreed upon by the NAFTA member states.

In 2022, section 214.6 was updated to reflect the transition from NAFTA to USMCA.

== Description ==
The visa category "Professionals Under the North American Free Trade Agreement" (NAFTA), also known as a TN (Treaty NAFTA) visa, is available only to citizens of Canada and Mexico, under the terms of the USMCA (previously NAFTA).

Prior to that, starting in 1989 and continuing through 1993, qualifying individuals practicing one of the professions identified in the Canada–United States Free Trade Agreement (CUSFTA) were able to obtain TC status for legal work in the United States and Canada, creating a limited amount of freedom of labor movement. In 1994, TN status became effective through the North American Free Trade Agreement (NAFTA), which superseded CUSFTA.

=== Qualifications ===
A person may be eligible for TN status, if:

- The prospective employee is a citizen of Canada or Mexico;
- The profession is one cited under the USMCA agreement;
- The company seeking to pursue TN status with the prospective employee meets qualifications cited under the USMCA treaty;
- The prospective employee has been issued a formal, written full-time or part-time offer of employment.

=== Initial period of stay ===
A grant of TN status is typically valid for three years, but only for the specific employer for which it was originally requested. A desired change of employers will require a new authorized period of admission in TN status, whether through the first-time route (TN status directly at the border for Canadian citizens; a new TN visa for Mexican citizens at a U.S. consular post and admission at the border) or via Extension of Stay as part of the new prospective employer's Form I-129 petition on behalf of the prospective employee. If employment with a single employer is desired for more than three years, it may, theoretically, be renewed indefinitely.

Prior to October 16, 2008, the initial period of stay for a TN status holder was up to one year only.

=== Renewal ===
Renewal is accomplished either by an Extension of Stay mail-in renewal within the United States, requested as part of the employer's Form I-129 petition on behalf of the prospective employee, or by replicating the first-time route (TN status directly at the border for Canadian citizens; a new TN visa for Mexican citizens at a U.S. consular post and admission at the border).

While TN status theoretically may be renewed indefinitely in three-year increments, it is not a permanent visa and if U.S. immigration officials suspect it is being used as a de facto green card, and with foreign residence abandoned, then they may elect to deny further renewals. The set of occupations permitted to petition for TN status is also quite a bit more limited than for the H-1B visa.

Renewal is possible, in theory, indefinitely, but the TN status is not a substitute for permanent residency (a green card), and the border official has the discretion to refuse further renewals if she feels the ability for indefinite renewal is being abused. How this happens in practice depends largely on the discretion of the individual border official. Some Canadians have successfully renewed TN status for a decade or more; others have found that after 3–4 years a border official may deny renewal.

=== Dependents ===
The spouse and dependent children under the age of 21 of a TN professional may apply for TD status (TD-1 for the family members of a Canadian citizen worker, or TD-2 for those of a Mexican worker). TD status can't be granted for longer than the period of time granted to the principal TN professional holder.

TD status does not allow them to work, although they are permitted to attend school. In most states, non-resident tuition rates will apply for post-secondary institutions. If the spouse or child requesting TD status is not a Canadian citizen, he or she will usually still qualify for TD status, but must first request a formal TD visa at a U.S. consulate.

The U.S. consulates reported 3,000 to 4,000 TD visas issued in each U.S. fiscal year from 2007 to 2009; this included visas issued both to family members of Mexican TN-2 visa holders and to non-Canadian family members of Canadian TN-1 entrants.

== Canadian citizens ==
For Canadians, TN status does not involve a visa. Canadian professionals are admitted into the United States in TN-1 status at the border. Canadian citizens are not required to obtain a visa, but instead receive TN status with U.S. Customs and Border Protection (CBP) at their port of entry (most commonly it is done upon entry to the United States from Canada, but entry in TN status is permitted at any port of entry, such as an airport with United States border preclearance). The TN status will only be granted if the period of stay is temporary. There is no appeal recourse if one is refused TN status.

Canadian citizenship for TN status purposes may be by descent or grant (naturalization). Those with educational qualifications from sources outside Canada or the U.S. must prove equivalency to the U.S. requirements.

Canadians have two alternative procedures to apply for TN status. One is by going directly to a U.S. port of entry or Canadian airport with U.S. preclearance facility, and the other is by the filing of a Form I-129 petition by the employer to the designated processing office prior to their intended trip into the United States [two- six months processing time, unless you use the Premium Processing service]; Canadians already in the U.S. could do the same, without having to leave.

=== Directly to a port of entry ===
Applying for this status is a fairly streamlined procedure. The Canadian, arriving at the U.S. port of entry no more than the 10 days before the job start allowed by federal regulations, must:

- Request TN status;
- Present a proof of a job offer (Note: The job must be included in Appendix 1603.D.1 of NAFTA, which provides a list of provisions covered by the Agreement) from a U.S.-based employer, in the form of an employment letter detailing a temporary employment for not more than three years;
  - If the job offer documentation does not contain sufficient detail, present a letter addressed to the CBP by the employer asserting the bases on which the offer (and the individual's credentials, to the extent relevant) make that person eligible for TN status;
- Bring the original documentation and provide a copy of the applicant's college degree and employment records which establish qualification for the prospective job;
- Present a proof of Canadian citizenship (passport); and
- Pay a fee of US$50 (plus an additional $6 at a land or sea crossing; this is included in airline tickets when arriving by air).

The U.S. immigration officer will then adjudicate the application on the spot and grant or deny TN status. If the decision is to grant TN status, the Canadian enters the U.S. and begins TN employment. If the decision is to deny, the immigration officer will often detail the shortcomings in the application; if these are relatively straightforward to correct, the Canadian will often correct the problem soon thereafter and then return to the border to reapply.

=== Applying with the USCIS ===
Alternatively, a prospective TN employer can petition USCIS for a foreign national to be either: (a) accorded TN status immediately upon petition approval, by change of status or (b) to be effectively pre-approved as TN-eligible for that specific position, with TN status for the new job to take effect upon the individual next being admitted into the United States at a U.S. port of entry. The procedure for doing this is by submitting Form I-129 petition with a US$460 fee to the appropriate (California or Vermont) USCIS service center.

For option (a) above, USCIS would send a notice approving the petition, along with a Form I-94 reflecting the change of status (or extension of stay, if the worker is already in TN status).

For option (b) above, if USCIS approves Form I-129, the prospective worker may then come seek admission from a CBP officer to the United States as a TN nonimmigrant by providing the following documentation at a U.S. port of entry or at a designated pre-clearance/pre-flight inspection station:

- Proof of Canadian citizenship; and
- Approval notice from USCIS for Form I-129.

In addition, when applying for admission, the applicant should have in their possession a copy of the Form I-129, and all supporting documentation that was submitted to USCIS, in order to respond to any questions about eligibility. The applicant should also be prepared to pay any applicable inspection fees at the time that he or she seeks admission. If a CBP officer finds the applicant to be eligible for admission, the person will be admitted as a TN non-immigrant.

=== Domestic partner/cohabitating partners ===
A TN visa holder may be able to bring their unmarried domestic partner to live with them.

A non-Canadian citizen domestic partner can apply for a B-2 or B-1/B-2 visa from a U.S. consular post, and if issued, seek admission in B-2 classification for up to one year. The inspecting CBP officer might allow a one year admission, or might instead offer the usual six month admission. While in B-2 classification, that domestic partner will not be able to work for a U.S. company in the U.S. or study in the U.S. Study instead could be undertaken by changing classification to one allowing study.

== Mexican citizens in the United States ==
Unless already physically present in the United States and maintaining lawful status in a different classification (and thus potentially eligible for a "Change of Status" procedure to TN classification), a Mexican citizen must first obtain a U.S. TN-2 visa at an American consulate (typically in Mexico). Once the TN visa foil is affixed to the Mexican citizen's passport, he or she may seek admission into the U.S. in TN status in a similar manner to a Canadian citizen. In fiscal years 2007 through 2009, between 4,000 and 5,000 TN visas (including TN-2 visas for Mexicans) were issued by U.S. consulates each year.

Prior to 2004, Mexicans were subject to an annual quota and to procedures similar to an H-1B visa.

== Extension options ==
Renewal/extension of TN status can be done either by mail (which requires filing of Form I-129, "Petition for a Nonimmigrant Worker", by the employer, along with proof of the TN holder's citizenship and education, and an extension letter similar to the original offer letter) or by duplication of the original process (for Mexican citizens, a trip to a U.S. consulate; for Canadians leaving and re-entering U.S., document requirements are similar to those for obtaining the original TN).

TN holders (and any dependents) are not required to leave the U.S. as soon as the TN status expires or the job is terminated; there is a formal grace period of 10 days at end of authorization to "depart the United States or take other actions to extend, change, or otherwise maintain lawful status" and a grace period of up to 60 consecutive days during each authorized validity period for certain high-skilled nonimmigrant workers when their employment ends before the end of their authorized validity period, so they may more readily pursue new employment and an extension of their nonimmigrant status. The individual is legally allowed to remain in the USA to look for another job for 60 days.

== Income tax requirements ==
Canadian TN status workers are responsible for U.S. Medicare, state, federal, and Social Security taxes in the U.S. A Canadian citizen may also be liable for income taxes in Canada, e.g. if considered a factual resident of Canada by maintaining ties.

(Likewise, U.S. citizens working and living in Canada under a work permit pursuant to CUSMA (as USMCA is referred to by Canadian authorities) are also subject to corresponding income tax liabilities and end-of-year filing of tax returns in Canada.)

In general, there can be income tax liabilities in accordance to where the employee works regardless of where legal or physical residence is maintained during employment. This is much like U.S. citizens who live in one state but work in another who are then subject to state income and other taxes in the state in which they work.

If their legal residence is still in their home country, workers may also be required to file a return in their home country. Based on income tax treaties, credit is normally available in the home country for income and other payroll taxes paid in the foreign country. Bilateral treaties exist to allow workers to regain benefits. For example, after a minimum of 1.5 years of work in the U.S., workers become eligible for a pro-rata Social Security benefit under what is known in the U.S. as a totalization agreement. After more than 10 years of work in the U.S., the regular Social Security benefit calculation minus the Windfall Elimination Provision will be applied. Therefore, the worker may receive 3 cheques, one each from the Canada Pension Plan, Old Age Security, and U.S. Social Security.

== Comparison to H-1B visa / "dual intent" issues ==
TN status has some similarities with the H-1B visa. However, TN status may be significantly easier for some Canadians or Mexicans to obtain, as it is not subject to the annual cap that applies to H-1B visa issuance.

An important differences is that TN status does not include the doctrine of dual intent. Therefore, Canadians or Mexicans on TN status must be careful if they desire to ultimately pursue the green card. Either they should first attempt to switch to the H-1B visa before applying for the green card or they must take into careful consideration:

- the likely timeline for the employment/marriage green card process,
- any travel outside the United States that may be needed, particularly after the Form I-485 is filed, but potentially even after Form I-140/Form I-130 is filed, and
- the amount of time remaining in the current TN admission.

The intention to seek permanent residence may be evidenced by the individual's filing of a Form I-485, or, in certain cases, by the filing of a Form I-140 petition by a U.S. employer or a Form I-130 petition by a spouse who is a U.S. citizen or Lawful Permanent Resident. A TN visa holder who will seek adjustment of status may need to avoid travel outside the United States until they obtain an Advance Parole travel permit.

Employers do not need to maintain extensive documents and records on TN workers, unlike with H-1B employees. In the case of an investigation or audit by the Immigration Service or Labor Department, the employer must show that the worker is in valid status. An employer must complete the Form I-9 for employees in TN visa status, as with all other employees.

== Recognized TN professions ==
The following professions qualify for the TN visa. They are covered by Annex 16-A Appendix 2 of the USMCA (previously appendix 1603.D.1 of the North American Free Trade Agreement), and in 8 CFR 214.6.

A

Accountant
Baccalaureate or Licenciatura Degree; or C.P.A., C.A., C.G.A. or C.M.A.

Agriculturist

including Agronomist

Baccalaureate or Licenciatura Degree

Animal Breeder
Baccalaureate or Licenciatura Degree

Animal Scientist
Baccalaureate or Licenciatura Degree

Apiculturist
Baccalaureate or Licenciatura Degree

Architect
Baccalaureate or Licenciatura Degree; or state/provincial license (Note: "State/provincial license" and "state/provincial/federal license" mean any document issued by a state, provincial or federal government, as the case may be, or under its authority, but not by a local government, that permits a person to engage in a regulated activity or profession.)

Astronomer
Baccalaureate or Licenciatura Degree

B

Biochemist
Baccalaureate or Licenciatura Degree

Biologist
Baccalaureate or Licenciatura Degree

C

Chemist
Baccalaureate or Licenciatura Degree

Computer Systems Analyst
Baccalaureate or Licenciatura Degree; or Post-Secondary Diploma (Note: "Post-Secondary Diploma" means a credential issued, on completion of two or more years of postsecondary education, by an accredited academic institution in Canada or the United States.) or Post-Secondary certificate, (Note: "Post-Secondary Certificate" means a certificate issued, on completion of two or more years of postsecondary education at an academic institution, by the federal government of Mexico or a state government in Mexico, an academic institution recognized by the federal government or a state government, or an academic institution created by federal or state law.) and three years' experience

D

Dairy Scientist
Baccalaureate or Licenciatura Degree

Dentist
D.D.S., D.M.D., Doctor en Odontologia or Doctor en Cirugia Dental; or state/provincial license

Dietitian
Baccalaureate or Licenciatura Degree; or state/provincial license

Disaster Relief Insurance Claims Adjuster

claims adjuster employed by an insurance company located in the territory of a Party, or an independent claims adjuster

Baccalaureate or Licenciatura Degree, and successful completion of training in the appropriate areas of insurance adjustment pertaining to disaster relief claims; or three years' experience in claims adjustment and successful completion of training in the appropriate areas of insurance adjustment pertaining to disaster relief claims

E

Economist
Baccalaureate or Licenciatura Degree

Engineer
Baccalaureate or Licenciatura Degree; or state/provincial license

Entomologist
Baccalaureate or Licenciatura Degree

Epidemiologist
Baccalaureate or Licenciatura Degree

F

Forester
Baccalaureate or Licenciatura Degree; or state/provincial license

G

Geneticist
Baccalaureate or Licenciatura Degree

Geologist
Baccalaureate or Licenciatura Degree

Geochemist
Baccalaureate or Licenciatura Degree

Geophysicist

including Oceanographer in Mexico and the United States

Baccalaureate or Licenciatura Degree

Graphic Designer
Baccalaureate or Licenciatura Degree; or Post-Secondary Diploma or Post-Secondary Certificate, and three years' experience

H

Horticulturist
Baccalaureate or Licenciatura Degree

Hotel Manager
Baccalaureate or Licenciatura Degree in hotel/restaurant management; or Post-Secondary Diploma or Post-Secondary Certificate in hotel/restaurant management, and three years' experience in hotel/restaurant management

I

Industrial Designer
Baccalaureate or Licenciatura Degree; or Post-Secondary Diploma or Post-Secondary Certificate, and three years' experience

Interior Designer
Baccalaureate or Licenciatura Degree; or Post-Secondary Diploma or Post-Secondary Certificate, and three years' experience

J

K

L

Land Surveyor
Baccalaureate or Licenciatura Degree; or state/provincial/federal license

Landscape Architect
Baccalaureate or Licenciatura Degree

Lawyer

including Notary in the Province of Quebec

LL.B., J.D., LL.L., B.C.L. or Licenciatura Degree (five years); or membership in a state/provincial bar

Librarian
M.L.S. or B.L.S. (for which another Baccalaureate or Licenciatura Degree was a prerequisite)

M

Management Consultant
Baccalaureate or Licenciatura Degree; or equivalent professional experience as established by statement or professional credential attesting to five years' experience as a management consultant, or five years' experience in a field of specialty related to the consulting agreement

Mathematician

including Statistician and Actuary

Baccalaureate or Licenciatura Degree

Medical Laboratory Technologist (Canada)/Medical Technologist (Mexico and the United States) (Note: A business person in this category must be seeking temporary entry to perform in a laboratory chemical, biological, hematological, immunologic, microscopic or bacteriological tests and analyses for diagnosis, treatment or prevention of disease.)
Baccalaureate or Licenciatura Degree; or Post-Secondary Diploma or Post-Secondary Certificate, and three years' experience

Meteorologist
Baccalaureate or Licenciatura Degree

N

Nutritionist
Baccalaureate or Licenciatura Degree

O

Occupational Therapist
Baccalaureate or Licenciatura Degree; or state/provincial license

P

Pharmacist
Baccalaureate or Licenciatura Degree; or state/provincial license

Pharmacologist
Baccalaureate or Licenciatura Degree

Physician

teaching or research only

M.D. or Doctor en Medicina; or state/provincial license

Physicist

including Oceanographer in Canada

Baccalaureate or Licenciatura Degree

Physiotherapist/Physical Therapist
Baccalaureate or Licenciatura Degree; or state/provincial license

Plant Breeder
Baccalaureate or Licenciatura Degree

Poultry Scientist
Baccalaureate or Licenciatura Degree

Psychologist
State/provincial license; or Licenciatura Degree

Q

R

Range Manager/Range Conservationist
Baccalaureate or Licenciatura Degree

Recreational Therapist
Baccalaureate or Licenciatura Degree

Registered Nurse
State/provincial license; or Licenciatura Degree

Research Assistant

working in a post-secondary educational institution

Baccalaureate or Licenciatura Degree

S

Scientific Technician/Technologist (Note: A business person in this category must be seeking temporary entry to work in direct support of professionals in agricultural sciences, astronomy, biology, chemistry, engineering, forestry, geology, geophysics, meteorology or physics.)
Possession of (a) theoretical knowledge of any of the following disciplines: agricultural sciences, astronomy, biology, chemistry, engineering, forestry, geology, geophysics, meteorology or physics; and (b) the ability to solve practical problems in any of those disciplines, or the ability to apply principles of any of those disciplines to basic or applied research

Social Worker
Baccalaureate or Licenciatura Degree

Soil Scientist
Baccalaureate or Licenciatura Degree

Silviculturist

including Forestry Specialist

Baccalaureate or Licenciatura Degree

T

Teacher

College, Seminary or University teaching only

Baccalaureate or Licenciatura Degree

Technical Publications Writer
Baccalaureate or Licenciatura Degree; or Post-Secondary Diploma or Post-Secondary Certificate, and three years' experience

U

Urban Planner

including Geographer

Baccalaureate or Licenciatura Degree

V

Veterinarian
D.V.M., D.M.V. or Doctor en Veterinaria; or state/provincial license

Vocational Counselor
Baccalaureate or Licenciatura Degree

W

X

Y

Z

Zoologist
Baccalaureate or Licenciatura Degree

== See also ==
- E-3 visa
- Green card
- Citizenship of the United States
