= H-3 visa =

U.S. visa for trainees

An H-3 visa is a visa issued by the U.S. Citizenship and Immigration Services (USCIS) to trainees or special education exchange visitors, who intend to perform their job outside the United States. Trainees' spouses and children who are under the age of 21 may accompany them to, but may not work in, the United States.

== Trainees ==
An H-3 trainee must be invited by an individual or organization to receive training not available in their home country, other than graduate or medical education training, in fields including Agriculture, Commerce, Communications, Finance, Government and Transportation. Physicians are not eligible, but medical students and nurses may use it in certain circumstances.

The employer must demonstrate that the trainee will not be engaged in productive employment unless necessary as part of the training. The petitioner must file form I-129 "Petition for a Nonimmigrant Worker", and if approved, the trainee may remain in the United States for up to two years.

== Special education exchange visitors ==
Special Education Exchange Visitors are to participate in a special education exchange visitor training program for children with physical, mental, or emotional disabilities. There is a cap of 50 visas per year, and only one was approved in 2012. The validity period is 18 months

== See also ==
- H-4 visa
