= T visa =

Type of US visa

T nonimmigrant status, commonly referred to as a T visa, is a nonimmigrant status allowing certain victims of human trafficking (which includes both labor trafficking and sex trafficking) and immediate family members to remain and work temporarily in the United States, typically if they report the crime to law enforcement and agree to help them in the investigation and/or prosecution of the crime(s) committed against them. It also allows close family members of the victims to come to the United States legally. Despite being colloquially referred to as a visa, T status is not technically a visa because it is issued to individuals who are already in the United States.

== Background ==
The United States government estimated in 2002 that each year up to 50,000 people are trafficked illegally into the United States, mostly women and children, and are trapped in slavery-like situations. As a response, it enacted the Victims of Trafficking and Violence Protection Act of 2000 (TVPA), which, among other things, allows such people to apply for three-year temporary visas that lead to permanent resident status. In 2006, Congress modified 8 CFR 214.11(p) to now have the T-visa to be for four years. Although 5,000 are available per year, only 2,000 had been issued as of January, 2009. In 2017, there were 8524 cases of human trafficking being reported to National Human Trafficking Hotline. And up to 2018, the allowed stay period for people who are granted a T visa is still four years.

== Eligibility ==
- T-1 visas are available to people who fall under these criteria:
  - Are present in the United States on account of involuntary servitude, peonage, debt bondage, and/or slavery
  - Committed commercial sex acts as a result of force, fraud, or coercion, (if under 18 when committing commercial sex acts, no force, fraud, or coercion is necessary because minors cannot consent to commercial sex acts)
  - Would suffer extreme hardship if deported
  - Report their trafficking crime to federal authorities and, if at least 18 years old at the time of trafficking, help with all reasonable requests from law enforcement, i.e. investigations and prosecutions. With the 2006 modification, the required compliance with law enforcement was deemed not fit if the victim would undergo any severe trauma. This is better known as the "trauma exception".
  - must include an endorsement from a law enforcement agency included in the T-1 visa application (if the agency chooses to not include an endorsement, the victim must provide sufficient secondary evidence)
- In order to be eligible for a T visa the applicant must demonstrate "unusual or severe harm" if they were to be removed from the United States. This includes:
  - Age and personal circumstances of the T visa applicant.
  - Serious physical or mental illness of the T Visa applicant of which they will be unable to receive treatment in their home country.
  - Likelihood of re-victimization.
  - Reasonable expectation of punishment upon applicants return to home country.
  - Likelihood of harm by traffickers or related individuals upon return.

Related visas include:

- T-2 visas - spouses of T-1 applicants
- T-3 visas - children of T-1 applicants
- T-4 visas - parents of T-1 applicants who are children
- T-5 visas - under-18 unmarried siblings of T-1 applicants
- T-6 visas - adult or minor child of T-2, T-3, T-4, or T-5

== Statistics ==
=== Number of visas issued by year ===
The first T visas were issued in Fiscal Year 2003. In the table below, the years are Fiscal Years, so for instance the year 2009 refers to the period from October 1, 2008 to September 30, 2009. Note that this only counts T visas issued at embassies and consulates outside the United States, and does not include people who changed nonimmigrant status to T status within the United States. The T-1 status is the one most likely to be achieved through change of status within the United States, and therefore T-1 visas are not usually issued.

Fiscal Year	T-1 visas	T-2 visas	T-3 visas	T-4 visas	T-5 visas	Total
2003	0	20	38	0	0	58
2004	0	74	145	0	0	219
2005	0	35	65	7	5	112
2006	0	11	43	5	1	60
2007	0	20	70	5	3	98
2008	0	34	132	5	8	179
2009	0	8	81	3	3	95
2010	0	64	167	7	8	246
2011	0	127	258	10	14	409
2012	0	151	342	7	17	517
2013	0	171	357	22	31	581
2014	0	115	370	18	13	516
2015	0	111	376	10	10	507
2019	0	76	339	17	23	455
2020	0	33	131	18	14	196
2021	0	32	173	28	29	262
2022	0	32	208	27	18	285
2023	0	95	340	58	50	543
