= CW-1 visa =

U.S. visa for temporary workers employed in the Northern Marian Islands

The CW-1 visa is a non-immigrant visa which allows travel to United States for temporary workers to be employed in the Commonwealth of the Northern Mariana Islands (CNMI).

For employers to be eligible to petition for a CW-1 visa, they must:

- Be conducting legitimate business
- First consider any available U.S. citizens for the position
- Offer conditions of employment consistent with their business operations
- Comply with all applicable employment regulations
- Pay reasonable transportation costs for the employee

The duration of stay for the recipient of a CW-1 is one year. A maximum of 11,000 workers may be admitted under this visa class for FY 2023, declining by 1,000 per year to 5,000 in FY 2029, and 1,000 for the first three months of FY 2030. Recipients of a CW-1 may not travel to other parts of the US, with the exception of those who are nationals of the Philippines, who are allowed to travel between the Philippines and CNMI via the Guam airport.

As of 2018, the CW program is set to expire effective December 31, 2029.
