= P visa =

Temporary worker visa for the United States; for athletes, artists and entertainers

P visa is a type of temporary employment visa of the United States, granted to alien athletes, artists, and entertainers, and their spouses and children. The term "P" refers to 8 U.S.C. § 1101(a)(15)(P), Section 101 of the Immigration and Nationality Act.

P visa classifications are as follows:

- P-1 applies to individual or team athletes, or members of an entertainment group (P-1B) that are internationally recognized. A maximum of 25,000 P visas are issued annually.
- P-2 applies to artists or entertainers who will perform under a reciprocal exchange program.
- P-3 applies to artists or entertainers who perform under a program that is culturally unique.
- P-4 is for the spouse, or child under the age of 21, of a P-1, P-2, or P-3 alien and who is accompanying, or following to join, the alien.

A sports team can file petition for its foreign athlete and for a P-1 visa to be granted to the team it must have achieved "international recognition" in the sport. An athlete who will come to the United States to compete in individual events rather than as a team must show that he or she is internationally recognized. United States Citizenship and Immigration Services (USCIS) has defined "international recognition" as "having a high level of achievement in a field evidenced by a degree of skill and recognition substantially above that ordinarily encountered, to the extent that such achievement is renowned, leading, or well-known in more than one country." The event the athlete is coming to the United States to participate in must have a distinguished reputation and must require the participation of athletes and teams of international recognition. The definition is similar to that of O-1B "extraordinary ability," but somewhat more stringent. The reputation of the group, not the individual achievements of its members nor the acclaim of a particular production, is paramount.

A domestic sports team seeking a P-1 visa to hire a player from outside the United States must be part of a league with six or more teams and with a gross revenue of at least $10 million, or be formally affiliated with such a league as a minor league/farm team.

Entertainers must be part of an entertainment group to obtain a P-1 visa. Individual artists cannot usually obtain a P-1 visa, except when joining the rest of their foreign entertainment group already in the United States. Like athletes, entertainers must be "internationally recognized" as outstanding in their area to be granted P visas, and have a sustained period of achievement no less than one year. Additionally, a minimum for 75 percent of the group's individual members must have a substantial relationship to the group, generally satisfied by at least one year of membership.

To establish "international recognition," a petitioner may rely either on documentation of a major, one-time achievement by the group, such as the nomination for, or receipt of, a significant international award or prize, or at least three of the following:

- Has and will perform as leading/starring group in productions/events with distinguished reputations;
- International recognition/acclaim for outstanding achievements;
- Has and will perform as leading/starring group for organizations with distinguished reputations;
- Record of major commercial/critically acclaimed success;
- Significant recognition from organizations, critics, governments, other recognized experts;
- Commanded/will command high salary/other substantial remuneration relative to others similarly situated.

In 2013, professional Canadian League of Legends player Danny "Shiphtur" Le was able to obtain a P-1 visa to come to the US to practice with his Riverside, California based team, becoming the first electronic sports player to do so.
