= C-1 visa =

The C-1 visa is a type of visa reserved for immediate and continuous transit through the United States to a foreign country. Interviews are not required for individuals younger than 13 or older than 80. Recipients are not eligible for an extension or change of status, and must possess sufficient funds to effect transit and enter the destination foreign country. The maximum term of stay is 29 days.
