= H-4 visa =

U.S. visa for family members of other H-series visas

An H-4 visa is a United States visa issued to dependent family members of H-1B, H-1B1, H-2A, H-2B, and H-3 visa holders to allow them to travel to the United States to accompany or reunite with the principal visa holder. A dependent family member is a spouse or unmarried child under the age of 21. If a dependent of an H-1B, H-1B1, H-2A, H-2B, or H-3 worker is already in the United States, they can apply for H-4 immigration status by filing Form I-539 for change of status with United States Citizenship and Immigration Services (USCIS).

Family members may alternatively be admitted in other non-immigrant categories for which they qualify, such as the F-1 category for children or spouses who will be students or the H-1B category for a spouse whose employer has also obtained approval of an H-1B visa petition to employ the spouse. An H-4 visa holder is admitted to the U.S. for the duration of the primary (H-1B, H-1B1, H-2A, H-2B, or H-3) immigration status.

A noncitizen with H-4 immigration status normally is not permitted to engage in employment in the United States but there is one important exception to this rule. All H-4 noncitizens are permitted to study in the United States.

== Application process ==
=== Applying from outside the United States ===
H-4 visa applicants outside the United States must complete Form DS-160 (Online Nonimmigrant Visa Application) and schedule an interview at a U.S. embassy or consulate. Required documents typically include:

- A valid passport with at least six months validity beyond the intended period of stay
- A photograph meeting U.S. Department of State specifications
- A marriage certificate (for spouses) or birth certificate (for children) proving relationship to the principal visa holder
- Evidence of the principal's H-1B status, such as pay stubs, employment verification letter, and federal tax returns

=== Applying from within the United States ===
Dependents already in the United States may apply for H-4 status by filing Form I-539 (Application to Extend/Change Nonimmigrant Status) with USCIS. The I-539 is also used to extend H-4 status before expiration.

== Employment authorization ==
On February 24, 2015, U.S. Citizenship and Immigration Services (USCIS) Director León Rodríguez announced that, effective May 26, 2015, the Department of Homeland Security (DHS) would extend eligibility for employment authorization to certain H-4 dependent spouses of H-1B non-immigrants who are seeking employment-based lawful permanent resident (LPR) status. DHS amended the regulations to allow these H-4 dependent spouses to accept employment in the United States. These H-4 dependent spouses are also eligible to receive social security numbers.

An H-4 dependent spouse of an H-1B non-immigrant can file Form I-765, Application for Employment Authorization to obtain an employment authorization document (EAD), if the H-1B non-immigrant:

- Is the principal beneficiary of an approved Form I-140, Immigrant Petition for Alien Worker; or
- Has been granted H-1B status under sections 106(a) and (b) of the American Competitiveness in the 21st Century Act as amended by the 21st Century Department of Justice Appropriations Authorization Act (AC21).

The H-4 EAD rule was established by a 2015 USCIS final rule, and applies to spouses of H-1B workers who are beneficiaries of approved immigrant petitions or who have been granted extensions beyond the six-year limit under AC21.

Other H-4 visa holders are not eligible to get a Social Security Number and cannot be employed, but they are eligible to hold a driver's license and open bank accounts. If an H-4 noncitizen is not eligible for employment authorization in the United States, they may nevertheless have tax liability in the United States, and in order to file a U.S. tax return, must obtain an ITIN (Individual Taxpayer Identification Number).

On the Spring 2019 Regulatory Agenda, the Trump administration announced a proposed regulation to rescind the 2015 rule and to stop granting employment authorization to H-4 spouses. Some media outlets reported that the majority of people who would lose work authorization as a result of the proposal were highly skilled Indian women. USCIS data backs up the assertion that the vast majority of H-4 EAD beneficiaries are Indian women. The proposal to rescind the H-4 EAD program was withdrawn by the Biden administration in January 2021. However, the future of the H-4 EAD program continues to be threatened by ongoing litigation against DHS in U.S. federal court which alleges that the H-4 EAD program is illegal.

== Statistics ==
=== Number of visas issued by year ===
Fiscal Year (Note: Fiscal year refers to the twelve-month period that ended on September 30 of the year indicated.)	Total number of H-4 visas issued (Note: Only counts includes H-4 visas obtained at the United States consulate or embassy abroad, and not changes of status to H-4 within the United States using Form I-539.)
1997	47,206
1998	54,595
1999	69,194
2000	79,518
2001	95,967
2002	79,725
2003	69,289
2004	83,128
2005	70,266
2006	74,326
2007	86,219
2008	71,019
2009	60,009
2010	66,176
2011	74,205
2012	80,015
2013	96,753
2014	109,147
2015	124,484
2016	131,051
2017	136,393

== See also ==
- List of United States dependent visas
