= V visa =

The V visa was a temporary United States visa available to spouses and minor children (unmarried, under 21) of US lawful permanent residents (LPR, also known as green card holders). It allowed permanent residents to join their spouses and children while the immigration process took its course. The visa was created by the Legal Immigration Family Equity Act of 2000. The act relieved those who applied for immigrant visas on or before December 21, 2000. The V visa is not available to spouses and minor children of LPRs who applied after December 21, 2000.

== Background ==
A permanent resident is a person who has been granted the right to reside permanently in the U.S. Permanent residents have work authorization, and have the right to become a U.S. citizen after meeting certain criteria. The permanent resident is the sponsor of an immigrant visa petition, and the spouse (or child) is the beneficiary.

A permanent resident who marries a non-U.S. citizen or permanent resident must file Form I-130 (Petition for Alien Relative) with USCIS. When the I-130 is approved, the beneficiary may need to wait for an F2A immigrant visa. F2A immigrant visas were backlogged because only 87,934 visas are available each year, and demand exceeds supply. Processing delays for the I-130 can be viewed at the USCIS website. The backlog of F2A visas is updated monthly, and the date is available in the Visa Bulletin posted on the State Department's website.

While waiting for the I-130 to be approved or an F2A visa to become available, a beneficiary may visit the U.S. on a B-2 visa (maximum 90- or 180-day stay) or under the Visa Waiver Program (VWP, maximum 90-day stay). In many cases, however, their application for a B-2 visa or entry under the VWP is denied. A beneficiary is not allowed to use this program in a manner suggesting that they are living in the U.S. without an immigrant visa; visitor and student visas (or the VWP) require demonstration of non-immigrant intent. A permanent resident cannot be away from the U.S. for a long period, to avoid losing permanent-resident status.

This situation often separates a permanent resident from their spouse or child. In 2010, it took four to five years to reunite families.

== Visa ==
The V visa was available to beneficiaries who satisfied the following conditions:

- An immigrant petition (I-130) was filed by the sponsor for the beneficiary on or before December 21, 2000.
- The beneficiary was waiting for at least three years since the I-130 was filed.

The V visa was available even if the underlying petition had not been approved. With this visa, a nuclear family could achieve unity in the U.S. The spouse could work, and the child could go to school. International travel was permitted. The V visa is valid as long as the underlying immigrant petition is valid. The visa's sunset date was December 21, 2000.

== Family unity in other categories ==
Non-immigrant visa holders, such as students, specialty workers and intra-company transferees, generally do not face this issue. Their spouses and minor children are eligible for dependent visas, which are not subject to numerical limits or significant processing delays.

Most U.S. citizens also do not encounter major delays when sponsoring immediate relatives. Although they must file Form I-130 (Petition for Alien Relative) for their spouses and minor children, immigrant visas are immediately available to these beneficiaries. If the process is prolonged, U.S. citizens may seek K visas to allow spouses or fiancés to enter the United States while awaiting final approval. Even without a visa backlog, the overall process typically takes between one and three years due to processing times at U.S. Citizenship and Immigration Services (USCIS) (about six to 10 months), the National Visa Center (one to four months), and U.S. consulates (one to six months). Under 2007 immigration law, lawful permanent residents must wait several years before their spouses and minor children become eligible for admission to the United States.

== Legislation ==
Bills have been introduced in Congress to address this issue. H.R. 1823 (109th Congress) addressed this by reinstating the V visa. S.1919 (also 109th Congress) reclassified spouses and children of permanent residents as immediate relatives. This classification removed the numerical limits on the number of immigrant visas available to them. Other bills offered partial solutions to the problem but, with a new session of Congress that began in January 2007, those bills lapsed; new bills would have to be introduced for any relief. Most other developed nations do not separate nuclear families; Canada, for example, expedites family-unity petitions.

== Visas issued by year ==
The first V visas were issued in fiscal year 2001, after the LIFE Act became law. In the table below, fiscal years run from October 1 to September 30; FY 2009 refers to the period from October 1, 2008, to September 30, 2009. These statistics are for V visas issued at embassies and consulates outside the United States, and does not include people who changed non-immigrant status to V status in the United States. The most recent V visas were issued in FY 2007.

Fiscal year	V-1 visas	V-2 visas	V-3 visas	Total
2001	9,127	14,805	1,400	25,332
2002	18,020	19,523	19,567	57,110
2003	13,983	12,918	16,302	43,203
2004	6,896	7,217	6,856	20,969
2005	911	951	1,165	3,027
2006	166	133	281	580
2007	30	23	51	104

== See also ==
- Family reunification
