= A visa =

US Visa category

An A Visa is a category of non-immigrant visas allowing travel to the United States issued to ambassadors, diplomats, government officials, and their support staff.

== Types ==
=== A-1 ===
The A-1 visa is granted to many people such as ambassadors, ministers, diplomats, consular officers, and their immediate family members. (Note: Effective October 1, 2018, the unmarried domestic partner of a government official is no longer eligible for a derivative A-1 or A-2 visa. The only exception is in the case of countries where same-sex marriage is not legally available, but the sending nation accepts accreditation of U.S. same-sex spouses with the same privileges and immunities as opposite-sex spouses.) While government officials normally do not qualify for an A-1 visa if they are traveling for non-official, non-governmental purposes, heads of state and heads of government always qualify and must apply for an A visa regardless of their purpose of travel. Visitors on an A-1 visa cannot be tried under US law for a crime, and may travel to and from the country an unlimited number of times. There is no maximum length of stay for individuals admitted on an A-1 visa, and there is no requirement to maintain a foreign residence.

=== A-2 ===
The A-2 visa is granted to certain government officials, employees, their immediate families, and their technical and support staff. This includes military personnel traveling for reasons not related to NATO. (Note: Those whose travel directly relates to NATO will normally qualify for one of the seven NATO visa classes.) Those typically admitted under an A-2 visa include:

- Individuals traveling to work at a consulate or embassy in the US
- Individuals traveling to the US on the written request of their home country
- Members of foreign militaries stationed at US military installations
- Representatives from the African Union or European Union

There is a maximum limit of 5 years (no renewal possible) on the duration of stay for A-2 visa holders, and no requirement to maintain a foreign residence.

=== A-3 ===
The A-3 visa is granted to attendants, servants, and employees of those in the US under A-1 or A-2 visas. A-3 recipients fall into two categories: those paid by the principal applicant's home government, and domestic employees paid by the principal applicant themselves. The maximum duration of stay is three years, and individuals are exempt from US taxes.
