= B visa =

Visitor visa for the United States

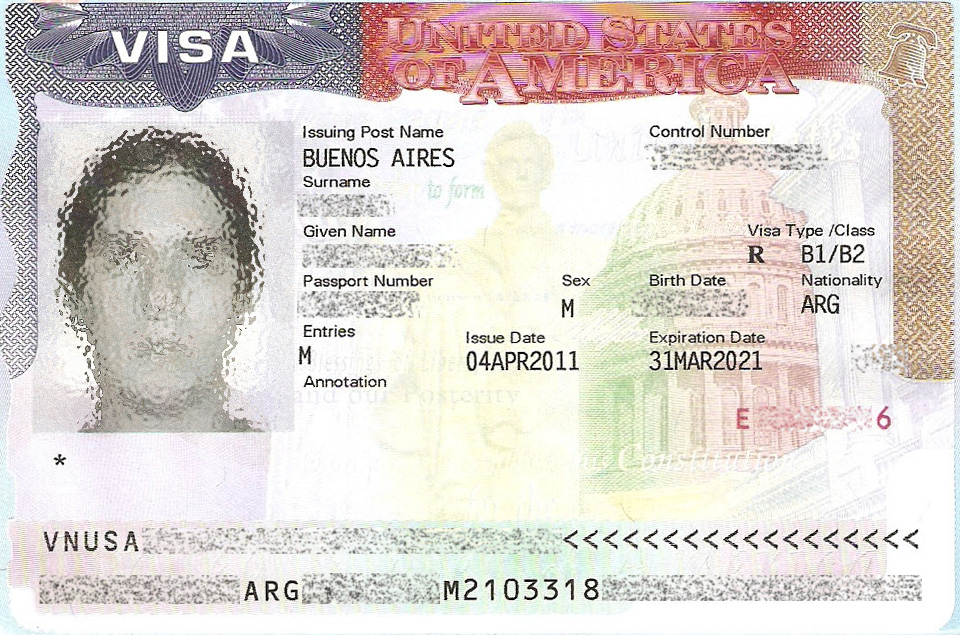
B-1/B-2 visa for a national of Argentina

A B visa is one of a category of non-immigrant visas issued by the United States government to foreign nationals seeking entry for a temporary period. The two types of B visa are the B-1 visa, issued to those seeking entry for business purposes, and the B-2 visa, issued to those seeking entry for tourism or other non-business purposes. In practice, the two visa categories are usually combined and issued as a "B-1/B-2 visa" valid for a temporary visit for either business or pleasure, or a combination of the two. Nationals of certain countries do not usually need to obtain a visa for these purposes.

== Acceptable and prohibited uses of a B-1 or B-2 visa ==
=== Acceptable uses of a B-1 visa ===
Under the category of temporary visitor for business, a B-1 visa may be used to enter the U.S. to engage in any of the following activities.

- Hold business meetings
- Perform certain business functions as a member of the board of directors of a U.S. corporation
- Purchase supplies or materials
- Interview and hire staff
- Negotiate contracts, sign contracts, or take orders for products manufactured outside the United States
- Attend a convention, meeting, trade show, or business event for scientific, educational, professional, or business purposes
- Settle an estate
- Perform independent research
- Receive practical medical experience and medical instruction under the supervision and direction of faculty physicians at a U.S. medical school's hospital as part of a third-year or fourth-year internship as long as the visitor is a studying at a foreign medical school and the visitor is not compensated by the hospital without remuneration from the hospital
- Observe U.S. medical practices and consult with medical colleagues on techniques, as long as the visitor is a medical doctor, the visitor receives no compensation from a U.S. source, and the visitor does not provide patient care while in the U.S.
- Take photographs, as long as the visitor is a professional photographer and the visitor receives no compensation from a U.S. source
- Record music, as long as the visitor is a musician, the recording will be distributed and sold only outside the U.S., and the visitor will give no public performances
- Create art, as long as the visitor is a creative artist, the visitor is not under contract with a U.S. employer, and the visitor does not intend to regularly sell such artwork in the U.S.
- Perform certain professional services
- Perform as a professional entertainer as part of a cultural exchange program performed before a nonpaying audience and funded by the visitor's country
- Perform as a professional entertainer as part of a competition for which there is no compensation other than travel expenses or, in certain limited instances, a prize
- Perform work as crew on a private yacht that sails out of a foreign home port and cruises in U.S. waters
- Perform services on behalf of a foreign-based employer as a jockey, sulky driver, horse trainer, or horse groomer
- Compete in a particular athletic competition with the only compensation being prize money as long as the prize money is not the recipient's primary source of income
- Try out for a professional sports team as long as the visitor is not compensated other than reimbursement of travel expenses
- Participate in an athletic tournament or athletic sporting event as a professional athlete, as long as the visitor's only compensation is prize money, the visitor's principal place of business or activity is outside the U.S., the visitor's primary source of income is outside the U.S., and the visitor is either part of an international sports league or the sporting activities involved have an international dimension
- Survey potential sites for a business
- Perform as a lecturer or speaker
- Work for a foreign exhibitor in connection with exhibits at international fairs or international exhibits, as long as the visitor's employment responsibilities are primarily outside the U.S.
- Install, service, or repair commercial or industrial equipment or machinery that was sold by a non-U.S. company to a U.S. buyer when specifically required by the purchase contract; construction work is not allowed
- Perform a minor amount of volunteer services, excluding construction, for a religious organization or a nonprofit charitable organization, as long as volunteering is not the primary purpose of entering the U.S.
- Participate in a training program that is not designed primarily to provide employment
- Observe how a business operates or how professional activities are conducted
- Seek investments in the U.S., without actually performing productive labor or actively participating in the management of a business
- Participate in Peace Corps training as a volunteer or under contract
- Participate in the United Nations Institute for Training and Research internship program, as long a foreign government does not employ the visitor
- Drill for oil on the Outer Continental Shelf
- As a minister of religion, engage in an evangelical tour, as long as the visitor does not intend to take an appointment with any one church and the visitor will be supported by offerings contributed at each evangelical meeting
- As a minister of religion, temporarily exchange pulpits with U.S. ministers of religion, as long as the visitor will continue to be reimbursed by a foreign church and will not be compensated by the U.S. church
- Perform missionary work, religious instruction, religious aid to the elderly or needy, or religious proselytizing as a member of a religious denomination, as long as the work does not involve the selling of articles, the solicitation of donation, the acceptance of donations, administrative work, or is a substitute for ordinary labor for hire, and the visitor will not be compensated from U.S. sources other than an allowance or other reimbursement for travel expenses incidental to the temporary stay
- Participating in an organized project conducted by a recognized religious or nonprofit charitable organization that benefits U.S. local communities, as long as the visitor is a member of, and has a commitment to, the particular organization, the visitor receives no compensation from a U.S. source other than reimbursement of travel expenses
- Work as a personal employee or a domestic employee of an employer who seeks admission into, or who is already in, the United States in B, E, F, H, I, J, L, M, O, P, Q, or R non-immigrant status, if and only if the employee has been employed outside the U.S. in a similar capacity prior to the date the employer enters the U.S., the employee has a residence outside the U.S. that the employee has no intention of abandoning, the employer compensates the employee based on the prevailing wage, and the employer provides the employee free room and board.
- Work as a personal employee or a domestic employee of a U.S. citizen employer, if and only if the employer ordinarily resides outside the U.S.; the employer is traveling to the U.S. temporarily; the employer is subject to frequent international transfers of at least two years; the employer will reside in the U.S. for no more than four year as a condition of employment; the employer has regularly employed a domestic employee in the same capacity while outside the U.S.; the employee has a minimum of one year of experience in the same capacity; the employer provides the employee with the prevailing wage, room, board, and round-trip transportation; and the employee has a residence outside the U.S. that the employee has no intention of abandoning.

=== Acceptable uses of a B-2 visa ===
Under the category of temporary visitor for pleasure, a B-2 visa can be used to enter the U.S. to engage in any of the following activities.

- Travel within the U.S.
- Visit family or friends
- Participate in a convention, a conference, or a convocation of a fraternal, social, or service nature
- Obtain medical treatment, as long as the visitor has the means to pay for it
- Enroll in a short, recreational course of study, as long as it is not credited toward a degree
- Participate in an event, talent show, or a contest as an amateur, as long the visitor is not typically compensated for such participation and the visitor does not actually receive payment, other than reimbursement of travel expenses
- Enter as a dependent of an alien member of any branch of the U.S. Armed Forces temporarily assigned for duty in the U.S.
- Accompany a person with either a D-1 visa or a D-2 visa with the sole purpose of accompanying the person
- Enter with the intent of becoming engaged, meeting the family of a fiancé, making arrangements for a wedding, or renewing a relationship with a fiancé
- Enter with the intent of marrying a U.S. citizen and then return to a residence outside the U.S. after the marriage
- Accompany a spouse or child who is a U.S. citizen on a temporary visit to the U.S.
- Enter as a cohabiting (unmarried) partner of a non-immigrant visa holder if the partner is not otherwise eligible for derivative status under the partner's visa classification.

=== Prohibited uses ===
A person who enters the U.S. with a B-1 visa or a B-2 visa is prohibited from engaging in any of the following activities.

- Employment, whether paid or unpaid (some exceptions apply)
- Receive education that credits to a degree
- Arrive in the U.S. as a part of a crew of a ship or an aircraft
- Work as a journalist or other information media
- Perform before a paying audience
- Live permanently or long-term in the U.S.
- Manage a business located in the U.S.
- Start a new branch, subsidiary, or affiliate of a foreign employer
- Enter the U.S. with the purpose of performing emergency response services

== Requirement to overcome presumption of intending immigrant ==
Under section 214(b) of the Immigration and Nationality Act, a foreigner must prove to the satisfaction of the consular officer his or her intent to return to his home country after visiting the United States. The act specifically states:

Every alien (other than a nonimmigrant described in subparagraph (L) or (V) of section 101(a)(15), and other than a nonimmigrant described in any provision of section 101(a)(15)(H)(i) except subclause (b1) of such section) shall be presumed to be an immigrant until he establishes to the satisfaction of the consular officer, at the time of application for a visa, and the immigration officers, at the time of application for admission, that he is entitled to a nonimmigrant status under section 101(a)(15).

In practice, this means that consular officers have wide discretion to deny a visa application. Once refused, there is no judicial or other means to challenge a visa decision. The foreigner, however, is free to apply for a visa again, particularly if circumstances have changed that might show to the consular officer that the applicant overcomes the presumption of being an intending immigrant.

== Cost ==
All applicants for a B-1 and/or B-2 visa must pay an application fee, US$185 as of 2026. If the application is approved, nationals of a few countries must also pay an issuance fee, based on reciprocity, varying by nationality, desired visa validity, number of entries and visa subtype (B-1, B-2 or combined B-1/B-2).

As of 2026, only nationals of the following countries must pay the issuance fee.

Country	Issuance fee (USD)	Entries	Validity	Notes
Cameroon	35	1	3 months	
Comoros	0	1	2 months	
Comoros	282	multiple	1 year	
Gambia	15	1	3 months	
Malawi	35	1	3 months	
Myanmar	0	1	3 months	For B-2 or B-1/B-2.
Myanmar	415	1	3 months	For B-1 only.
Nauru	0	multiple	5 years	For B-1 only.
Nauru	7	1	3 months	For B-2 only.
Papua New Guinea	0	1	6 months	
Papua New Guinea	165	multiple	1 year	For B-1 only.
Turkmenistan	330	1	3 months	

Nationals of certain countries must also pay a bond between $5,000 and $15,000, which is refunded after the visa expires if the holder has complied with the visa conditions. The One Big Beautiful Bill Act, enacted in July 2025, would require all applicants to pay a $250 "visa integrity fee", which would also be similarly refunded after visa expiration and compliance.

=== History ===
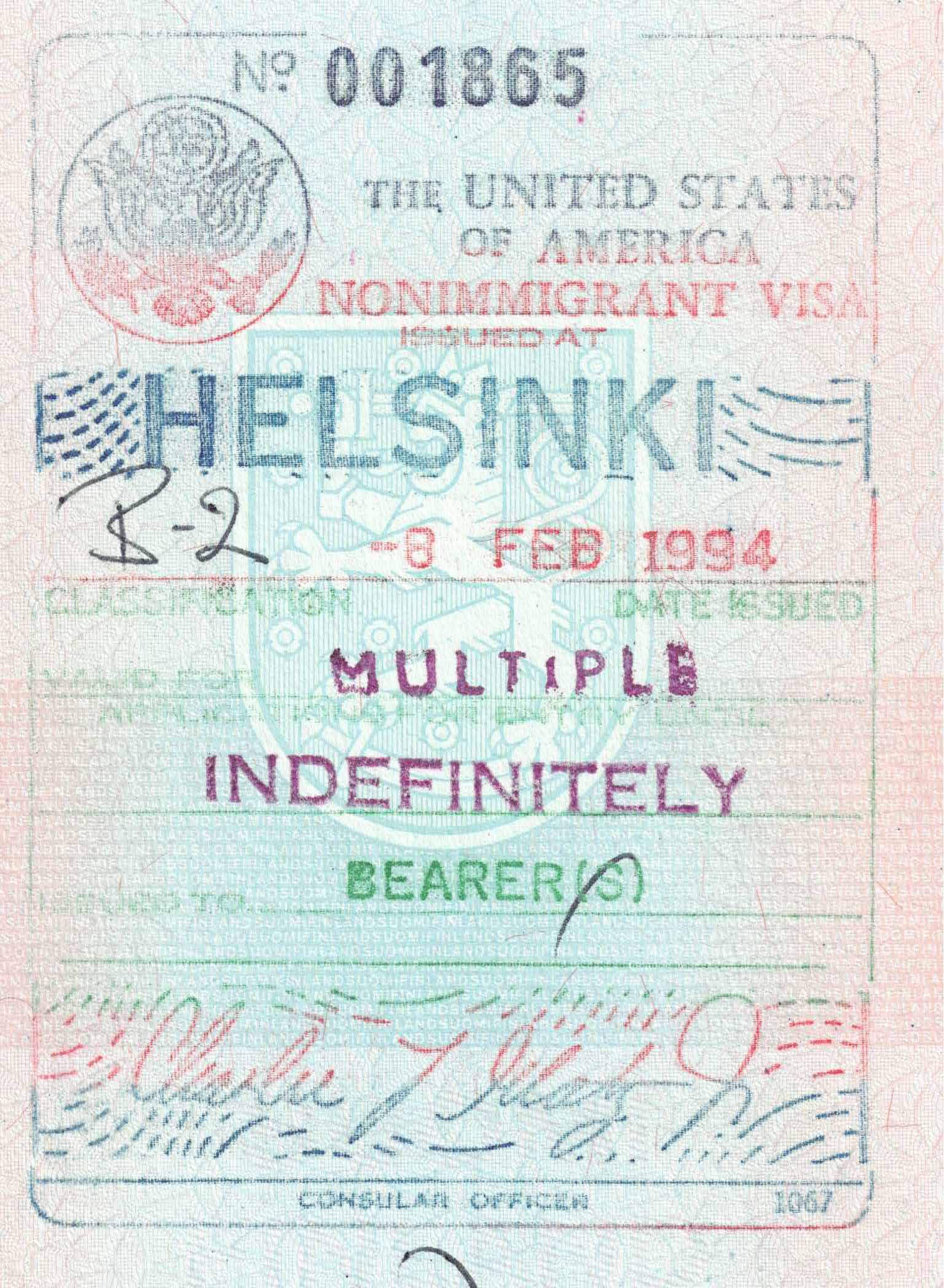
Indefinite validity (Burroughs) B-2 bearer visa issued by the US Embassy in Helsinki, Finland in 1994

Prior to 1994, visas could be issued with indefinite validity, limited only by the validity of the containing passport. These visas were also known as Burroughs visas, since they were produced with a Standard Register protectograph, also known as a Burroughs certifier machine. There was no application fee, and only the issuance fee was charged, varying by nationality based on reciprocity. For certain countries, officers were also authorized to issue them to the "bearer" of the passport, instead of having to write their name.

The issuance of indefinite validity visas was stopped on April 4, 1994. As more costly machine-readable visas were introduced to replace stamped visas, the application fee was introduced for all applicants, in addition to the reciprocal issuance fee. The application fee was initially US$20, and has increased several times since then.

Bearer visas became obsolete with the rollout of machine-readable visas, which were all individually qualified. Burroughs visas became void on April 1, 2004.

Changes in application fee
Date	Application fee (USD)
16 May 1994	20
1 February 1998	45
1 June 2002	65
1 November 2002	100
1 January 2008	131
4 June 2010	140
13 April 2012	160
17 June 2023	185

== Validity period and duration of stay ==
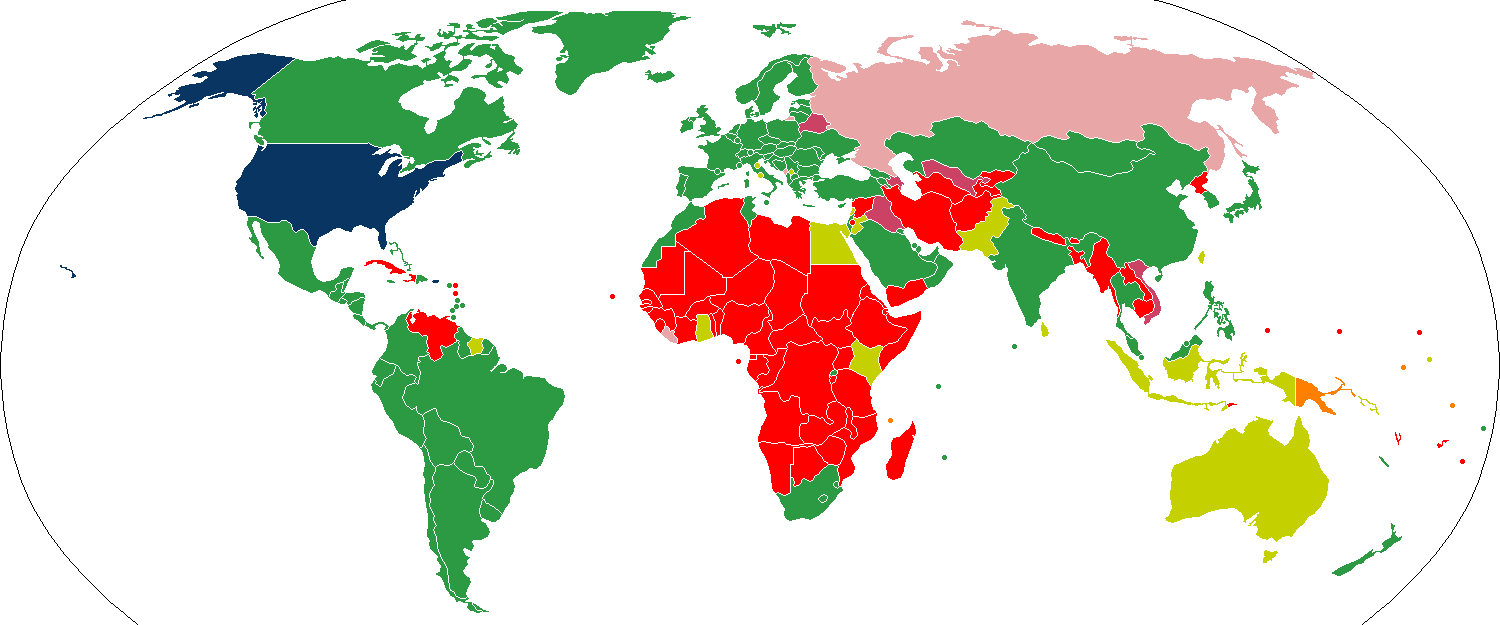
US B visa validity period per country United States: 10 years 4–5 years 2–3 years / 1 year 3 months 1 month–5 years (depending on issuance fee or visa subtype)

As with other non-immigrant U.S. visas, a B-1/B-2 visa has a validity period (from 1 month to 10 years), allows for one, two, three or multiple entries into the U.S., and elicits a period of stay (maximum 6 months) recorded by the Customs and Border Protection officer at the port of entry on the individual's form I-94. The validity period determines how long the visa may be used to enter the U.S., while the period of stay determines how long the person may stay in the U.S. after each entry.

Validity periods per country are listed in the U.S. Department of State visa reciprocity tables and vary from 1 month for Tuvalu (for B-1), 1 year for Vietnam, 3 years for Russia, and 5 years for Pakistan, to 10 years for China, India, Philippines, and most countries in the Americas and Europe. For some countries, longer validity periods are available for higher issuance fees or for certain visa subtypes.

Periods of stay for B-1 visas may be granted initially for a duration long enough to allow the visitor to conduct their business, up to a maximum of 6 months, and can be extended for another 6 months; stays with B-1 visas are usually granted for three months or less, while stays with B-2 visas are generally granted for six months. Extensions are possible, provided the individual has not violated the conditions of admission.

A Border Crossing Card (BCC), also called a laser visa, has a 10-year validity and functions as both a BCC and a B-1/B-2 visitor visa. The BCC is only issued to nationals of Mexico who apply for a visa inside Mexico.

Validity of B visas by nationality, as of 2026:

Country	Issuance fee (USD)	Entries	Validity	Notes
Afghanistan	0	1	3 months	
Albania	0	multiple	10 years	
Algeria	0	1	3 months	
Andorra	0	multiple	10 years	May also enter without a visa, with ESTA.
Angola	0	1	3 months	
Antigua and Barbuda	0	1	3 months	
Argentina	0	multiple	10 years	
Armenia	0	multiple	10 years	
Australia	0	multiple	5 years	May also enter without a visa, with ESTA.
Austria	0	multiple	10 years	May also enter without a visa, with ESTA.
Azerbaijan	0	multiple	1 year	
Bahamas	0	multiple	10 years	May also enter without a visa if traveling directly from the country through airport preclearance and holding a police certificate showing no criminal record.
Bahrain	0	multiple	10 years	
Bangladesh	0	1	3 months	
Barbados	0	multiple	10 years	
Belarus	0	multiple	1 year	
Belgium	0	multiple	10 years	May also enter without a visa, with ESTA.
Belize	0	multiple	10 years	
Benin	0	1	3 months	
Bhutan	0	1	3 months	
Bolivia	0	multiple	10 years	
Bosnia and Herzegovina	0	multiple	10 years	
Botswana	0	1	3 months	
Brazil	0	multiple	10 years	
Brunei	0	multiple	10 years	May also enter without a visa, with ESTA.
Bulgaria	0	multiple	10 years	
Burkina Faso	0	1	3 months	
Burundi	0	1	3 months	
Cambodia	0	1	3 months	
Cameroon	35	1	3 months	
Canada	0	multiple	10 years	May also enter without a visa or ESTA.
Cape Verde	0	1	3 months	
Central African Republic	0	1	3 months	
Chad	0	1	3 months	
Chile	0	multiple	10 years	May also enter without a visa, with ESTA.
China	0	multiple	10 years	Electronic Visa Update System (EVUS) enrollment is required for 10-year validity B visa holders. Chinese Communist Party members and their spouses and children under age 21 are issued B visas for single entry with 1-month validity.
Colombia	0	multiple	10 years	
Comoros	0	1	2 months	
Comoros	282	multiple	1 year	
Congo	0	1	3 months	
Costa Rica	0	multiple	10 years	
Croatia	0	multiple	10 years	May also enter without a visa, with ESTA.
Cuba	0	1	3 months	
Cyprus	0	multiple	10 years	
Czech Republic	0	multiple	10 years	May also enter without a visa, with ESTA.
Democratic Republic of the Congo	0	1	3 months	
Denmark	0	multiple	10 years	May also enter without a visa, with ESTA.
Djibouti	0	1	3 months	
Dominica	0	1	3 months	
Dominican Republic	0	multiple	10 years	
Ecuador	0	multiple	10 years	
Egypt	0	multiple	5 years	
El Salvador	0	multiple	10 years	
Equatorial Guinea	0	1	3 months	
Eritrea	0	1	3 months	
Estonia	0	multiple	10 years	May also enter without a visa, with ESTA.
Eswatini	0	multiple	10 years	
Ethiopia	0	1	3 months	
Fiji	0	1	3 months	
Finland	0	multiple	10 years	May also enter without a visa, with ESTA.
France	0	multiple	10 years	May also enter without a visa, with ESTA.
Gabon	0	1	3 months	
Gambia	15	1	3 months	
Georgia	0	multiple	10 years	
Germany	0	multiple	10 years	May also enter without a visa, with ESTA.
Ghana	0	multiple	5 years	
Greece	0	multiple	10 years	May also enter without a visa, with ESTA.
Grenada	0	multiple	10 years	
Guatemala	0	multiple	10 years	
Guinea	0	1	3 months	
Guinea-Bissau	0	1	3 months	
Guyana	0	multiple	10 years	
Haiti	0	1	3 months	
Honduras	0	multiple	10 years	
Hong Kong	0	multiple	10 years	
Hungary	0	multiple	10 years	May also enter without a visa, with ESTA.
Iceland	0	multiple	10 years	May also enter without a visa, with ESTA.
India	0	multiple	10 years	
Indonesia	0	multiple	5 years	
Iran	0	1	3 months	
Iraq	0	multiple	1 year	
Ireland	0	multiple	10 years	May also enter without a visa, with ESTA.
Israel	0	multiple	10 years	May also enter without a visa, with ESTA.
Italy	0	multiple	10 years	May also enter without a visa, with ESTA.
Ivory Coast	0	1	3 months	
Jamaica	0	multiple	10 years	
Japan	0	multiple	10 years	May also enter without a visa, with ESTA.
Jordan	0	multiple	5 years	
Kazakhstan	0	multiple	10 years	
Kenya	0	multiple	5 years	
Kiribati	0	multiple	4 years	
Kosovo	0	multiple	5 years	
Kuwait	0	multiple	10 years	
Kyrgyzstan	0	1	3 months	
Laos	0	1	3 months	
Latvia	0	multiple	10 years	May also enter without a visa, with ESTA.
Lebanon	0	multiple	5 years	
Lesotho	0	multiple	10 years	
Liberia	0	multiple	3 years	
Libya	0	1	3 months	
Liechtenstein	0	multiple	10 years	May also enter without a visa, with ESTA.
Lithuania	0	multiple	10 years	May also enter without a visa, with ESTA.
Luxembourg	0	multiple	10 years	May also enter without a visa, with ESTA.
Macau	0	multiple	10 years	
Madagascar	0	multiple	3 months	
Malawi	35	1	3 months	
Malaysia	0	multiple	10 years	
Maldives	0	multiple	10 years	
Mali	0	1	3 months	
Malta	0	multiple	10 years	May also enter without a visa, with ESTA.
Marshall Islands	0	1	3 months	May also enter without a visa or ESTA.
Mauritania	0	1	3 months	
Mauritius	0	multiple	10 years	
Mexico	0	multiple	10 years	
Micronesia	0	2	3 months	May also enter without a visa or ESTA.
Moldova	0	multiple	10 years	
Monaco	0	multiple	10 years	May also enter without a visa, with ESTA.
Mongolia	0	multiple	10 years	
Montenegro	0	multiple	3 years	
Morocco	0	multiple	10 years	
Mozambique	0	1	3 months	For B-1/B-2 only.
Mozambique	0	3	3 months	For B-1 or B-2.
Mozambique	0	multiple	3 months	For B-1/B-2 only.
Myanmar	0	1	3 months	For B-2 or B-1/B-2.
Myanmar	415	1	3 months	For B-1 only.
Namibia	0	1	3 months	
Nauru	0	multiple	5 years	For B-1 only.
Nauru	7	1	3 months	For B-2 only.
Nepal	0	1	3 months	
Netherlands	0	multiple	10 years	May also enter without a visa, with ESTA.
New Zealand	0	multiple	10 years	May also enter without a visa, with ESTA.
Nicaragua	0	multiple	10 years	
Niger	0	1	3 months	
Nigeria	0	1	3 months	
North Korea	0	2	3 months	
North Macedonia	0	multiple	10 years	
Norway	0	multiple	10 years	May also enter without a visa, with ESTA.
Oman	0	multiple	10 years	
Pakistan	0	multiple	5 years	
Palau	0	2	3 months	May also enter without a visa or ESTA.
Palestine	0	1	3 months	
Panama	0	multiple	10 years	
Papua New Guinea	0	1	6 months	
Papua New Guinea	165	multiple	1 year	For B-1 only.
Paraguay	0	multiple	10 years	
Peru	0	multiple	10 years	
Philippines	0	multiple	10 years	
Poland	0	multiple	10 years	May also enter without a visa, with ESTA.
Portugal	0	multiple	10 years	May also enter without a visa, with ESTA.
Qatar	0	multiple	10 years	May also enter without a visa, with ESTA.
Romania	0	multiple	10 years	
Russia	0	multiple	3 years	
Rwanda	0	multiple	10 years	
Saint Kitts and Nevis	0	multiple	10 years	
Saint Lucia	0	multiple	10 years	
Saint Vincent and the Grenadines	0	multiple	10 years	
Samoa	0	multiple	10 years	
San Marino	0	multiple	5 years	May also enter without a visa, with ESTA.
São Tomé and Príncipe	0	1	3 months	
Saudi Arabia	0	multiple	10 years	
Senegal	0	1	3 months	
Serbia	0	multiple	10 years	
Seychelles	0	multiple	10 years	
Sierra Leone	0	1	3 months	
Singapore	0	multiple	10 years	May also enter without a visa, with ESTA.
Slovakia	0	multiple	10 years	May also enter without a visa, with ESTA.
Slovenia	0	multiple	10 years	May also enter without a visa, with ESTA.
Solomon Islands	0	multiple	5 years	
Somalia	0	1	3 months	
South Africa	0	multiple	10 years	
South Korea	0	multiple	10 years	May also enter without a visa, with ESTA.
South Sudan	0	1	3 months	
Spain	0	multiple	10 years	May also enter without a visa, with ESTA.
Sri Lanka	0	multiple	5 years	
Sudan	0	1	3 months	
Suriname	0	multiple	5 years	
Sweden	0	multiple	10 years	May also enter without a visa, with ESTA.
Switzerland	0	multiple	10 years	May also enter without a visa, with ESTA.
Syria	0	1	3 months	
Taiwan	0	multiple	5 years	May also enter without a visa, with ESTA.
Tajikistan	0	1	3 months	
Tanzania	0	1	3 months	
Thailand	0	multiple	10 years	
Timor-Leste	0	2	3 months	
Togo	0	1	3 months	
Tonga	0	1	3 months	
Trinidad and Tobago	0	multiple	10 years	
Tunisia	0	multiple	10 years	
Turkey	0	multiple	10 years	
Turkmenistan	330	1	3 months	
Tuvalu	0	1	1 month	For B-1 only.
Tuvalu	0	1	3 months	For B-2 only.
Uganda	0	1	3 months	
Ukraine	0	multiple	10 years	
United Arab Emirates	0	multiple	10 years	
United Kingdom	0	multiple	10 years	For British Overseas Territories citizens (BOTCs) of the Pitcairn Islands, 2 entries and validity of 3 months. BOTCs of Bermuda may also enter without a visa or ESTA. BOTCs of the British Virgin Islands, Cayman Islands and Turks and Caicos Islands may also enter without a visa if traveling directly from the territory and holding a police certificate showing no criminal record. British citizens may also enter without a visa, with ESTA.
Uruguay	0	multiple	10 years	
Uzbekistan	0	multiple	1 year	
Vanuatu	0	1	3 months	
Vatican City	0	multiple	5 years	
Venezuela	0	1	3 months	
Vietnam	0	multiple	1 year	
Yemen	0	1	3 months	
Zambia	0	1	3 months	
Zimbabwe	0	1	3 months	
Stateless	0	2	3 months	

=== Electronic Visa Update System (EVUS) ===
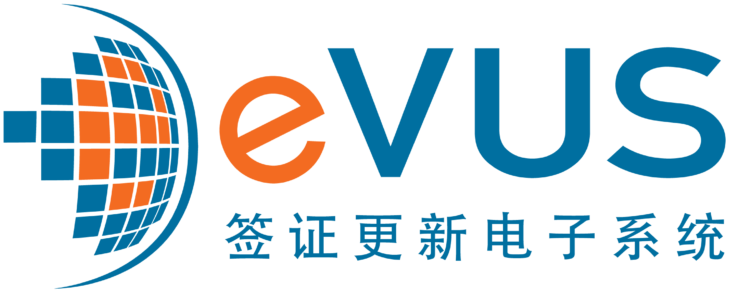
Logo of EVUS

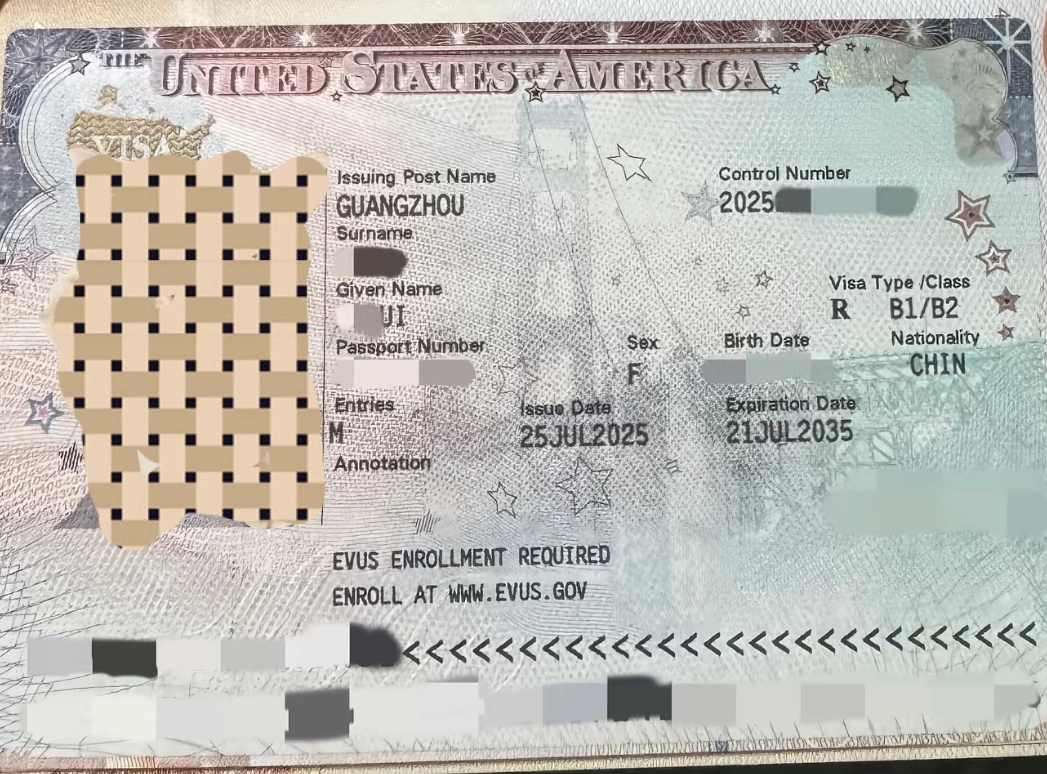
A 10-year United States B visa issued to a national of China. The annotation indicates that Electronic Visa Update System (EVUS) enrollment is needed before travel.

On March 15, 2016, U.S. Customs and Border Protection (CBP) announced that starting from 29 November 2016, all holders of Chinese passports who also hold 10-year B visas are required to enroll in the Electronic Visa Update System (EVUS, Chinese: 签证更新电子系统) before travelling to the United States via air, land or sea. EVUS is designed for visa holders to update any changes to their basic biographic and employment information at the time of their visa applications. Similar to ESTA, each EVUS enrollment is valid for multiple trips during a period of 2 years or until the holder's passport or visa expires, whichever comes first.

The requirement applies to any holder of a Chinese passport and B visa with a 10-year validity. It also applies to holders of non-citizen travel documents issued by other countries, such as a refugee travel document and certificate of identity, whose nationality is Chinese. It does not apply, however, to holders of Hong Kong SAR passports, (Note: According to some international consultants, holders of Hong Kong SAR passports are required to enroll in EVUS due to Executive Order 13936 from July 2020, but this requirement has not been confirmed by CBP.) Macau SAR passports, B visas with a validity shorter than 10 years, or of other types of visas. CBP expected that the EVUS requirement would be expanded to other nationalities in the future.

EVUS was officially launched on October 31, 2016, for early enrollments. Initially the system was free of charge. On September 30, 2025, following the One Big Beautiful Bill Act, CBP implemented an EVUS enrollment fee of $30, to be annually increased based on inflation. In October 2026, the fee was set to $31.75.

== Use for other countries ==
Certain countries generally accept a U.S. tourist visa that is valid for further travel as a substitute visa for national visas.

Country	Period	Notes
Albania	90 days	
Antigua and Barbuda	30 days	
Argentina	3 months	Certain nationalities can obtain an Electronic Travel Authorization (eTA) if holding a B2 visa.
Belize	30 days	Multiple-entry visa only
Bosnia and Herzegovina	30 days	
Canada	up to 6 months	Nationals of certain countries arriving by air with Electronic Travel Authorization (eTA) only
Chile	90 days	Nationals of China only
Colombia	90 days	Certain nationalities only
Costa Rica	30 days	Only for a multiple-entry visa that is valid for at least six months
Dominican Republic	90 days	
Dutch Caribbean	90 days	Certain nationalities only
El Salvador	90 days	Certain nationalities only
Georgia	90 days	Valid for 90 days within any 180-day period
Guatemala	90 days	Certain nationalities only
Honduras	90 days	Certain nationalities only
Jamaica	30 days	Certain nationalities only
Mexico	180 days	
Montenegro	30 days	
Nicaragua	90 days	Certain nationalities only
North Macedonia	15 days	
Oman		Certain nationalities may obtain an electronic Omani visa
Panama	30 or 180 days	Must hold a visa valid for at least 2 additional entries
Peru	180 days	Applicable to nationals of China and nationals of India only
Philippines	7 or 14 days	7 days for nationals of China; 14 days for nationals of India
Qatar	30 days	Nationals who must typically enter with a visa may obtain an electronic travel authorization
São Tomé and Príncipe	15 days	
Saudi Arabia		Nationals who must typically enter with a visa may obtain an eVisa on arrival if they travel with a Saudi Arabian airline company
Serbia	90 days	
South Korea	30 days	
Taiwan		Certain nationalities may obtain an online travel authority
Turkey		Certain nationalities may obtain an electronic visa
United Arab Emirates	14 days	Visa on arrival for nationals of India only

== Statistics ==
=== Visitor visas issued ===
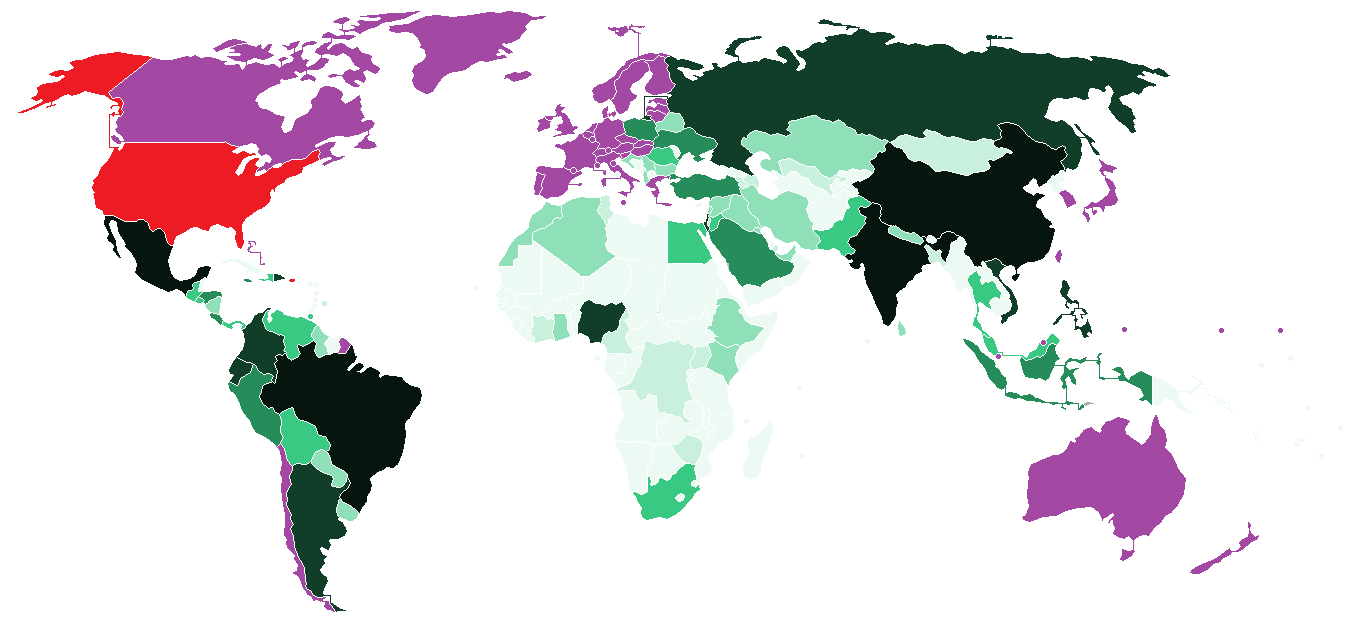
B-1/B-2 visas issued in fiscal year 2017: United States Visa-exempt nationalities >400,000 visas / 100,000–400,000 visas 50,000–100,000 visas 25,000–50,000 visas / 10,000–25,000 visas 5,000–10,000 visas <5,000 visas

The highest number of B-1/B-2 visas were issued to nationals of the following countries in fiscal years 2015, 2016, 2017 and 2023.

Country	B-1/B-2 visas issued			
Country	2023	2017	2016	2015
Mexico (Note: Including Border Crossing Cards)	1,794,962	1,088,880	1,106,723	1,234,885
Brazil	1,009,231	520,589	450,166	870,008
India	735,401	599,983	563,202	553,385
Colombia	441,223	333,433	374,398	345,233
Argentina	273,206	353,555	295,326	240,115
China	267,027	1,452,834	1,989,925	2,227,670
Ecuador	263,180	168,103	150,163	150,458
Israel	174,427	163,495	168,136	137,439
Philippines	134,907	115,712	99,967	83,139
Dominican Republic	115,762	194,557	136,057	85,140
Vietnam	110,141	100,423	86,180	80,936
Turkey	103,225	74,312	85,560	78,118
Nigeria	97,041	155,940	162,996	136,409
Egypt	92,998	54,216	58,062	46,433
Pakistan	92,618	48,537	65,844	62,714
Peru	90,808	82,485	79,927	97,936
Costa Rica	76,003	75,529	71,710	58,139
Honduras	73,624	54,753	48,177	35,004
Indonesia	67,801	52,233	48,787	48,239
Guatemala	73,216	41,055	52,326	48,735
Jamaica	61,088	65,119	94,458	83,483
Saudi Arabia	58,436	52,476	78,042	85,303
Russia	54,114	164,944	151,692	122,147
South Africa	52,112	46,427	45,240	48,432
Venezuela	50,827	47,087	144,283	223,854
Total	5,902,426	6,276,851	7,988,520	8,403,683

In fiscal year 2014, most reasons to refuse a visa were cited as "failure to establish entitlement to nonimmigrant status", "incompatible application" (most overcome), "unlawful presence", "misrepresentation", "criminal convictions", "smugglers" and "controlled substance violators". Smaller number of applications were rejected for "physical or mental disorder", "prostitution", "espionage", "terrorist activities", "falsely claiming citizenship" and other grounds for refusal including "presidential proclamation", "money laundering", "communicable disease" and "commission of acts of torture or extrajudicial killings".

=== Adjusted visa refusal rate ===
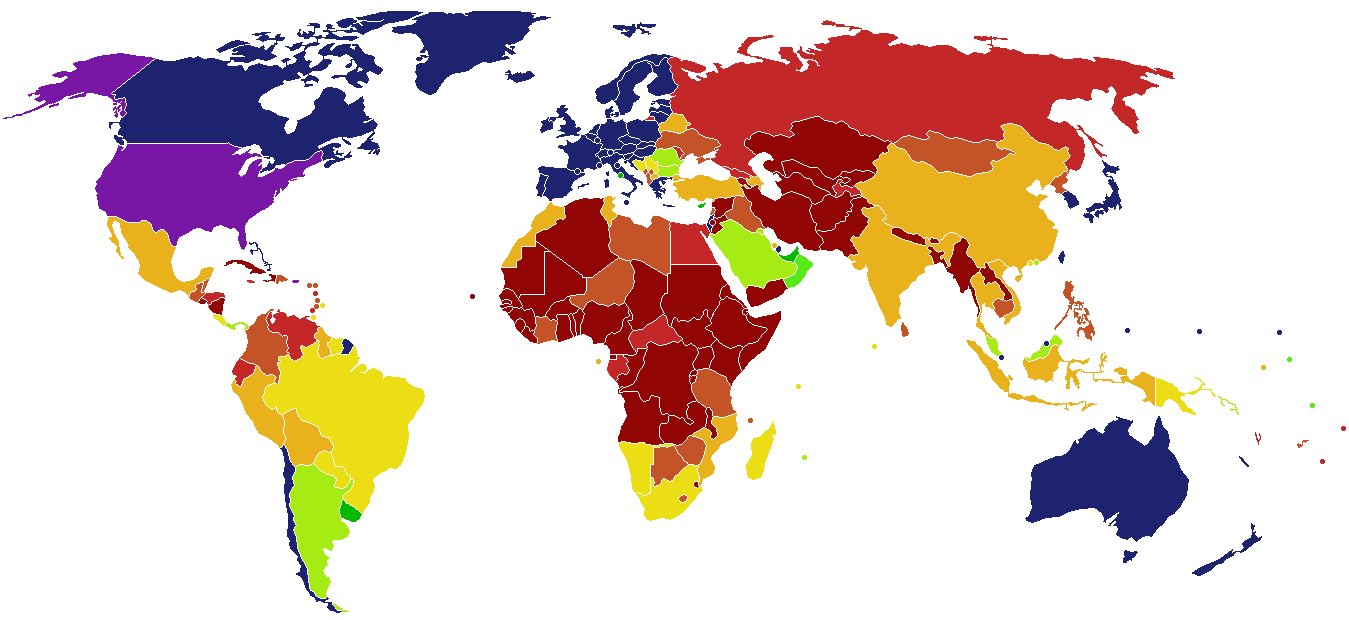
US B visa refusal rate in fiscal year 2025: <3% 3–5% 5–10% 10–20% / 20–30% 30–40% 40–50% >50% / United States Visa-exempt countries No B visa applications

The adjusted visa refusal rates for B visas, by fiscal year, were as follows.

Country	2008	2014	2015	2016	2017	2018	2019
Afghanistan	51.00%	46.70%	61.03%	73.80%	72.14%	71.39%	68.42%
Albania	38.70%	39.80%	36.82%	35.95%	40.45%	41.92%	41.45%
Algeria	20.30%	23.10%	25.92%	36.00%	43.96%	39.26%	44.22%
Angola	17.10%	21.40%	26.77%	48.52%	36.01%	51.76%	58.26%
Antigua and Barbuda	21.70%	20.80%	20.17%	22.11%	20.50%	19.07%	15.25%
Argentina	3.10%	1.40%	2.14%	2.14%	1.79%	1.73%	2.07%
Armenia	53.30%	43.80%	47.17%	45.88%	51.87%	53.83%	51.65%
Azerbaijan	14.00%	13.50%	12.93%	14.83%	27.63%	28.45%	25.43%
Bahrain	6.60%	4.70%	3.81%	6.26%	9.53%	6.96%	13.55%
Bangladesh	48.20%	50.80%	59.96%	62.82%	60.88%	40.05%	39.78%
Barbados	10.10%	9.80%	9.54%	11.24%	8.72%	7.07%	6.76%
Belarus	21.10%	14.00%	12.53%	14.87%	21.69%	23.26%	21.93%
Belize	25.40%	16.40%	30.47%	35.21%	30.91%	34.55%	28.63%
Benin	39.10%	31.40%	35.74%	38.01%	42.10%	47.74%	48.48%
Bhutan	48.30%	43.60%	54.55%	69.78%	52.43%	59.63%	57.13%
Bolivia	23.60%	13.60%	13.56%	14.36%	18.08%	22.19%	24.17%
Bosnia-Herzegovina	21.30%	16.10%	20.38%	19.70%	16.37%	23.50%	25.27%
Botswana	15.60%	16.90%	16.67%	18.97%	17.94%	18.67%	17.54%
Brazil	5.50%	3.20%	5.36%	16.70%	12.34%	12.73%	18.48%
Bulgaria	13.30%	15.20%	17.26%	16.86%	14.97%	11.32%	9.75%
Burkina Faso	44.40%	37.40%	50.37%	65.35%	75.74%	71.16%	62.32%
Burundi	58.80%	50.00%	58.35%	61.33%	75.55%	74.39%	73.16%
Cambodia	44.30%	39.90%	48.41%	35.62%	41.05%	54.22%	33.65%
Cameroon	46.70%	28.20%	29.89%	36.84%	47.29%	32.63%	57.97%
Cape Verde	42.70%	28.70%	36.05%	45.89%	50.70%	52.27%	52.66%
Central African Republic	39.60%	46.60%	32.43%	35.12%	44.24%	36.03%	37.45%
Chad	41.40%	32.40%	33.87%	42.53%	51.65%	60.80%	70.16%
China	18.20%	9.00%	10.03%	12.35%	14.57%	17.00%	18.22%
Colombia	25.60%	12.30%	15.52%	17.79%	21.93%	35.11%	41.93%
Comoros	14.00%	17.00%	54.44%	53.73%	48.45%	69.46%	53.02%
Congo	33.20%	35.40%	40.77%	46.55%	48.47%	52.23%	60.49%
Costa Rica	21.20%	11.40%	9.83%	8.39%	6.49%	9.91%	18.66%
Croatia	5.10%	6.10%	5.29%	6.78%	5.10%	5.92%	4.02%
Cuba	45.20%	66.20%	76.03%	81.85%	77.17%	50.97%	53.40%
Cyprus	1.70%	3.50%	3.53%	2.03%	1.69%	2.38%	2.78%
Democratic Republic of the Congo	36.20%	39.10%	45.62%	45.63%	49.94%	50.56%	53.80%
Djibouti	42.50%	50.10%	52.00%	47.09%	74.80%	82.96%	85.35%
Dominica	29.50%	29.00%	33.33%	31.63%	28.74%	37.13%	26.83%
Dominican Republic	45.60%	35.90%	33.78%	31.88%	35.78%	49.54%	53.21%
Ecuador	40.00%	20.80%	31.34%	29.18%	27.95%	31.38%	34.05%
Egypt	35.30%	34.00%	33.57%	28.61%	34.24%	32.15%	31.83%
El Salvador	45.70%	36.30%	45.72%	57.12%	52.97%	51.49%	58.18%
Equatorial Guinea	11.10%	17.80%	19.30%	17.75%	18.21%	21.29%	27.79%
Eritrea	51.10%	41.70%	55.67%	50.49%	71.69%	69.54%	65.39%
Eswatini	13.00%	10.00%	12.95%	8.03%	12.59%	8.49%	5.73%
Ethiopia	46.70%	44.90%	48.32%	38.13%	50.30%	41.74%	45.46%
Fiji	38.00%	14.00%	14.92%	20.23%	26.59%	41.74%	38.96%
Gabon	23.00%	13.50%	15.74%	21.29%	26.10%	40.00%	45.41%
Gambia	55.70%	69.30%	75.64%	69.87%	70.27%	64.22%	72.30%
Georgia	46.60%	48.20%	50.58%	62.82%	61.09%	62.35%	63.85%
Ghana	50.10%	59.80%	63.28%	65.70%	56.18%	49.35%	55.60%
Grenada	29.90%	29.50%	32.00%	35.71%	26.94%	26.44%	19.49%
Guatemala	33.80%	35.90%	45.37%	48.68%	47.14%	53.62%	58.64%
Guinea	63.80%	47.80%	59.81%	63.53%	64.59%	66.16%	73.29%
Guinea-Bissau	63.40%	56.50%	65.18%	71.88%	71.61%	76.09%	65.33%
Guyana	56.60%	40.20%	37.28%	25.76%	37.92%	70.62%	62.96%
Haiti	54.40%	58.20%	60.45%	64.52%	71.44%	67.59%	60.81%
Honduras	33.60%	36.80%	39.73%	42.76%	40.35%	60.32%	61.71%
Hong Kong	3.30%	3.10%	4.36%	4.61%	3.45%	4.25%	3.23%
India	24.70%	19.80%	23.78%	26.02%	23.29%	26.07%	27.75%
Indonesia	37.00%	8.30%	8.71%	11.19%	10.99%	12.81%	12.46%
Iran	42.50%	41.80%	38.55%	45.02%	58.66%	87.66%	86.58%
Iraq	46.30%	41.40%	52.82%	51.71%	60.71%	56.95%	49.94%
Israel	3.00%	8.20%	3.85%	4.09%	4.88%	5.10%	5.33%
Ivory Coast	40.90%	29.80%	28.59%	37.38%	33.72%	33.81%	35.73%
Jamaica	35.50%	32.30%	37.62%	35.64%	46.78%	54.46%	56.59%
Jordan	43.20%	26.90%	37.59%	40.34%	40.06%	42.62%	45.26%
Kazakhstan	11.70%	9.90%	12.70%	27.55%	32.81%	39.38%	42.58%
Kenya	35.60%	27.30%	27.34%	26.60%	33.17%	41.59%	49.86%
Kiribati	26.20%	15.40%	16.05%	5.81%	5.13%	25.33%	11.69%
Kosovo	47.90%	38.10%	44.03%	41.48%	37.92%	35.97%	36.76%
Kuwait	6.50%	5.70%	5.73%	4.56%	8.32%	2.71%	3.27%
Kyrgyzstan	32.10%	43.20%	55.75%	51.68%	55.58%	58.9%	67.75%
Laos	73.40%	61.10%	66.68%	62.37%	63.66%	64.06%	65.60%
Lebanon	27.90%	16.10%	27.10%	25.41%	31.75%	25.22%	23.85%
Lesotho	32.10%	16.70%	13.95%	21.20%	35.97%	21.94%	28.24%
Liberia	70.70%	49.40%	62.45%	70.23%	64.98%	64.36%	73.93%
Libya	27.10%	33.90%	43.02%	40.58%	45.50%	73.73%	89.05%
Madagascar	11.90%	11.60%	11.01%	12.12%	11.00%	11.77%	7.69%
Malawi	28.90%	12.30%	10.23%	14.52%	26.49%	28.20%	37.05%
Malaysia	5.60%	4.60%	3.34%	3.65%	3.93%	4.94%	4.91%
Maldives	4.70%	6.70%	15.49%	47.56%	27.74%	9.88%	33.65%
Mali	48.10%	54.00%	52.77%	57.58%	59.43%	50.60%	55.89%
Mauritania	51.00%	52.20%	61.45%	71.45%	67.30%	61.58%	67.79%
Mauritius	11.60%	2.20%	5.71%	5.53%	8.29%	6.49%	6.59%
Mexico	11.40%	15.60%	20.17%	23.49%	22.50%	24.93%	26.66%
Moldova	36.70%	40.10%	41.83%	36.35%	49.12%	61.10%	58.03%
Mongolia	53.60%	27.90%	34.76%	43.63%	53.62%	56.51%	54.60%
Montenegro	25.60%	28.00%	31.26%	28.69%	26.41%	35.35%	39.10%
Morocco	24.00%	21.90%	20.60%	26.77%	36.99%	42.88%	28.48%
Mozambique	13.80%	4.00%	4.03%	10.29%	26.18%	10.22%	14.24%
Myanmar	41.90%	15.50%	16.32%	13.02%	17.88%	23.12%	30.91%
Namibia	6.80%	7.60%	7.43%	5.56%	6.31%	8.40%	6.60%
Nauru	66.70%	42.90%	5.26%	13.33%	20.97%	21.43%	20.83%
Nepal	51.20%	38.20%	42.19%	49.54%	46.42%	51.53%	50.70%
Nicaragua	41.80%	35.80%	41.19%	44.54%	43.28%	46.75%	63.52%
Niger	55.70%	36.40%	31.10%	31.14%	30.65%	43.33%	42.76%
Nigeria	36.00%	33.20%	32.56%	41.44%	44.95%	57.47%	67.20%
Non-nationality based issuances (Note: "Non-nationality based issuances" includes individuals presenting travel documents issued by a competent authority other than their country of nationality, including, for example, aliens traveling on a Laissez-Passer issued by the United Nations and refugees residing in another country.)	n/a	n/a	n/a	28.92%	35.61%	40.27%	43.16%
North Korea	16.30%	55.60%	47.67%	15.00%	54.55%	100.00%	100%
North Macedonia	33.50%	29.80%	36.08%	33.84%	28.69%	31.29%	36.19%
Oman	2.20%	2.10%	2.00%	1.93%	3.46%	4.87%	5.13%
Pakistan	46.30%	38.00%	40.40%	46.43%	49.40%	47.89%	48.26%
Palestine	55.60%	36.70%	42.68%	40.64%	50.98%	53.87%	52.92%
Panama	19.20%	10.00%	11.36%	12.05%	11.61%	11.71%	18.93%
Papua New Guinea	3.40%	7.40%	5.14%	10.56%	9.34%	6.84%	1.74%
Paraguay	14.40%	6.10%	6.15%	7.47%	6.83%	8.02%	12.41%
Peru	37.70%	13.80%	14.46%	28.61%	25.97%	28.53%	25.39%
Philippines	31.00%	24.60%	27.96%	27.29%	25.54%	27.07%	24.40%
Poland	13.80%	6.40%	6.37%	5.37%	5.92%	3.99%	2.76%
Qatar	4.90%	2.10%	2.97%	3.50%	7.48%	8.34%	10.33%
Romania	25.00%	9.80%	11.16%	11.43%	11.76%	10.44%	9.11%
Russia	7.50%	7.80%	10.24%	9.29%	11.61%	14.89%	15.19%
Rwanda	50.30%	51.10%	49.17%	43.79%	52.17%	44.51%	53.76%
Saint Kitts and Nevis	25.00%	27.50%	26.60%	28.31%	26.66%	24.98%	21.87%
Saint Lucia	26.60%	27.60%	26.90%	27.16%	22.34%	21.90%	16.75%
Saint Vincent and the Grenadines	26.40%	24.10%	27.15%	27.46%	20.38%	19.17%	14.55%
Samoa	32.40%	27.20%	29.99%	28.44%	40.32%	26.26%	27.02%
São Tomé and Príncipe	28.60%	10.70%	5.71%	24.14%	14.81%	26.09%	34.78%
Saudi Arabia	6.60%	3.30%	3.24%	4.04%	5.26%	7.47%	6.82%
Senegal	55.20%	57.50%	54.37%	52.46%	56.85%	59.18%	55.88%
Serbia	11.70%	16.00%	16.54%	18.77%	22.33%	25.93%	30.33%
Seychelles	18.00%	6.80%	7.26%	9.66%	13.14%	11.64%	10.60%
Sierra Leone	50.10%	51.90%	53.02%	61.25%	47.30%	60.56%	57.99%
Solomon Islands	6.50%	5.40%	7.26%	4.28%	16.79%	3.57%	2.20%
Somalia	54.00%	52.00%	64.60%	63.89%	75.50%	90.16%	80.77%
South Africa	4.60%	2.60%	5.08%	6.83%	6.44%	7.31%	6.92%
South Sudan	n/a	43.80%	41.77%	43.89%	47.52%	41.29%	52.32%
Sri Lanka	31.40%	19.50%	22.07%	21.69%	26.19%	33.61%	35.12%
Sudan	38.60%	42.40%	40.45%	36.59%	51.37%	59.83%	57.44%
Suriname	9.60%	13.60%	7.78%	10.86%	11.44%	8.57%	7.44%
Syria	33.10%	60.00%	63.43%	59.77%	59.11%	77.31%	74.83%
Tajikistan	32.40%	49.00%	44.44%	55.24%	51.84%	53.39%	60.97%
Tanzania	26.20%	21.30%	12.02%	23.05%	18.36%	19.87%	23.90%
Thailand	19.80%	10.20%	12.35%	17.82%	20.15%	22.17%	23.41%
Timor-Leste	16.70%	25.00%	12.68%	26.67%	7.02%	8.16%	4.23%
Togo	51.70%	35.60%	43.42%	54.39%	59.88%	59.61%	59.78%
Tonga	48.70%	25.40%	28.09%	31.58%	32.85%	51.33%	45.85%
Trinidad and Tobago	23.80%	21.20%	25.16%	22.70%	22.46%	19.28%	13.05%
Tunisia	23.90%	17.50%	19.69%	15.92%	19.53%	27.67%	24.17%
Turkey	11.20%	7.10%	13.88%	13.62%	17.86%	17.49%	19.19%
Turkmenistan	45.40%	18.60%	25.41%	32.95%	40.60%	52.93%	56.26%
Tuvalu	17.60%	27.30%	21.05%	20.00%	15.38%	34.78%	25.81%
Uganda	34.40%	37.20%	30.63%	41.53%	42.38%	42.29%	51.65%
Ukraine	30.90%	27.70%	34.03%	40.83%	34.54%	40.97%	45.06%
United Arab Emirates	10.40%	4.80%	7.10%	4.02%	5.80%	3.75%	5.56%
Uruguay	9.50%	1.80%	2.70%	3.14%	3.19%	4.11%	5.91%
Uzbekistan	61.10%	52.10%	49.59%	57.09%	50.29%	61.76%	68.06%
Vanuatu	16.70%	20.00%	10.53%	16.67%	13.51%	38.30%	41.05%
Vatican City	16.70%	7.70%	25.00%	0.00%	36.36%	0.00%	8.33%
Venezuela	25.40%	15.20%	15.57%	40.25%	42.87%	74.28%	59.53%
Vietnam	38.80%	14.30%	23.43%	29.49%	24.06%	26.20%	23.70%
Western Sahara	n/a	n/a	n/a	n/a	100.00%	0.00%	0.00%
Yemen	54.70%	44.20%	54.01%	48.85%	60.76%	82.50%	78.45%
Zambia	53.30%	22.20%	20.98%	22.26%	21.72%	22.45%	40.64%
Zimbabwe	30.30%	13.20%	21.03%	22.88%	26.32%	26.60%	26.92%

=== Visitor admissions ===
United States Number of non-immigrant admissions for tourist and business purposes into the United States in fiscal year 2025: Over 2 million Over 1 million Over 500 thousand Over 250 thousand Over 100 thousand Over 15 thousand Under 15 thousand No admissions

The individuals admitted for tourism and/or business purposes during fiscal year 2025 were nationals from the following countries.

Country	Admissions (Note: Includes admissions under the Visa Waiver Program.)
Afghanistan	4,197
Albania	29,406
Algeria	19,364
Andorra	2,712
Angola	4,789
Anguilla	2,044
Antigua and Barbuda	19,280
Argentina	789,942
Armenia	20,757
Aruba	17,447
Australia	958,574
Austria	181,373
Azerbaijan	10,141
Bahamas	304,738
Bahrain	7,110
Bangladesh	56,849
Barbados	56,431
Belarus	9,261
Belgium	260,680
Belize	37,637
Benin	2,774
Bermuda	63,825
Bhutan	889
Bolivia	66,090
Bosnia and Herzegovina	9,154
Botswana	2,150
Brazil	1,916,565
British Indian Ocean Territory	453
British Virgin Islands	16,140
Brunei	877
Bulgaria	33,756
Burkina Faso	3,151
Burundi	879
Cameroon	9,904
Canada	16,018,525
Cape Verde	4,066
Cayman Islands	47,119
Central African Republic	2,256
Chad	467
Chile	318,819
China	1,562,458
Christmas Island	63
Cocos Islands	105
Colombia	1,119,998
Comoros	104
Congo	1,563
Cook Islands	154
Costa Rica	382,382
Côte d'Ivoire	8,622
Croatia	40,864
Cuba	22,519
Curacao	12,607
Cyprus	13,021
Czech Republic	117,333
Denmark (Note: Includes Denmark and Greenland.)	180,571
Djibouti	247
Dominica	7,777
Dominican Republic	554,871
East Timor	106
Ecuador	458,799
Egypt	68,908
El Salvador	270,710
Equatorial Guinea	631
Eritrea	1,275
Estonia	21,032
Ethiopia	27,171
Falkland Islands	180
Faroe Islands	385
Fiji	7,999
Finland	97,405
France	1,589,676
French Guiana	1,607
French Polynesia	10,337
Gabon	1,600
Gambia	1,567
Georgia	14,675
Germany	1,770,112
Ghana	40,045
Gibraltar	1,495
Greece	93,030
Grenada	15,423
Guadeloupe	7,116
Guatemala	423,001
Guinea-Bissau	161
Guinea	4,041
Guyana	76,559
Haiti	28,135
Heard Island and McDonald Islands	47
Honduras	332,541
Hong Kong	86,692
Hungary	90,229
Iceland	44,914
India	2,060,726
Indonesia	79,616
Iran	8,577
Iraq	16,075
Ireland	490,632
Israel	482,305
Italy	1,182,877
Jamaica	274,627
Japan	1,967,298
Jordan	30,720
Kampuchea	9,188
Kazakhstan	37,480
Kenya	29,420
Kiribati	180
Kosovo	0
Kuwait	30,431
Kyrgyzstan	11,352
Laos	350
Latvia	22,257
Lebanon	24,459
Lesotho	279
Liberia	1,440
Libya	1,823
Liechtenstein	1,821
Lithuania	40,243
Luxembourg	20,243
Macau	3,409
Macedonia	10,281
Madagascar	1,617
Malawi	1,872
Malaysia	64,167
Maldives	353
Mali	3,430
Malta	10,359
Marshall Islands	173
Martinique	4,708
Mauritania	731
Mauritius	4,317
Mayotte	134
Mexico	17,980,030
Micronesia	587
Moldova	8,304
Monaco	3,397
Mongolia	22,180
Montenegro	6,286
Montserrat	257
Morocco	40,359
Mozambique	1,551
Myanmar	3,189
Namibia	2,168
Nauru	96
Nepal	38,134
Netherlands Antilles	2,110
Netherlands	572,389
New Caledonia	973
New Zealand	230,074
Nicaragua	60,233
Niger	1,236
Nigeria	107,316
Niue	22
North Korea	974
Norway	159,145
Oman	6,364
Pakistan	127,979
Palau	270
Palestine	8,001
Panama	181,524
Papua New Guinea	939
Paraguay	29,625
Peru	372,986
Philippines	315,352
Pitcairn Islands	108
Poland	383,177
Portugal	178,394
Qatar	25,952
Reunion	1,966
Romania	96,475
Russia	92,749
Rwanda	5,321
Saint Barthelemy	499
Saint Helena	50
Saint Martin	5,674
Saint Pierre and Miquelon	132
San Marino	788
São Tomé and Príncipe	63
Saudi Arabia	96,449
Senegal	8,956
Serbia	34,473
Seychelles	352
Sierra Leone	3,108
Singapore	147,934
Sint Maarten	0
Slovakia	48,455
Slovenia	27,533
Solomon Islands	188
Somalia	271
South Africa	108,707
South Korea	1,647,142
Spain	910,525
Sri Lanka	19,166
St. Kitts and Nevis	14,497
St. Lucia	17,259
St. Vincent and the Grenadines	11,189
Sudan	1,218
Suriname	15,973
Swaziland	1,559
Sweden	283,367
Switzerland	361,216
Syria	3,842
Taiwan	427,470
Tajikistan	1,980
Tanzania	6,840
Thailand	77,927
Togo	2,773
Tonga	2,390
Trinidad and Tobago	189,504
Tunisia	13,671
Turkey	204,346
Turkmenistan	1,177
Turks and Caicos Islands	16,329
Tuvalu	66
Uganda	9,692
Ukraine	87,922
United Arab Emirates	95,628
United Kingdom	4,058,124
Uruguay	67,995
Uzbekistan	10,369
Vanuatu	318
Vatican City	155
Venezuela	165,589
Vietnam	127,056
Wallis and Futuna	140
Western Sahara	29
Western Samoa	2,115
Yemen	1,721
Yugoslavia	85
Zaire	10,127
Zambia	3,860
Zimbabwe	10,194
Total	68,287,793

=== Overstays ===
The table below shows the number of visitors who overstay the maximum period of allowed stay on their B-1/B-2 status after entering the U.S. The Department of Homeland Security publishes annual reports that list the number of violations by passengers who arrive by air and sea. The table below excludes statistics on persons who left the United States later than their allowed stay or legalized their status and shows only suspected overstays who remained in the country. More than 95% of visitors from Mexico arrive in the U.S. by land rather than by air and sea. Statistics for suspected overstays of the land visitors are yet to be released.

The number of suspected in-country B-1/B-2 overstays in fiscal year 2018 by nationality were the following.

Country	Expected departures	Out-of-country overstays	Suspected in- country overstays	Total overstays	Total overstay rate	Suspected in-country overstay rate
Afghanistan	1,339	4	169	173	12.92%	12.62%
Albania	15,319	56	562	618	4.03%	3.67%
Algeria	11,126	43	278	321	2.89%	2.50%
Andorra	1,611	0	3	3	0.19%	0.19%
Angola	6,342	22	963	985	15.53%	15.18%
Antigua and Barbuda	14,508	26	202	228	1.57%	1.39%
Argentina	1,116,017	276	7,909	8,185	0.73%	0.71%
Armenia	11,315	39	482	521	4.60%	4.26%
Australia (Note: Includes Australia, Norfolk Island, Christmas Island, and Cocos Islands.)	1,418,265	829	3,155	3,984	0.28%	0.22%
Austria	210,050	74	647	721	0.34%	0.31%
Azerbaijan	6,731	27	486	513	7.62%	7.22%
Bahamas	272,487	253	1,292	1,545	0.57%	0.47%
Bahrain	6,784	9	43	52	0.77%	0.63%
Bangladesh	26,795	52	565	617	2.30%	2.11%
Barbados	64,795	39	718	757	1.17%	1.11%
Belarus	18,198	57	673	730	4.01%	3.70%
Belgium	300,319	148	785	933	0.31%	0.26%
Belize	28,642	49	554	603	2.11%	1.93%
Benin	2,079	17	97	114	5.48%	4.67%
Bhutan	398	6	46	52	13.07%	11.56%
Bolivia	69,041	73	1,108	1,181	1.71%	1.60%
Bosnia and Herzegovina	8,186	36	109	145	1.77%	1.33%
Botswana	2,095	5	26	31	1.48%	1.24%
Brazil	2,200,440	1,720	34,569	36,289	1.65%	1.57%
Brunei	1,160	0	9	9	0.78%	0.78%
Bulgaria	30,799	69	235	304	0.99%	0.76%
Burkina Faso	3,953	24	308	332	8.40%	7.79%
Burundi	1,157	0	249	249	21.52%	21.52%
Cambodia	4,045	9	110	119	2.94%	2.72%
Cameroon	10,958	125	826	951	8.68%	7.54%
Central African Republic	212	2	14	16	7.55%	6.60%
Cape Verde	4,870	30	553	583	11.97%	11.36%
Chad	536	3	162	165	30.78%	30.22%
Chile	403,917	655	5,364	6,019	1.49%	1.33%
China (Note: Includes mainland China, Hong Kong, and Macau.)	2,345,850	2,575	15,739	18,314	0.78%	0.67%
Colombia	929,005	935	20,982	21,917	2.36%	2.26%
Comoros	87	0	2	2	2.30%	2.30%
Congo	1,096	5	119	124	11.31%	10.86%
Costa Rica	306,925	184	2,830	3,014	0.98%	0.92%
Croatia	26,385	24	108	132	0.50%	0.41%
Cuba	70,484	254	1,614	1,868	2.65%	2.29%
Cyprus	10,413	4	38	42	0.40%	0.36%
Czech Republic	125,142	174	612	786	0.63%	0.49%
Democratic Republic of the Congo	6,446	24	497	521	8.08%	7.71%
Denmark	340,333	114	656	770	0.23%	0.19%
Djibouti	403	3	177	180	44.67%	43.92%
Dominica	7,336	28	275	303	4.13%	3.75%
Dominican Republic	446,451	443	14,198	14,641	3.28%	3.18%
Ecuador	429,106	345	6,652	6,997	1.63%	1.55%
Egypt	74,162	183	1,848	2,031	2.74%	2.49%
El Salvador	199,915	210	3,229	3,439	1.72%	1.62%
Equatorial Guinea	1,002	9	54	63	6.29%	5.39%
Eritrea	2,041	49	491	540	26.46%	24.06%
Estonia	24,922	25	91	116	0.47%	0.37%
Eswatini	875	1	11	12	1.37%	1.26%
Ethiopia	19,150	136	843	979	5.11%	4.40%
Fiji	8,257	39	206	245	2.97%	2.49%
Finland	151,678	59	293	352	0.23%	0.19%
France (Note: Includes France, French Guiana, French Polynesia, French Southern and Antarctic Lands, Guadeloupe, Martinique, Mayotte, New Caledonia, Réunion, Saint Barthélemy, Saint Pierre and Miquelon, and Wallis and Futuna.)	1,907,233	1,103	10,427	11,530	0.60%	0.55%
Gabon	1,843	12	88	100	5.43%	4.77%
Gambia	1,747	19	129	148	8.47%	7.38%
Georgia	7,919	30	819	849	10.72%	10.34%
Germany	2,128,450	962	5,766	6,728	0.32%	0.27%
Ghana	23,486	71	804	875	3.73%	3.42%
Greece	90,919	322	825	1,147	1.26%	0.91%
Grenada	11,032	20	219	239	2.17%	1.99%
Guatemala	276,400	291	5,548	5,839	2.11%	2.01%
Guinea	2,651	19	120	139	5.24%	4.53%
Guinea-Bissau	143	0	14	14	9.79%	9.79%
Guyana	66,416	155	3,065	3,220	4.85%	4.61%
Haiti	137,119	453	6,464	6,917	5.04%	4.71%
Honduras	214,468	253	3,890	4,143	1.93%	1.81%
Hungary	98,877	268	978	1,246	1.26%	0.99%
Iceland	69,723	26	123	149	0.21%	0.18%
India	1,134,436	2,216	10,770	12,986	1.14%	0.95%
Indonesia	93,250	92	827	919	0.99%	0.89%
Iran	9,149	79	234	313	3.42%	2.56%
Iraq	7,486	37	382	419	5.60%	5.10%
Ireland	558,218	218	1,487	1,705	0.31%	0.27%
Israel	418,944	375	3,251	3,626	0.87%	0.78%
Italy	1,304,020	1,063	6,009	7,072	0.54%	0.46%
Ivory Coast	6,199	29	260	289	4.66%	4.19%
Jamaica	312,667	384	10,242	10,626	3.40%	3.28%
Japan	3,122,345	372	4,505	4,877	0.16%	0.14%
Jordan	38,906	172	1,554	1,726	4.44%	3.99%
Kazakhstan	22,274	53	676	729	3.27%	3.03%
Kenya	27,559	99	1,494	1,593	5.78%	5.42%
Kiribati	115	0	1	1	0.87%	0.87%
Kosovo	244	3	7	10	4.10%	2.87%
Kuwait	38,071	410	517	927	2.43%	1.36%
Kyrgyzstan	3,316	7	99	106	3.20%	2.99%
Laos	1,508	7	144	151	10.01%	9.55%
Latvia	22,919	73	162	235	1.03%	0.71%
Lebanon	37,840	76	604	680	1.80%	1.60%
Lesotho	364	0	2	2	0.55%	0.55%
Liberia	3,372	68	392	460	13.64%	11.63%
Libya	430	4	15	19	4.42%	3.49%
Liechtenstein	1,890	2	2	4	0.21%	0.11%
Lithuania	38,341	122	384	506	1.32%	1.00%
Luxembourg	13,625	9	39	48	0.35%	0.29%
Madagascar	1,103	2	12	14	1.27%	1.09%
Malawi	2,010	7	121	128	6.37%	6.02%
Malaysia	78,865	55	866	921	1.17%	1.10%
Maldives	225	0	2	2	0.89%	0.89%
Mali	3,234	10	146	156	4.82%	4.51%
Malta	7,160	3	22	25	0.35%	0.31%
Marshall Islands	78	0	4	4	5.13%	5.13%
Mauritania	698	7	71	78	11.17%	10.17%
Mauritius	3,366	4	18	22	0.65%	0.53%
Micronesia	60	0	6	6	10.00%	10.00%
Moldova	9,887	32	257	289	2.92%	2.60%
Monaco	1,008	1	3	4	0.40%	0.30%
Mongolia	11,401	41	378	419	3.68%	3.32%
Montenegro	5,571	30	356	386	6.93%	6.39%
Morocco (Note: Includes Morocco and Western Sahara.)	26,526	75	388	463	1.75%	1.46%
Mozambique	1,820	5	30	35	1.92%	1.65%
Myanmar	7,492	31	419	450	6.01%	5.59%
Namibia	2,080	7	42	49	2.36%	2.02%
Nauru	45	1	1	2	4.44%	2.22%
Nepal	27,205	215	970	1,185	4.36%	3.57%
Netherlands (Note: Includes the Netherlands, Aruba, Bonaire, Curaçao, Saba, Sint Eustatius, and Sint Maarten.)	795,308	359	2,821	3,180	0.40%	0.35%
New Zealand (Note: Includes New Zealand, Cook Islands, Tokelau, and Niue.)	345,636	252	843	1,095	0.32%	0.24%
Nicaragua	69,133	72	1,250	1,322	1.91%	1.81%
Niger	1,138	9	75	84	7.38%	6.59%
Nigeria	195,785	719	29,004	29,723	15.18%	14.81%
North Korea	37	12	0	0	0.00%	0.00%
North Macedonia	7,891	19	121	140	1.77%	1.53%
Norway	285,524	128	520	648	0.23%	0.18%
Oman	4,342	11	26	37	0.85%	0.60%
Pakistan	88,177	163	1,917	2,080	2.36%	2.17%
Palau	34	1	6	7	20.59%	17.65%
Panama	148,294	97	831	928	0.63%	0.56%
Papua New Guinea	589	1	3	4	0.68%	0.51%
Paraguay	30,301	23	501	524	1.73%	1.65%
Peru	302,829	340	4,653	4,993	1.65%	1.54%
Philippines	304,585	620	4,993	5,613	1.84%	1.64%
Poland	211,438	215	1,635	1,850	0.87%	0.77%
Portugal	198,982	444	3,140	3,584	1.80%	1.58%
Qatar	11,645	128	154	282	2.42%	1.32%
Romania	82,670	171	720	891	1.08%	0.87%
Russia	265,798	347	4,234	4,581	1.72%	1.59%
Rwanda	3,312	16	137	153	4.62%	4.14%
Saint Kitts and Nevis	11,764	11	203	214	1.82%	1.73%
Saint Lucia	15,780	25	293	318	2.02%	1.86%
Saint Vincent and the Grenadines	9,443	15	263	278	2.94%	2.79%
Samoa	2,111	14	140	154	7.30%	6.63%
San Marino	731	0	3	3	0.41%	0.41%
São Tomé and Príncipe	30	0	1	1	3.33%	3.33%
Saudi Arabia	100,922	399	817	1,216	1.20%	0.81%
Senegal	7,848	36	280	316	4.03%	3.57%
Serbia	29,173	67	304	371	1.27%	1.04%
Seychelles	337	0	2	2	0.59%	0.59%
Sierra Leone	2,893	20	191	211	7.29%	6.60%
Singapore	134,505	97	205	302	0.22%	0.15%
Slovakia	54,438	102	406	508	0.93%	0.75%
Slovenia	27,559	21	86	107	0.39%	0.31%
Solomon Islands	169	0	3	3	1.78%	1.78%
Somalia	78	1	9	10	12.82%	11.54%
South Africa	126,668	129	848	977	0.77%	0.67%
South Korea	1,579,221	1,027	3,524	4,551	0.29%	0.22%
South Sudan	239	0	36	36	15.06%	15.06%
Spain	1,050,622	1,564	10,208	11,772	1.12%	0.97%
Sri Lanka	20,997	18	286	304	1.45%	1.36%
Sudan	2,937	29	339	368	12.53%	11.54%
Suriname	12,711	17	175	192	1.51%	1.38%
Sweden	541,849	244	1,168	1,412	0.26%	0.22%
Switzerland	409,632	190	1,032	1,222	0.30	0.25%
Syria	6,851	27	1,180	1,207	17.62%	17.22%
Taiwan	428,767	541	1,214	1,755	0.41%	0.28%
Tajikistan	1,377	19	81	100	7.26%	5.88%
Tanzania	5,892	33	171	204	3.46%	2.90%
Thailand	90,436	148	1,491	1,639	1.81%	1.65%
Timor-Leste	61	0	0	0	0.00%	0.00%
Togo	2,173	15	170	185	8.51%	7.82%
Tonga	3,422	17	143	160	4.68%	4.18%
Trinidad and Tobago	180,415	83	728	811	0.45%	0.40%
Tunisia	9,175	26	188	214	2.33%	2.05%
Turkey	165,724	280	2,804	3,084	1.86%	1.69%
Turkmenistan	1,044	3	92	95	9.10%	8.81%
Tuvalu	38	0	1	1	2.63%	2.63%
Uganda	9,247	30	768	798	8.63%	8.31%
Ukraine	92,766	178	2,047	2,225	2.40%	2.21%
United Arab Emirates	28,772	325	383	708	2.46%	1.33%
United Kingdom (Note: Includes the United Kingdom, Anguilla, Bermuda, British Virgin Islands, Cayman Islands, Falkland Islands, Gibraltar, Guernsey, Isle of Man, Jersey, Montserrat, Pitcairn Islands, Saint Helena, and Turks and Caicos Islands.)	4,745,902	1,982	12,233	14,215	0.30%	0.26%
Uruguay	83,279	40	1,397	1,437	1.73%	1.68%
Uzbekistan	10,972	66	667	733	6.68%	6.08%
Vanuatu	98	0	0	0	0.00%	0.00%
Vatican City	31	0	0	0	0.00%	0.00%
Venezuela	477,224	1,029	34,902	35,931	7.53%	7.31%
Vietnam	97,433	366	1,750	2,116	2.17%	1.80%
Yemen	1,816	11	507	518	28.52%	27.92%
Zambia	4,013	15	219	234	5.83%	5.46%
Zimbabwe	7,560	23	192	215	2.84%	2.54%
Total	38,198,294	34,530	364,020	398,550	1.04%	0.95%

== See also ==
- Visa policy of the United States
- Permanent Resident Card (Green Card)
- B visa in lieu of other visas
