= Continuous Discharge Certificate =

Seafarer's identity document

A Continuous Certificate of Discharge or Continuous Discharge Certificate (C.D.C.) is a seafarer's identity document issued by their country. This document certifies that the person holding this is a seafarer as per the International Convention on Standards of Training, Certification and Watchkeeping for Seafarers (STCW), 1978, as amended 2010. Every seafarer must carry this document while on board, which is also an official and legal record of their sea experience. The master of the vessel signs the document each time a seafarer is signed off from the vessel certifying their experience on board.

A C.D.C. granted under STCW rules is valid for five years and may be renewed on expiration or within six months prior to date of expiration, on a request from the holder, for a further period up to five years at a time if the holder is a serving seafarer and their C.D.C. has not been cancelled, withdrawn or suspended under these rules. If the period of validity of CDC of a seafarer expires during the voyage, it is valid until the end of the voyage. Every person who works on a merchant ship needs a CDC: deck cadets, engine cadets, GP Ratings, trainee Electro Technical Officers, cooks, stewards and later all officers.

== See also ==
- Seaman Service Book
- Merchant Mariner Credential
- Merchant Mariner's Document
