= Ordinary seaman =

Type of sailor

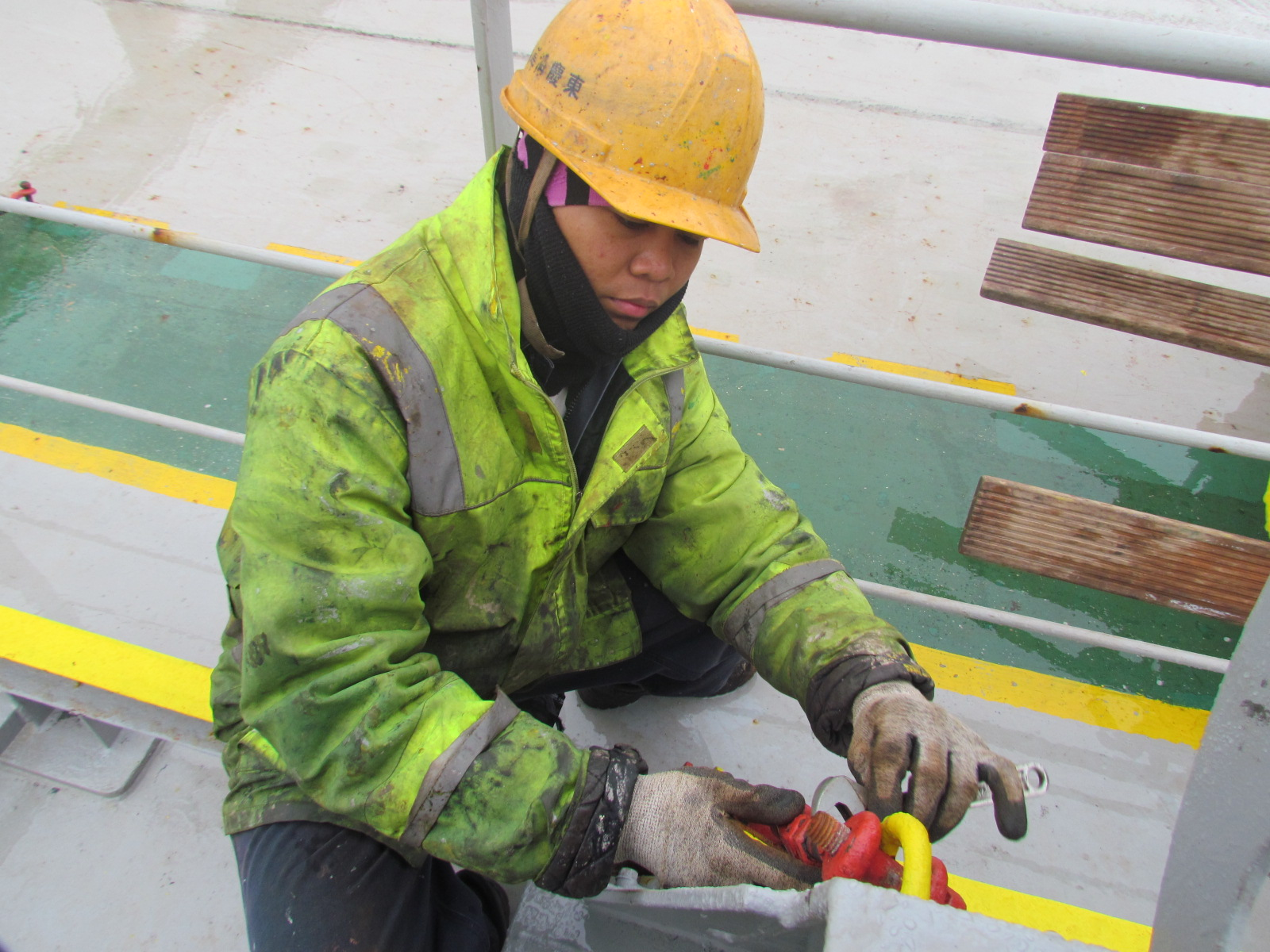

General
- Other names: Ordinary Rate
- Department: Deck department
- Reports to: Boatswain, chief mate, mate on watch
- Duties: maintenance.
- Requirements: Merchant Mariner's Document or equivalent.

Watchstanding
- Watchstander: Yes

An ordinary seaman (OS) is a member of the deck department of a ship. The position is an apprenticeship to become an able seaman, and has been for centuries. In modern times, an OS is required to work on a ship for a specific amount of time, gaining what is referred to as "sea time". For centuries, the term ordinary seaman was used to refer to a seaman with between one and two years' experience at sea, who showed enough seamanship to be so rated by their captain. Historically, in some navies and the merchant marine, a sailor with less experience was called a landsman.

An OS is generally not required to stand watch, but must pass examinations on watchstanding skills such as performing lookout duty and being a helmsman. Thus an OS will often be found on a ship's bridge after working hours taking a turn at the ship's wheel or being familiarized with bridge equipment.

During the apprenticeship, an OS performs a variety of duties concerned with the operation and upkeep of deck department areas and equipment. These duties vary with the type of ship, the type of voyage, the number of crewmembers, the weather, the supervisor, and any number of other variables. However, in most cases, one can expect an ordinary seaman to clean, to perform maintenance, to work with deck equipment, and to undergo on-the-job-training under the supervision of senior deck department members.

== Duties ==
As an ordinary seaman, one's duties may include the following:

Typical ordinary seaman duties
Illustration	Description
	Scale, buff, and paint decks and superstructure. A ship's metal structure is under constant attack from the corrosive properties of seawater. Members of a ship's deck department spend a good deal of time identifying and removing rust accumulations, and refinishing affected areas with sealants, primers, and paints to slow the oxidation process.
	Sweep and wash deck. Excess water and salt on deck can lead to slipping hazards as well as accelerated rusting of the deck and equipment affixed to it. Ordinary seamen often bear the brunt of the swabbing duties, and many look forward to earning their able seaman's ticket and being done with swabbing.
	Splice wire and rope. A proficiency at splicing, knotting, and marlinspike seamanship have identified able seamen for centuries. In the modern merchant fleets, a proficiency for this sort of work is a requirement for certification as an able seaman. Thus, during the period of apprenticeship, it is customary for the crew to challenge an ordinary seaman, and call upon the OS to demonstrate these marlinspike seamanship skills at regular intervals, under the guidance of senior members of the deck department.
	Break out, rig, overhaul, and stow cargo-handling gear, stationary rigging, and running gear. Depending on the type of ship, it may undergo routine cargo onloads and offloads. On container ships and roll-on roll-off ships, this requires the staging of large amounts of equipment, such as twist-locks, braces, ratchet-straps, tie-down rods, and so forth. These are generally kept in storage during a voyage, so that they won't get thrown by the ship's movement. Thus, the ordinary seaman is often called upon to move this sort of equipment from storage areas to cargo areas.
	Secure cargo. Cargo must be secured, or fastened to the ship, when it is brought on board. Depending on the type of ship and the type of cargo, this process may be nearly automatic or a very customized operation. During a voyage, cargo is regularly checked to look for wear and tear, broken or compromised securements, shifting, or any other sort of noncompliance. If irregularities are found, the deck crew must respond by resecuring the cargo. Finally, near the end of the voyage, securements may be exercised or loosened to avoid problems with discharge.
	Launch and recover boats. One of the proficiencies that must be demonstrated to pass the examination for able seaman is a proficiency in all aspects of work with lifeboats. International regulations require merchant ships to run regular lifeboat drills, and the ordinary seaman is customarily given a variety of duties during these drills to become familiar and comfortable with launching, commanding, and retrieving a lifeboat.

On specialized vessels, an OS may have unique duties. For example, on research vessels, an OS may rig and operate hydrographic and other specialty winches; handle and stow oceanographic explosives; and stage and stow beach support equipment.

== Advancement ==
=== United States ===
The next step on the career ladder for the ordinary seaman is to become an able seaman. This advancement is based on a number of factors laid out in the Code of Federal Regulations.

==== Training ====
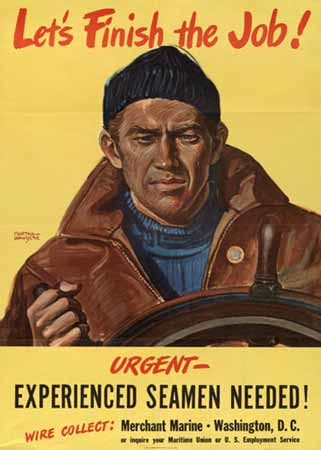
AB's were in high demand during World War II.

The Code of Federal Regulations establishes in 46 CFR 12.05 four categories of able seaman for the United States Merchant Marine:

1. Able Seaman—Any Waters, Unlimited. Requires three years service on deck on vessels operating on the oceans or the Great Lakes.
2. Able Seaman—Limited. Requires 18 months service on deck in vessels of 100 gross tons or more which operate in a service not exclusively confined to the rivers and smaller inland lakes of the United States.
3. Able Seaman—Special. Requires 12 months service on deck on vessels operating on the oceans, or the navigable waters of the United States including the Great Lakes.
4. Able Seaman—Special (OSV). Requires six months service on deck on vessels operating on the oceans, or the navigable waters of the United States including the Great Lakes.

Time served in certain training programs and school ships may be substituted for the time of service listed above. Special certificates of service are available for Able Seaman, Great Lakes—18 months service; Able Seaman, Any waters—12 months; Able Seaman, Tugs and towboats—any waters; Able Seaman, Bays and sounds—12 months, vessels 500 gross tons or less not carrying passengers; and Able Seaman, Seagoing barges—12 months.

==== Examination requirements ====
For the United States Merchant Marine, the Code of Federal Regulations establishes in 46 CFR 12.05 examination requirements for the certification of able seamen, which includes:

- Competence as a lifeboatman, including showing:
1. training in all the operations connected with the launching of lifeboats and life-rafts, and in the use of oars;
2. acquaintance with the practical handling of boats; including the ability to command the boat's crew.
- An examination, conducted only in English, consisting of questions regarding:
1. lifeboats and life-rafts, the names of their essential parts, and a description of the required equipment;
2. the clearing away, swinging out and lowering of lifeboats and life-rafts, and handling of lifeboats under oars and sails, including questions relative to the proper handling of a boat in a heavy sea;
3. the operation and functions of commonly used types of davits;
4. knowledge of nautical terms; boxing the compass, either by degrees or points; running lights, passing signals, and fog signals for vessels on the high seas, in inland waters, or on the Great Lakes depending upon the waters on which the applicant has served; and distress signals; and,
5. knowledge of proper response to commands for handling the wheel and knowledge of the use of engine room telegraph or bell-pull signals.
- In the actual demonstration, the applicant shall show ability by taking command of a boat and directing the operation of clearing away, swinging out, lowering the boat into the water, and acting as coxswain in charge of the boat under oars. The AB shall demonstrate ability to row by pulling an oar in the boat. The applicant shall also demonstrate knowledge of the principal knots, bends, splices, and hitches in common use by tying them.
- The applicant must demonstrate to the satisfaction of the Officer in Charge, Marine Inspection, knowledge of pollution laws and regulations, procedures for discharge containment and cleanup, and methods for disposal of sludge and waste material from cargo and fueling operations.

== See also ==
- Seafarer's professions and ranks
- Able Seaman (occupation)
- STCW
- Merchant Mariner's Document
