= Merchant Mariner Credential =

United States Coast Guard credential

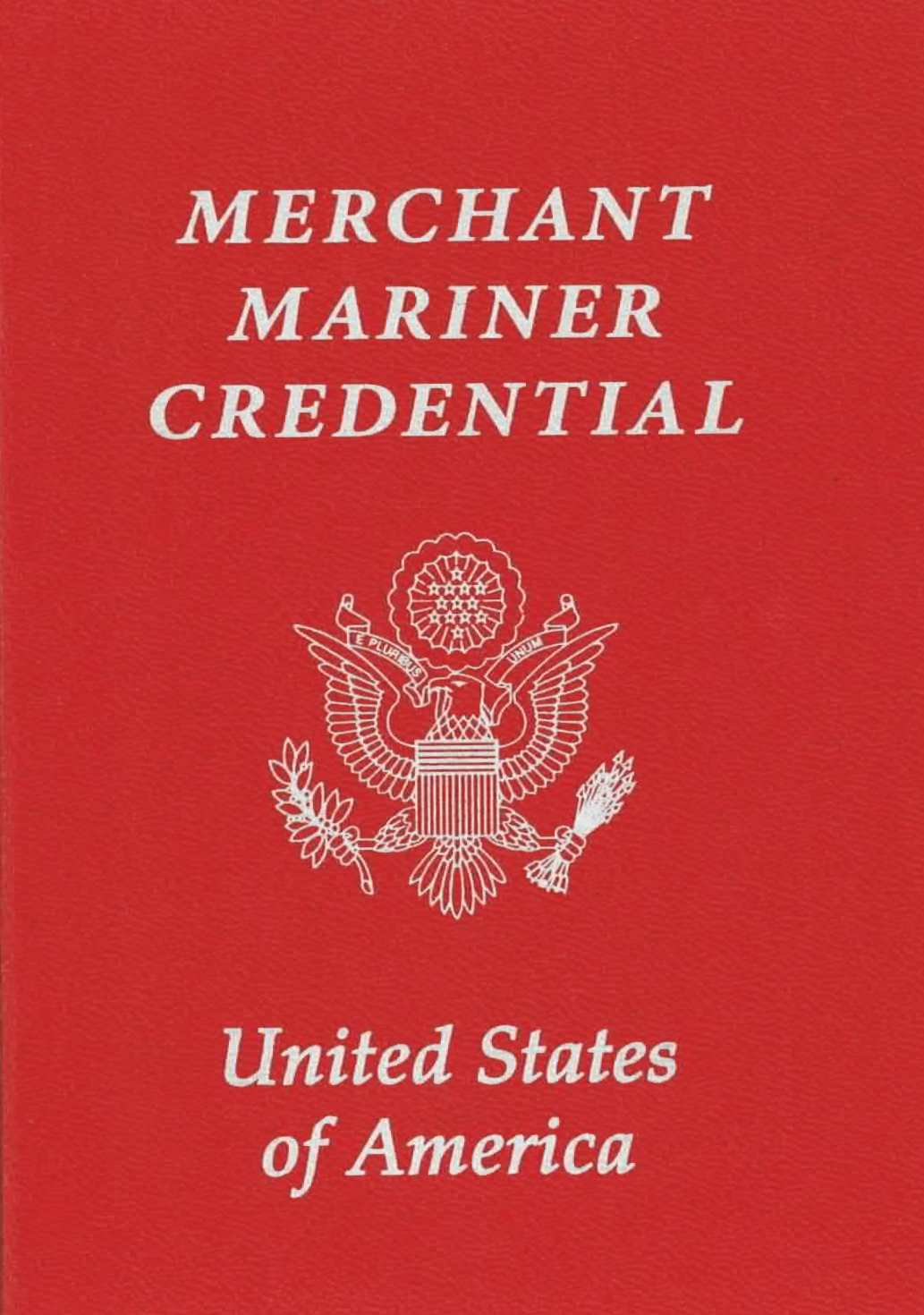
Merchant Mariner Credential

The Merchant Mariner Credential (MMC) is a credential issued by the United States Coast Guard in accordance with guidelines of the International Convention on Standards of Training, Certification and Watchkeeping for Seafarers (STCW) to United States seafarers in order to show evidence of a mariner's qualifications. It is the standard documentation required for all crew members of U.S. ships for all vessels required to operate with a licensed Master or Operator, regardless of size. The MMC replaced the Merchant Mariner's Document, merchant mariner license, Certificate of Registry, and STCW Certificate.

== Origin ==
The MMC contains professional qualification information previously listed on a merchant mariner license or Certificate of Registry as an officer endorsement, while information previously listed on a Merchant Mariner's Document is included as a rating endorsement. STCW endorsements are still listed as STCW endorsements.

The combining of the mariner credentials was due to the requirement for U.S. mariners to obtain the Transportation Worker Identification Credential (or TWIC), a biometric security card issued by the Transportation Security Administration (TSA) that all workers in the transportation industry are required to obtain if their work involves access to a security-sensitive area. This reduced the number of documents needed to satisfy manning requirements from five to two: The TWIC and MMC.

Previous to April 15, 2009, applications for credentials still had to be made in person at an REC to provide fingerprints and proof of identity. Now, TSA collects the fingerprints and proof of identity and forwards the information to the Coast Guard's National Maritime Center (NMC). Mariners still have to visit a Regional Exam Center if they are required to take an exam.

The first Merchant Mariner Credential was issued on May 7, 2009, at a meeting of the Towing Safety Advisory Committee. As of early 2015, all active U.S. merchant mariners had been issued MMCs.

The credential was criticized by several groups upon introduction. One organization said that the consolidation reduced the merchant marine officer license, a certificate of professional achievement and status, into a work permit. Another group suggested that the consolidation, together with STCW requirements, the TWIC requirement, and physical evaluation standards, stressed the skilled labor pool, posed too much of an administrative burden, and threatened mariner recruitment, training and retention.

== Physical description ==
=== Current MMC Format ===
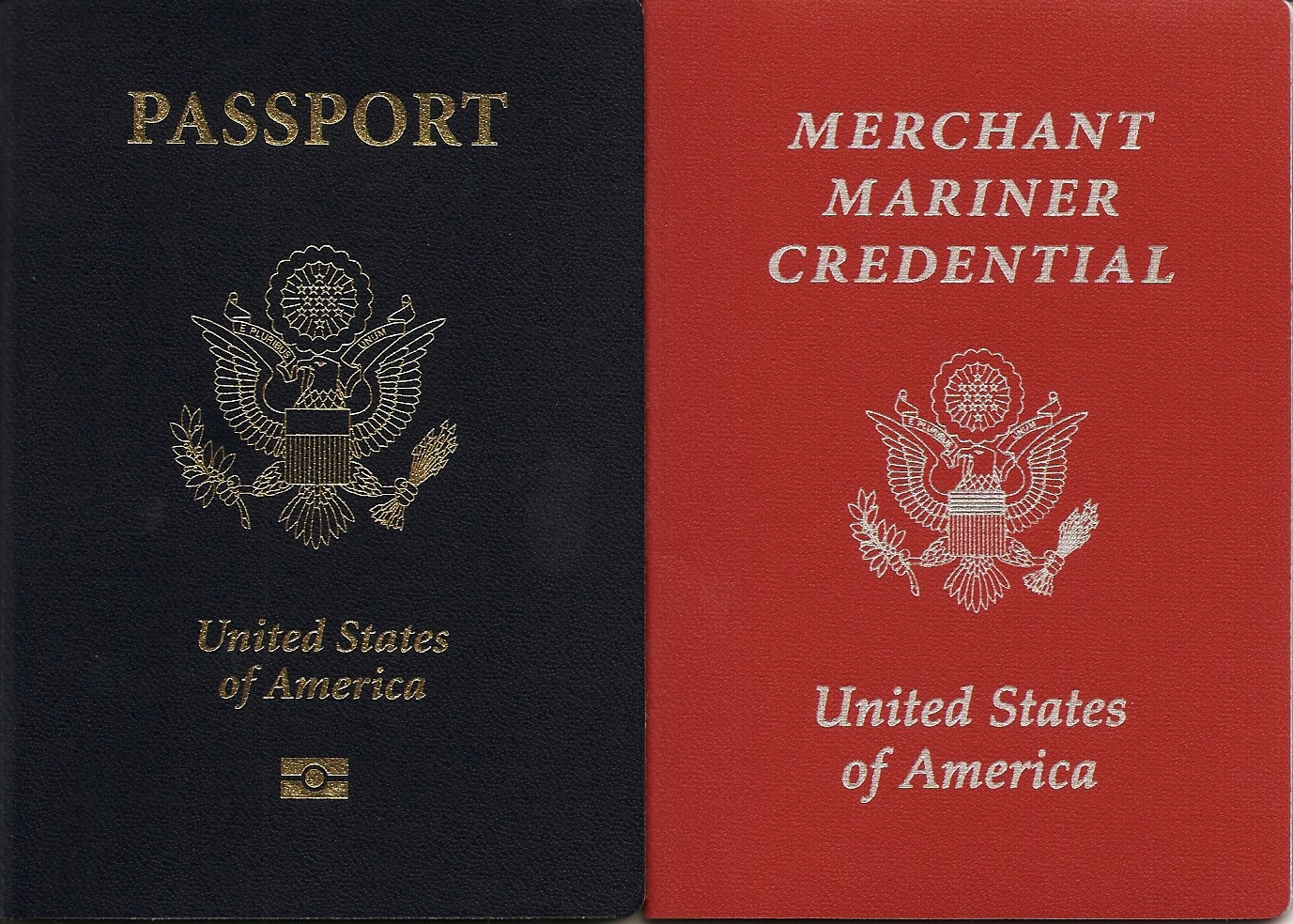
Side-by-side comparison between covers of US passport and an MMC (old style).

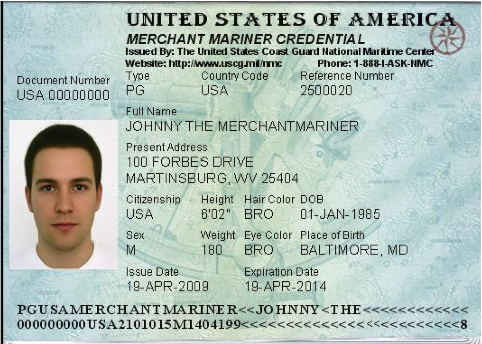
The data page of a sample MMC (old style). Note similarity to a passport.

Since March 1, 2024, the MMC is presented on one sheet of 8.5"x11" waterproof and tear-resistant synthetic paper, and contains several security measures including micro-printing, foiling, and intricate patterns. The credential may be folded to approximate the format of the old passport style MMC.

=== Old Passport Style MMC Format ===
The old format of the MMC is in the format of a traditional passport book. As MMCs have a validity period of five years, both the new and old formats are currently in use until April 30, 2029, when the last passport style MMC expires. Like a passport, the cover is imprinted with the Great Seal of the United States and the text United States of America. Unlike a passport, the cover is red-maroon in color (rather than the four colors used for US passports or travel documents: dark blue, black, maroon, and gray) and the text Merchant Mariner Credential appears in place of Passport. Also, the cover does not hold a contactless smart card chip as newer biometric passports (ePassports) do.

The old passport style MMC has twenty pages, exclusive of the front and back covers, sequentially numbered like the visa pages of a passport. Basic identity document data is page 3. The MMC is not a passport, but it is a Seafarer's Identity Document and the format of the data page complies with the ICAO Machine Readable Travel Documents specifications for machine-readable passports. Rather than the document type of P used with US government issued passports, a document type of PG is used for MMCs.

License information in the form of domestic and international endorsements begin on page 4 of the MMC and continue as many pages required to list competencies held by the mariner. Domestic (46 CFR 10) and International (STCW Convention) license information are printed on separate pages. When the mariner gains a new competency while holding an already valid MMC, the new competency is printed on a sticker which is placed on the next available blank page in the MMC, much like a visa in a passport. Thus new MMCs are only produced for original and renewals; raises in grade, removal or limitations, or addition of endorsements do not require a new credential.

The mariner's reference number and the MMC's serial number are printed on the bottom of every page containing endorsement information and on all stickers issued to be added. The endorsement pages are overprinted with a transparent plastic 'watermark' with the words 'Merchant Mariner Credential' and the seal of the United States.

MMC serial numbers are nine digits long, as required for a passport book, and padded with leading zeros.

The MMC has a clear plastic holder for the mariner's Medical Certificate on the inside of the back cover.

The MMC is considered a form of REAL ID and is therefore accepted as proof of identity by the TSA.

== See also ==
- Merchant Mariner's Document
- Seaman Service Book
- Continuous Discharge Certificate
- STCW
- Transportation Worker Identification Credential
- United States Merchant Marine
- United States Coast Guard
