= D-1 visa =

Non-immigrant visa for travel to the USA

The D-1 visa is a non-immigrant visa which allows travel to the United States for those serving as a crewman on marine vessel or aircraft, who will depart the US on the same vessel on which they arrived. Those who will depart on a different vessel would normally instead qualify for a D-2 visa.

Individuals are not eligible for a D-1 visa if their vessel is in dry dock, is a fishing vessel, they are a coasting officer, they are serving on a private yacht, or if they are destined for the outer continental shelf. The maximum duration of stay is 29 days.

D-1 visas may not be issue when a strike or lockout is present unless the individual has been employed at least one year, been employed in the last three months, and will continue to be employed.
