= B visa in lieu of other visas =

In the United States, the most common visa used for short-term trips is the B visa. This is a combination of the B-1 visa (for short-term business trips) and the B-2 visa (for short-term tourism/pleasure trips). People on B visas are generally not allowed to engage in productive work or study activities. However, in some cases, B visas can be issued that allow people to engage in some types of productive work and learning activity, in lieu of another visa. The three visa categories, for which a B visa could be issued instead, are the H-1B visa (the primary use case: a temporary visa for skilled workers), H-3 visa (a trainee and special education exchange visitor visa), and J-1 visa (a visa for exchange visitor students and scholars). The U.S. Department of State recommends that consular officers clearly annotate such B visas to make the scope of the visa clear to the applicant and the U.S. Customs and Border Protection officer at the port of entry.

Prior to the September 2001 attacks, the B visa could also be used by people on short courses of study, but now such people need to get a M-1 visa or F-1 visa. However, B visas may still have annotations that allow for transition to student visas through Form I-539.

Not all United States consulates offer B visas in lieu of other visas. The total number of such visas issued is also small: for instance, in 2011, the U.S. Department of State reported that fewer than 1000 B-1 in lieu of H-1B visas were issued annually. Some consulates, such as the Chennai consulate, explicitly listed the B-1 in lieu of H-1B as part of the Business Executive Program until that program was discontinued on April 1, 2015. Some consulates, such as the Mumbai consulate, list the B-1 in lieu of H-1B but not as part of any specific program.

This article discusses these rare uses of the B visa and the rules governing these uses.

== Rules and modifications ==
=== Inflexible rules ===
The following rules governing the B visa need to be honored even for B visas issued in lieu of other visas:

- The person must not receive compensation from a United States source; however, provision of accommodation or reimbursement of expenses incidental to a temporary stay are allowed.
- The person's stay must be temporary, both per visit and in terms of the total duration of stay (in case of a multi-entry visa).
- The person should still enter without immigrant intent or the intent to convert the stay to a long-term stay; for instance, the person should not look for employment in the U.S. job market.

=== Restrictions on usual B visas that get relaxed ===
People on usual B visas are allowed to engage in the following activities:

1. Engaging in commercial transactions, which do not involve gainful employment in the United States (such as a merchant taking orders for goods manufactured abroad)
2. Negotiating contracts
3. Consulting with business associates
4. Litigating a court case
5. Participating in scientific educational, professional, or business conventions, conferences, or seminars
6. Undertaking independent research

B visas issued in lieu of work or trainee visas add to this list of permissible activities the activity of productive work or learning activity in the specific context permitted by the visa. For instance, a B visa issued in lieu of a H-1B for a worker for a non-U.S. company working on a project for a U.S. client allows the worker to engage in productive work activity as part of completion of the project.

Generally, a B visa issued in lieu of any other visa category is strictly more powerful than an ordinary B visa. In particular, all activities permitted under an ordinary B visa are permitted for a B visa in lieu of another visa. In particular, a B visa in lieu of another visa can be used for ordinary business or travel purposes as long as the visa is valid.

=== Differences in the application criteria and process ===
For a typical work or exchange visitor visa, there are additional prior steps that need to be taken before the visa application:

- For all employer-sponsored nonimmigrant work or trainee visas (in particular, the H-1B visa and H-3 visa), Form I-129 (Petition for a Nonimmigrant Worker) needs to be filed with the United States Citizenship and Immigration Services.
- For the H-1B visa, a Labor Condition Application needs to be filed with and approved by the U.S. Department of Labor prior to filing Form I-129.
- The J-1 visa requires a Form DS-2019 to be issued by an appropriate Student and Exchange Visitor Program-certified institution.

Neither of these steps is part of the application process for a B visa in lieu of a work visa. Rather, the application is made directly to the consulate with all the relevant evidence submitted to the consulate.

The following are five criteria that need to be satisfied by work visa applicants and their petitioning employers:

1. The sponsoring entity (which is the employer in the case of work visas) is a United States entity.
2. (In the case of the H-1B) the employee's wages and working conditions are at or above that of other employees in the company, and hiring the employee will not adversely affect other employees (the precise nature of attestations that need to be made varies based on the visa category and the type of employer).
3. (In the case of the H-1B) the employee will be paid at or above the prevailing wage for that job and intended employment area (this is part of the Labor Condition Application for the H-1B status).
4. The employee is adequately qualified for skilled work. The standard of qualification and the nature of evidence needed varies based on the type of work visa.
5. There is a clear employer-employee relationship. In particular, self-petitions are (generally) not accepted.

The in lieu of visas differ in the following respects:

- Criterion (1) gets flipped around: the applicant now needs to demonstrate that the employer is a non-U.S. employer (note that B-1 in lieu of J-1 is a little different; see the section for more). In the case of an employer with no United States presence, this is easy. For multinationals, it is important to show that the applicant is employed and paid by the non-U.S. part of the company.
- Criterion (2) is no longer applicable, because the employer, being a non-U.S. employer, has no U.S. workforce.
- Criteria (3), (4), and (5) continue to be required. In particular, criterion (5) means that self-employed people cannot generally use this category.

=== Importance of having the "in lieu of" annotation at the time of visa issuance ===
An ordinary B visa cannot be retroactively changed by an applicant or his or her sponsoring company or institution to a B visa in lieu of another visa. Even if a person has an already valid B visa, the person must get a new B visa in lieu of the appropriate visa in order to visit the United States for productive work or study activities. When the person gets this visa, the earlier B visa is cancelled (without prejudice, i.e., in a way that indicates that this was not due to any fault or violation on the part of the applicant) and replaced by the new B visa.

=== Inapplicability to VWP travel ===
Most citizens of Visa Waiver Program (VWP) countries are eligible for visa-free travel to the United States for short-term business and tourist trips of the sort that would usually require B visas. However, people entering via the VWP, without a visa, cannot engage in the additional activities permitted for the in lieu of visas. In other words, the VWP mostly substitutes for ordinary B visas, but cannot substitute for B visas in lieu of other visas.

=== No change of status possible within the United States ===
Stay on the usual B visa can be extended while in the United States by filing Form I-539 with the United States Citizenship and Immigration Services. Form I-539 cannot be used to change the nature of the B visa to include the "in lieu of" annotation; such changes can only be made at a consulate.

=== No dependent visa ===
As with ordinary B visas, there is no visa for dependents of the in lieu of visas. However, the family members of B visa holders can still apply for ordinary B visas and use those to accompany or visit the holder of the in lieu of visa.

== History ==
=== Original use of B-1 in lieu of H-1 ===
The use of the B visa in lieu of other visas is not mentioned in any legislative statutes. The concept appears to have been first created in the 1960s in a joint effort of the Immigration and Naturalization Services (the predecessor to the U.S. Department of Homeland Security, that carried out all the immigration processing and enforcement functions currently carried out by the branches of the DHS) and the U.S. Department of State.

The first explicit articulation of the "B-1 In Lieu of H-1" category was in a 1982 cable. As of 1982, there was no separate H-1B visa; rather there was a single H-1 category for high-skilled workers (the H-1B in its present form would be created as a result of the Immigration Act of 1990). The cable was in response to Matter of Srinivasan, a case involving the denial of B-1 status to employees of an India-based computer company. The INS determined that the B-1 classification (in lieu of H-1) is appropriate under the following circumstances:

1. The alien receives no remuneration from a U.S. source
2. The alien is a bona fide nonimmigrant
3. The alien qualifies for H-1 status and will perform duties that "require distinguished merit and ability"
4. The services to be provided are necessary to the integrated international production, marketing, and service system of the corporation, its subsidiaries, and affiliates, and so [does] not involve the reassignment of an alien to an employer in the United States.

=== Changes in the 1990s ===
The Immigration Act of 1990 officially split the original H-1 visa into a H-1A visa (for nurses) and H-1B visa (for other categories of skilled workers) and imposed an annual numerical cap on H-1Bs. In 1993, the INS and the U.S. Department of State proposed regulations that, by explicitly listing all permissible uses of B-1 visas, would have eliminated the B-1 in lieu of H-1 category. However, these regulations were never implemented.

=== Tightening of restrictions on B visa use for study ===
After the September 11, 2001 attacks, people were no longer permitted to engage in even short courses of study on the B visa. Instead, such people needed to get a M-1 visa or F-1 visa. However, B visas may still have annotations that allow for transition to student status through Form I-539.

However, there is also a H-3 visa, which can be used by trainees (people who have been invited to participate in a training program) and special education exchange visitors. It is possible to receive a B-1 in lieu of H-3. It is also possible to receive a B-1 in lieu of a J-1 visa, but this applies only when the sponsoring entity is the United States government.

=== Renewed scrutiny in the 2010s ===
In the aftermath of revelations by whistleblower Palmer about apparently fraudulent immigration practices by multinational company Infosys, there was renewed scrutiny of the B-1 visa. Infosys paid a $34 million settlement to the United States government. Senator Chuck Grassley raised concerns about the use of B-1 in lieu of H-1B, in particular highlighting the lack of protections for United States labor because, unlike H-1B visas, no Labor Condition Application was needed. In response, Cyrus Mehta and Myriam Jaidi, writing for Immigration Daily, noted that there were many work visa categories, such as the L-1 visa and O-1 visa, that did not require a LCA, and the B-1 in lieu of H-1B was not unique in this regard. Immigration lawyer Angelo Paparelli stressed the importance of not jeopardizing the B visa.

The U.S. Department of State's response to Grassley's questions led some commentators to believe that the B-1 in lieu of visas were in imminent danger. However, a cable issued by the Department of State in June 2012, with updated guidelines on the use of B-1 in lieu of H-1B and H-3, suggested that the category would still continue to be used.

== B-1 in lieu of H-1B ==
The most common B in lieu of visa is the B-1 issued in lieu of the H-1B visa. To better understand the role of this visa, we review the main use case of the H-1B visa.

=== H-1B visa ===
The H-1B status is a temporary nonimmigrant worker status working for a United States employer granted for up to three years (extendable by another three years, after which it can be extended only in case of pending Form I-140 or Adjustment of Status applications). The procedure for obtaining the status is as follows:

- The United States employer files a Labor Condition Application for the worker with the United States Department of Labor, making various attestations related to wages, working conditions, effect on currently employed workers, strikes and lockouts, and notice. If the employer is a H-1B-dependent employer or a willful violator and the worker is not exempt based on compensation or educational qualifications, additional attestations related to displacement of United States workers are needed.
- The United States employer files a Form I-129 H-1B petition for the nonimmigrant worker with the United States Citizenship and Immigration Services. The petition includes the LCA as well as proof that the worker is skilled in ways that are needed on the job. The first H-1B petition for a worker not made by a nonprofit research institution is subject to the annual H-1B cap (65,000 general + 20,000 for master's degree holders) that is applied every fiscal year. Since Form I-129 can be submitted at most six months in advance, petitions with a start date of October 1 (the first date of the fiscal year) are generally submitted in the beginning of April, and the annual caps are usually met within the first week of April.
- Once the H-1B petition is approved, the worker may start working at the indicated start date of employment with the employer. If the worker is outside the United States prior the start date of employment, the worker needs to obtain a H-1B visa at a United States consulate. The consulate looks at the LCA, Form I-129, employment letter and other pieces of evidence and in addition vets the application based on the standard criteria for allocating a visa (strong home country ties, no grounds of inadmissibility). The worker can use the H-1B visa to enter the country at most ten days before the start date, and receives a Form I-94 from U.S. Customs and Border Protection's Office of Field Operations officer for the duration of the H-1B.

In particular, the following aspects of the H-1B make it unsuitable for various kinds of temporary work:

- For first-time cap-subject workers, petitions can de facto be submitted only in the first week of April and for jobs starting in October. This makes it difficult for short-term work that is needed suddenly.
- For first-time cap-subject workers, unless the worker has a master's degree, making it through the cap is a matter of luck.
- The process requires the filing of the LCA and Form I-129. Both of these have bureaucratic, legal, and administrative overhead. The latter in particular costs both time and money.
- The employer sponsoring the worker must be a United States entity. It therefore cannot be used by non-U.S. employers who seek to send workers to the United States to work with a client. Rather, the client would have to sponsor the worker as an employee.

=== What the B-1 in lieu of H-1B does ===
For multinational companies that have both United States and international offices, or for non-U.S. companies with U.S. clients, the B-1 in lieu of H-1B is a viable option. The B-1 in lieu of H-1B differs from the H-1B in the following respects:

- No Labor Condition Application needs to be filed. In particular, no attestations need to be made regarding wages and working conditions, or (in the case of H-1B-dependent employers) displacement of US workers.
- No Form I-129 needs to be filed. Thus, the cost, bureaucratic overhead, and time of the form are saved on.
- The duration and terms of the visa match those of a B visa rather than a H-1B visa.

However, the B-1 in lieu of H-1B does require the worker to demonstrate that he or she is skilled and that the skills are needed for the job being performed in the United States. The worker must also show that the wage being paid to the worker is at or above the prevailing wage for that occupation and intended employment area. A clear employer-employee relationship must be established, and in the case of multinationals, it must be clearly demonstrated that the worker is employed and paid by the non-U.S. part of the company. These demonstrations need to be made directly to the consulate rather than having to first go through USCIS.

All the other usual requirements needed to obtain a nonimmigrant visa continue to apply, namely strong home times (to overcome the Section 214(b) ground of denial) and not satisfying any of the grounds of inadmissibility.

=== Advantages ===
There are a few key reasons why employers might use the B-1 in lieu of H-1B:

- For non-U.S. companies with U.S. clients, this category may make more sense than the H-1B, since the worker will continue to be employed by the non-U.S. employer. In fact, using a regular H-1B may not even be feasible if the company has no U.S. presence.
- The total time taken, from the decision to apply to the time the worker can start work, is much shorter than the 6 months taken for a H-1B position. In particular, it may be more suitable for work that needs to be urgently done. Moreover, the B-1 is not subject to the annual H-1B cycle and the lottery.
- The total cost of application generally comes out to be lower.

=== Disadvantages ===
The following have been cited as disadvantages of the B-1 in lieu of H-1B:

- It is available only at some consulates.
- Purely U.S.-based companies cannot use this category, and multinationals with significant U.S. presence may have trouble obtaining it, since they need to show that the worker is employed by the non-U.S. part of the company.
- The maximum duration of stay matches that of a B visa, and in particular cannot be used for long-term employment.

== B-1 in lieu of H-3 ==
=== Summary ===
The H-3 visa is a temporary visa for trainees and special education exchange visitors. It has two subcategories:

- The H-3 trainee visa: This is for trainees being sponsored by a United States entity to receive training not available in the trainee's home country. No productive work activity is allowed on this visa.
- The H-3 special education exchange visitor visa: This is to participate in a special education exchange visitor training program for children with physical, mental, or emotional disabilities. There is a cap of 50 visas per year, and only one was approved in 2012.

A B-1 visa can be issued in lieu of the H-3 trainee visa. In both cases (the H-3 trainee visa and the B-1 in lieu of H-3), both these conditions must be satisfied:

- No productive work activity is allowed while on the visa except on-the-job training explicitly specified as part of the program.
- The training must not be available in the applicant's home country.

The key differences between the H-3 and the B-1 in lieu of H3 are:

- The H-3 can be issued only when the sponsoring entity is a United States entity. The B-1 in lieu of H-3 can be issued only when the sponsoring entity is a non-U.S. entity.
- The sponsoring entity must file Form I-129 with the United States Citizenship and Immigration Services and receive an approval notice prior to a H-3 visa application. However, for the B-1 in lieu of H-3, an application can be made directly to the United States consulate, and Form I-129 is not relevant.
- The B-1 in lieu of H-3 has the same time limits on stay as usual B-1 visas, which is a maximum of 6 months per year, and therefore a maximum of 6 contiguous months. It may therefore not be usable for people on training programs of a longer duration.

=== Advantages ===
- For non-U.S. companies, this category may make more sense and may in fact be the only feasible category to use.
- Since there is no intermediate step involving Form I-129, the total time taken to obtain the visa is shorter.

=== Disadvantages ===
- It is available only at some consulates.
- Purely U.S.-based companies cannot use this category, and multinationals with significant U.S. presence may have trouble obtaining it, since they need to demonstrate that the trainee is under the non-U.S. part of the company.
- The maximum duration of stay matches that of a B visa, and in particular cannot be used for training programs longer than six months.

== B-1 in lieu of J-1 ==
The J-1 visa is a special visa for exchange visitors (students or scholars) sponsored by a university, private sector, or government program. The B-1 in lieu of J-1 is used if all the conditions below are satisfied, as clarified in a 2004 memo issued by the U.S. Department of State:

- The sponsoring entity is part of the government of the United States (usually, a U.S mission abroad).
- The purpose of the visit does not fall under an already approved exchange visitor program. Generally, a letter stating this from the sponsoring entity within the United States government is required.
