= Merchant Mariner's Document =

Identifying credential

Under the Seafarers' Identity Documents Convention, 1958, countries with a merchant navy (also called a merchant marine) require identifying credentials for their mariners. The Merchant Mariner's Document (MMD) or Z-card in the United States, and the Ordinary Seaman's Certificate in the United Kingdom are examples of these credentials.

== United Kingdom ==
An Ordinary Seaman Certificate is a required certification to obtain a job as an Ordinary Seaman, a rating in a merchant ship's deck department. It consists mostly of proof of identity, proof of some minimal health (possibly including a drug test) and some minimal age, and the standards defined under Standards of Training, Certification and Watchkeeping for Seafarers (STCW).

== United States ==
The Merchant Mariner's Document (MMD), previously called a Z-Card, is a kind of Merchant Mariner Credential previously issued by the United States Coast Guard in accordance with the STCW guidelines, and, until completely phased out, remains one of the standard documents required for all crewmembers of U.S. ships with a gross tonnage of over 100. An entry-level MMD allows a mariner to work on the deck as an Ordinary Seaman (OS), in the engine department as a Wiper, or in the steward's department as a Food Handler (FH). With experience and testing, qualified ratings such as Able Seaman (AB) or Qualified Member of the Engine Department (QMED) can be obtained. The document is about the size of a passport, and contains the sailor's information regarding date of birth, the location of issue, nationality, and the shipboard duties he or she is qualified for.

The document was created shortly after World War II ended in 1945 in order to maintain security in ports around the world when sabotage was still a major concern. Today, the document still serves this purpose and is regarded as a proof of identity and a passport when a sailor is in a foreign country. The document has to be renewed every five years.

Prior to the early 1990s, Z-Cards were obtained free of charge and were good for life, but increased safety standards in the maritime industry sought to require all active mariners to renew these documents and constantly train to stay abreast of any advancements in their field. All applicants for a Z-Card are required to apply, take a drug test, and wait for a criminal background check to complete before receiving their documents, which can take from a few weeks to several years.

The name Z-Card comes from its early days, when a sailor's ID number always started with the letter 'Z'.

The Coast Guard has begun replacing the Merchant Mariner's Document, STCW Certificate, and Certificate of Registry with a new credential, a passport-style Merchant Mariner Credential. Mariners receive the new credential when they apply for a new document or renew their current one. Current MMDs remain valid until their expiration date.

== See also ==
- Seaman Service Book
- Continuous Discharge Certificate
- Merchant Mariner Credential
