= Safety and Health in Agriculture Convention, 2001 =

International Labour Organization Convention

C184
- ILO Convention
- Date of adoption: June 21, 2001
- Date in force: September 20, 2003
- Classification: Occupational Safety and Health
- Subject: Occupational Safety and Health
- Previous: Maternity Protection Convention, 2000
- Next: Seafarers' Identity Documents Convention (Revised), 2003

Safety and Health in Agriculture Convention, 2001 is an International Labour Organization Convention.

It was established in 2001, with the preamble stating:

Noting the Tripartite Declaration of Principles concerning Multinational Enterprises and Social Policy as well as the relevant codes of practice, in particular the code of practice on recording and notification of occupational accidents and diseases, 1996, and the code of practice on safety and health in forestry work, 1998, and

Having decided upon the adoption of certain proposals with regard to safety and health in agriculture,...

== Ratifications ==
As of 2023, the convention has been ratified by 21 states.

Country	Date	Status
Antigua and Barbuda	28 Jul 2021	In Force
Argentina	26 Jun 2006	In Force
Belgium	10 Nov 2015	In Force
Bosnia and Herzegovina	18 Jan 2010	In Force
Burkina Faso	28 Oct 2009	In Force
Fiji	28 May 2008	In Force
Finland	21 Feb 2003	In Force
France	26 Jan 2021	In Force
Ghana	06 Jun 2011	In Force
Iraq	21 May 2021	In Force
Kyrgyzstan	10 May 2004	In Force
Luxembourg	08 Apr 2008	In Force
Malawi	07 Nov 2019	In Force
Portugal	08 Nov 2012	In Force
Moldova	20 Sep 2002	In Force
Sao Tome and Principe	4 May 2005	In Force
Slovakia	14 Jun 2002	In Force
Sweden	09 Jun 2004	In Force
Uruguay	25 May 2005	In Force

== ILO's OSH Meeting (2009) ==
In accordance with the decisions taken by the governing body of the International Labor Organization, a meeting of experts in the field of occupational safety and health (OSH) at work in the agricultural sector was held in Geneva in 2009. The purpose of the meeting was to discuss a draft code of conduct for agricultural safety and health. Based on ILO's Safety and Health in Agriculture Convention (2001) codes of practice are technical standards that provide practical guidance for certain sectors or topics. Existing ILO standards, conventions and recommendations are often supplemented or expanded, but these additions and expansions are not binding, unlike conventions. Detailed technical advice on the sector or topic is essential when putting occupational safety and health (OSH) into practice. It is important that compliance with occupational safety and health (OSH) standards for female workers are differentiated. As the majority of agricultural workers are women, this code takes into account the gender-specific challenges of occupational safety and health (OSH) in agriculture.

== ILO's OSH Related Scientific Research (2018) ==
A scientific study by Occupational Safety and Health Research Institute (OSHRI) in 2018 used SWOT analysis to analyze legislation on occupational safety and health in low- and middle-income countries. Under the ILO’s Safety and Health in Agriculture Convention (2001), the necessary changes have been identified in order to develop international best practice. Additional laws and interventions were envisaged in the summary of the analysis. Although the agricultural sector employed more than 70% of the population in the countries surveyed, most of them did not yet have legislation on health and safety at work in the sector. Laws do not place enough emphasis on creating a fair position for women, are fragmented among different government agencies and are incomplete, outdated, and not sufficiently deterrent to potential violators. The authors of the scientific study had concluded that the legal framework needs to be renewed and that legal harmonization is needed.
