= Seafarers' Identity Documents Convention (Revised), 2003 =

International Labour Organization Convention

C185
- ILO Convention
- Date of adoption: June 19, 2003
- Date in force: February 9, 2005
- Classification: Seafarers
- Subject: Seafarers
- Previous: Safety and Health in Agriculture Convention, 2001
- Next: Maritime Labour Convention, 2006

Seafarers' Identity Documents Convention (Revised), 2003 (C185) is an International Labour Organization Convention.

It was established in 1958, with the preamble stating:

Having been convened at Geneva by the Governing Body of the International Labour Office, and having met in its Ninety-first Session on 3 June 2003, and Mindful of the continuing threat to the security of passengers and crews and the safety of ships, to the national interest of States and to individuals, and

Mindful also of the core mandate of the Organization, which is to promote decent conditions of work, and

Considering that, given the global nature of the shipping industry, seafarers need special protection, and

Recognizing the principles embodied in the Seafarers' Identity Documents Convention, 1958, concerning the facilitation of entry by seafarers into the territory of Members, for the purposes of shore leave, transit, transfer or repatriation, and..

== Modifications ==
This Convention revised Convention C108 Seafarers' Identity Documents Convention, 1958.

== Ratifications ==
As of February 2023, the convention has been ratified by 38 states.

Country	Date	Status
Albania	11 Oct 2007	In Force
Antigua and Barbuda	28 Jul 2021	In Force
Azerbaijan	17 Jul 2006	In Force
Bahamas	14 Dec 2006	In Force
Bangladesh	28 Apr 2014	In Force
Bosnia and Herzegovina	18 Jan 2010	In Force
Brazil	21 Jan 2010	In Force
Congo	14 May 2014	In Force
Croatia	06 Sep 2011	In Force
France	27 Apr 2004	In Force
Georgia	03 Feb 2015	In Force
Hungary	30 Mar 2005	In Force
India	09 Oct 2015	In Force
Indonesia	16 Jul 2008	In Force
Iraq	21 May 2021	In Force
Jordan	09 Aug 2004	In Force
Kazakhstan	17 May 2010	In Force
Kenya	04 Feb 2022	In Force
Kiribati	06 Jun 2014	In Force
Lithuania	14 Aug 2006	Not in force
Luxembourg	20 Sep 2011	In Force
Madagascar	06 Jun 2007	In Force
Maldives	05 Jan 2015	In Force
Marshall Islands	24 Aug 2011	In Force
Montenegro	27 Apr 2017	In Force
Myanmar	16 Jan 2018	In Force
Nigeria	19 Aug 2004	In Force
Pakistan	21 Dec 2006	In Force
Philippines	19 Jan 2012	In Force
Republic of Korea	04 Apr 2007	In Force
Republic of Moldova	28 Aug 2006	In Force
Russian Federation	26 Feb 2010	In Force
Spain	26 May 2011	In Force
Sri Lanka	02 Dec 2016	In Force
Tanzania	11 Oct 2017	In Force
Tunisia	19 May 2016	In Force
Turkmenistan	12 Feb 2014	In Force
Vanuatu	28 Jul 2006	In Force
Yemen	06 Oct 2008	In Force

== Differences between the C185 and C108 Seafarers' Identity Document Conventions ==
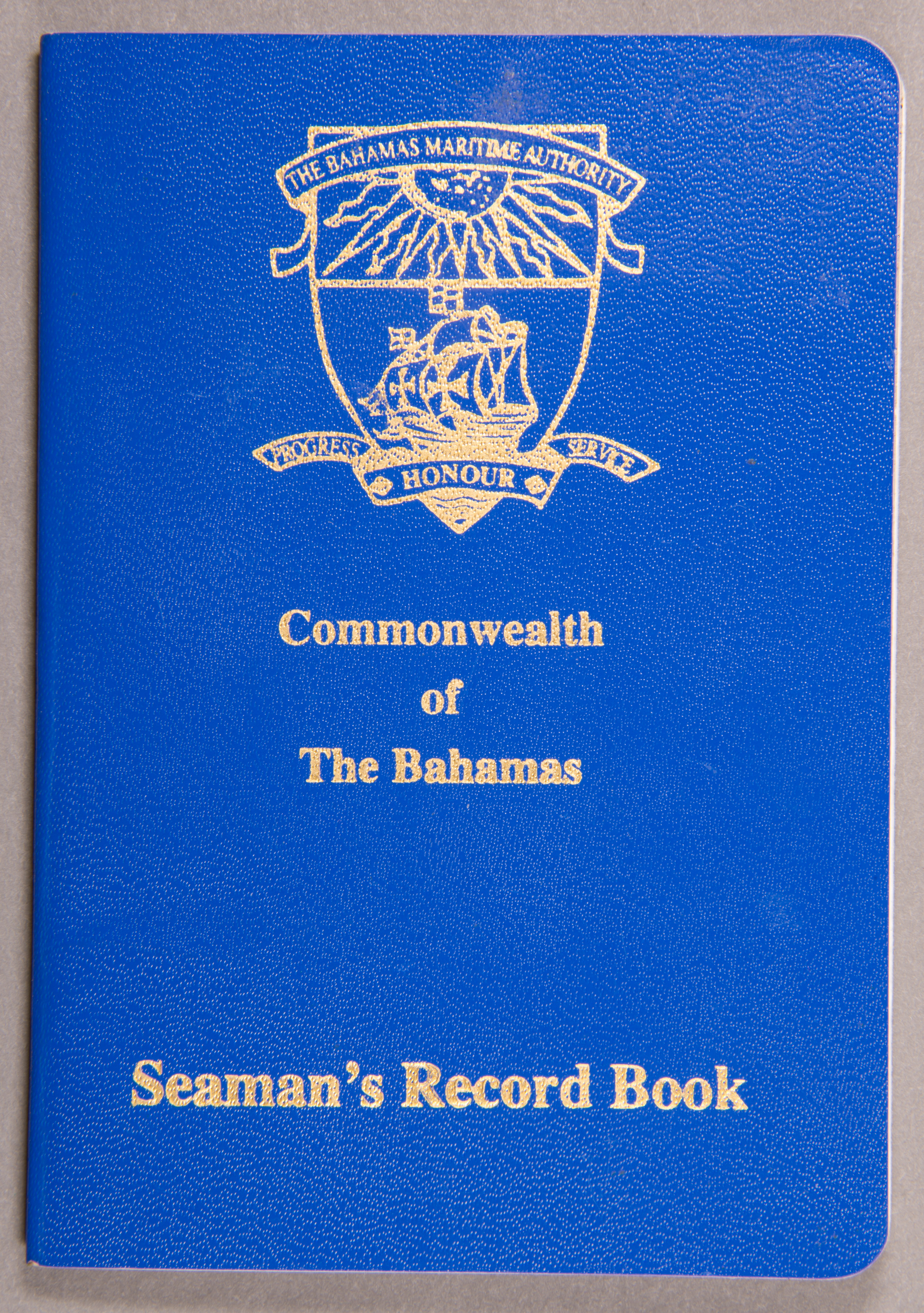
The Bahamas Seaman's Book

The main difference between C185 and C108 is the use of biometric data as a reliable means of identification. The successful application of the C185 required two main requirements:

1. the application of the necessary biometric technology;
2. the establishment of an appropriate infrastructure to control, manufacture and secure the production process of identifiers.

The requirements set out in the Convention have proved to be feasible.

E-passports and e-official travel documents have been used internationally since their introduction in 2006. By 2018, more than 100 countries have already issued e-documents, which predicts the likelihood that these countries will ratify C185.

== See also ==
- STCW Convention
