= I-1 visa =

An I-1 visa is a non-immigrant visa issued by the United States for foreign media representatives and journalists who travel to the United States for the purpose of working exclusively in their profession. All applicants must meet eligibility criteria, which requires them to be residents of foreign countries, working for foreign information outlets headquartered in their respective countries.

The I-1 visa does not grant anyone guaranteed entry to the United States. It initially gives the holder permission to travel to the United States port-of-entry for an interview with a representative of the United States Citizenship and Immigration Services, who decides whether or not the holder should be given the right to cross the border and work in the United States.

Applicants for the I-1 visa must be able to prove that their activities in the United States are of great value to the employing organization. These activities must not have any commercial motive, such as entertainment or advertising, while the organization itself must represent press, radio, film, print or other types of information media. Any activity that does not rely on the process of gathering information and reporting on actual events that take place within the territory of the United States cannot be considered grounds for obtaining the I-1 visa.

Every foreign media representative who is willing to visit the United States to engage in the media profession must apply for the I-1 visa. American immigration law does not allow holders of other visa types or those visiting the United States under any other status or programs, such as the Visa Waiver Program, to work for foreign media outlets without the I-1 visa. The only exception is representatives working for the United Nations Organization.

Spouses and children of the I-1 visa holder can legally travel to the United States with them after obtaining the same type of visa (derivative visa). Immediate family members are allowed to study, but they are not allowed to take any job while staying in the United States.

== Application process ==
- An applicant must complete application Form DS-160 online, submit a photo meeting the requirements, and print the confirmation page to bring it to the interview at the American Embassy or Consulate
- An applicant must schedule an appointment at the Embassy or Consulate in the country of their permanent residence
- An applicant must submit a visa application fee before the interview, if required (depending on the country)
- An applicant must prepare the following documentation before an interview:
  - Valid passport
  - Visa application, confirmation page
  - Application fee payment receipt
  - Photo (for those who fail to upload it)
  - Proof of employment (depending on the country and occupation)
- An applicant must undergo an interview with the consular officer
- An applicant is required to pick up their passport after all administrative processing is completed and pay a fee for visa issuance

== Duration of status ==
The I visa is usually issued for one year. Upon arrival to the US port-of-entry, every I visa holder is provided with Form I-94 and a stamp that determines a time frame of their authorized stay in the country. I visa holders are not required to leave or re-enter the country during their stay, but must leave the United States on or before the date their permission document expires.

== Visa extension ==
The I visa holder has a right to extend their stay in the United States for an unlimited amount of time by filing an Application to Extend/Change Nonimmigrant Status (Form I-539) and providing the necessary documentation and fees. The procedure of extension does not require the holder of a media visa to leave the country, whereas a visa revalidation can only be processed outside the United States.

== Change of status or employer ==
Change of the I visa holder's status from one nonimmigrant category to another is conducted through filing an Application to Extend/Change Nonimmigrant Status (Form I-539). An applicant must gather necessary documentation, undergo the prescribed procedure and pay necessary fees, as well as to provide evidence of their status and employment.

== Statistics ==
The number of I visas issued varies from year to year: 13,674 were granted in FY 2014; 14,447 in FY 2015; 14,536 in FY 2016; 14,126 in FY 2017; and 11,874 in FY 2018. In 2018, the nations with the largest number of I visa recipients were the United Kingdom (1,768 visas granted); Japan (1,205); Germany (888); Mexico (702); and France (641).
