= STCW Convention =

Convention to set standards for seafarers

STCW
International Convention on Standards of Training, Certification and Watchkeeping for Seafarers
- Signed: 7 July 1978
- Location: London, UK
- Effective: 28 April 1984
- Condition: 25 ratifications, the combined merchant fleets of which constitute not less than 50% of the gross tonnage of the world's merchant shipping of ships of 100 gross tonnage or more
- Parties: 164
- Depositary: Secretary-General of the International Maritime Organization
- Languages: English, French, Russian and Spanish

International Convention on Standards of Training, Certification and Watchkeeping for Seafarers (STCW) sets minimum qualification standards for masters, officers and watch personnel on seagoing merchant ships and large yachts. STCW was adopted in 1978 by the International Maritime Organization (IMO) conference in London, and entered into force in 1984. The convention was significantly amended in 1995 and 2010, and entered into force on 1 January 2012.

The 1978 STCW Convention Caruso was the first to establish minimum basic requirements on training, certification and watchkeeping for seafarers on an international level. Previously the minimum standards of training, certification and watchkeeping of officers and ratings were established by individual governments, usually without reference to practices in other countries. As a result, minimum standards and procedures varied widely, even though shipping is extremely international by nature.

The convention prescribes minimum standards relating to training, certification and watchkeeping for seafarers which countries are obliged to meet or exceed.

The convention did not deal with manning levels: IMO provisions in this area are covered by regulation 14 of Chapter V of the International Convention for the Safety of Life at Sea (SOLAS), 1974, whose requirements are backed up by resolution A.890(21) Principles of safe manning, adopted by the IMO Assembly in 1999, which replaced an earlier resolution A.481(XII) adopted in 1981 and has since been itself replaced by resolution A.1047(27) Principles of Minimum Safe Manning, adopted by the IMO Assembly in 2011.

One especially important feature of the convention is that it applies to ships of non-party states when visiting ports of states which are parties to the convention. Article X requires parties to apply the control measures to ships of all flags to the extent necessary to ensure that no more favourable treatment is given to ships entitled to fly the flag of a state which is not a party than is given to ships entitled to fly the flag of a state that is a party.

The difficulties which could arise for ships of states which are not parties to the convention is one reason why the convention has received such wide acceptance. By 2018, the STCW Convention had 164 parties, representing 99.2 per cent of world shipping tonnage.

== 1995 revision ==
On 7 July 1995, the IMO adopted a comprehensive revision of STCW. It also included a proposal to develop a new STCW Code, which would contain the technical details associated with provisions of the convention. The amendments entered force on 1 February 1997. Full implementation was required by 1 February 2002. Mariners already holding certification had the option to renew the certificates in accordance with the old rules of the 1978 Convention during the period ending on 1 February 2002. Mariners entering training programs after 1 August 1998 are required to meet the competency standards of the new 1995 Amendments.

The most significant amendments concerned:

- a) enhancement of port state control;
- b) communication of information to IMO to allow for mutual oversight and consistency in application of standards,
- c) quality standards systems (QSS), oversight of training, assessment, and certification procedures,
  - The Amendments require that seafarers be provided

== Manila Amendments ==
The IMO Convention on Standards of Training Certification and Watchkeeping of Seafarers adopted a new set of amendments in Manila in 2010 called "The Manila Amendments". These amendments were necessary to keep training standards in line with new technological and operational requirements that require new shipboard competencies. The Manila Amendments were effective as of 1 January 2012. There was a transition period until 2017 when all seafarers had to be certified and trained according to the new standards. Implementation was progressive, every year a modified set of requirements came into force. The most significant amendments are:

- New rest hours for seafarers
- New grades of certificates of competency for able seafarers in both deck and engine
- New and updated training, refreshing requirements
- Mandatory security training
- Additional medical standards
- Specific alcohol limits in blood or breath.

== STCW-F Convention ==
On 7 July 1995, the International Convention on Standards of Training, Certification and Watchkeeping for Fishing Vessel Personnel was adopted as a separate treaty as part of the comprehensive revisions to STCW. It applies the principles of STCW to fishing vessels from ratifying states that are 24 metres in length and above. STCW-F came into force on 29 September 2012.

== See also ==
- Seafarers' Identity Documents Convention, 1958; Seafarers' Identity Documents Convention (Revised), 2003
- Merchant Mariner Credential, a US credential
- Seaman Service Book, credential in Pakistan
- Continuous Discharge Certificate, in India
- Merchant Mariner's Document, UK and formerly US
