= D-2 visa =

The D-2 visa is a non-immigrant visa which allows travel to the United States for those serving as a crewman on marine vessel or aircraft, who will depart on a different vessel than that on which they arrived. Those who will depart on the same vessel would normally instead qualify for a D-1 visa. Individuals are not eligible for a D-1 visa if their vessel is in dry dock, is a fishing vessel, they are a coasting officer, or if they are destined for the outer continental shelf. The maximum duration of stay is 29 days. Travelers may present a seaman's book rather than a passport as identification. Those serving on a private yacht normally would not be eligible unless they are sailing out of a foreign home port, and will be in US waters for more than 29 days.

The normal maximum duration of stay for a D-1 visa is 29 days; however this can be extended for up to 120 days.
