= Seafarers' Identity Documents Convention, 1958 =

International Labour Organization Convention

C108
- ILO Convention
- Date of adoption: May 13, 1958
- Date in force: February 19, 1961
- Classification: Seafarers
- Subject: Seafarers
- Previous: Indigenous and Tribal Populations Convention, 1957
- Next: Wages, Hours of Work and Manning (Sea) Convention (Revised), 1958

Seafarers' Identity Documents Convention, 1958 is an International Labour Organization convention concerning Merchant Mariner's Document.

It was established in 1958, with the preamble stating:

Having decided upon the adoption of certain proposals with regard to the reciprocal or international recognition of seafarers' national identity cards,...

An identity document issued under the convention or its successor is colloquially called a Seaman's Book or a Seaman's Card.

== Modifications ==
The convention was subsequently revised in 2003 by Convention C185 Seafarers' Identity Documents Convention (Revised), 2003. In ILO documents phrases like "denounced by C185" sound like the removal of Seaman's Rights, but it's really the adoption of a revised version.

== Ratifications ==
As of January 2023, the convention had been ratified by 64 states. Eleven of the ratifying states have automatically denounced the convention by their subsequent acceptance of conventions that trigger denunciation.

== See also ==
- STCW Convention
