= American Families United Act =

Proposed amendment to US nationality law

- Long title: To amend the Immigration and Nationality Act to promote family unity, and for other purposes.
- Acronyms (colloquial): AFU Act, AFUA
- Announced in: the 119th United States Congress

Codification
- Acts amended: Immigration and Nationality Act of 1952
- Titles amended: 8 U.S.C.: Aliens and Nationality
- U.S.C. sections amended: 8 U.S.C. ch. 12, subch. II § 1229a(c)(4); 8 U.S.C. ch. 12, subch. II § 1182

Legislative history
- Introduced in the United States House of Representatives as H.R. 2366 by Veronica Escobar D‑TX 16th on March 26th, 2025; Committee consideration by United States House Committee on the Judiciary

The American Families United Act (often abbreviated as the AFU Act) is a proposed United States law that would amend the Immigration and Nationality Act of 1952 to give immigration judges and officials the authority to make case-by-case decisions in cases involving the spouses and children of U.S. citizens. This authority would allow the government to decide whether to terminate removal proceedings, waive inadmissibility grounds, and provide similar relief when family separation causes hardship to U.S. citizens. The Act defines family separation as a hardship. The Act also includes special provisions for widows, widowers, and surviving children of deceased U.S. citizens, while excluding individuals with certain criminal, terrorism, or national security-related violations or inadmissibility grounds.

Bipartisan proposals of the AFU Act have been introduced in every session of Congress since its initial introduction in the 113th Congress in 2014.

The entire text of the AFU Act is included in the Dignity Act, a comprehensive immigration reform bill sponsored by María Elvira Salazar (R‑FL 27th).

== Background ==
=== Current legal framework ===
==== IIRAIRA, admissibility bars, and need for waiver reform ====
The Illegal Immigration Reform and Immigrant Responsibility Act of 1996 (IIRAIRA), signed into law by President Bill Clinton on September 30, 1996, made major changes to the Immigration and Nationality Act, shaping the current framework of U.S. immigration policy.

One significant byproduct of IIRIRA was the establishment of admissibility bars, which prevent certain immigrants from legally reentering the U.S. for extended periods—sometimes even permanently.

Immigrants who enter the U.S. without authorization (as opposed to overstaying a visa) and later marry a U.S. citizen are unable to adjust their status while in the country. Instead, they must leave and undergo consular processing at a U.S. embassy or consulate in their home country. However, departing the U.S. triggers admissibility bars, preventing reentry for a specified period, often three or ten years. In some cases, a permanent bar may be imposed, making it impossible for the immigrant to return legally.

Waivers for inadmissibility are available in limited scenarios but are subject to strictly narrow eligibility criteria. Some waivers may be granted if the inadmissibility results in "extreme hardship" to a U.S. citizen (or sometimes a lawful permanent resident). However, the burden of proof lies on the applicant and their family to demonstrate that extreme hardship will occur. Notably, family separation alone is not considered a sufficient reason to meet the high standard for these waivers, even when involving a U.S. citizen.

Additionally, waiver applications can be significantly delayed due to bureaucratic backlogs. For example, as of April 4th, 2025, USCIS reports the processing time for a Provisional Unlawful Presence Waiver (Form I-601A) at 37 months. Backlogs have become so extreme that an increasing number of families have turned to suing USICS in federal court to force the agency to adjudicate their waiver applications. The number of such suits, as tracked by the Syracuse University research group Transactional Records Access Clearinghouse, suggests strain on the federal judiciary.

==== Lack of discretion under IRAIRA ====
In a 1998 press release, The American Immigration Lawyers Association (AILA) wrote:

IIRAIRA contains many provisions that strip the courts of any authority to review the decision of the INS. Under IIRAIRA, virtually all discretionary decisions affording relief to eligible individuals are no longer reviewable by a court. This 'court-stripping' is unprecedented and unconstitutional. Judicial review of individual decisions by INS officers and of INS procedures and applications should be restored in order to protect against mistake and abuse.

==== Consular processing ====
Consular processing—the process by which a foreign national applies for a U.S. immigrant visa at a U.S. embassy or consulate in their home country to become a permanent resident—is often the cause of family separation for U.S. citizens. When a non-citizen spouse goes through consular processing and reaches their interview by a U.S. State Department official, they may face new, or even incorrect, charges of inadmissibility and wrongful visa denials.

The Consular Accountability Project, which describes itself as “a legal defense organization fighting for accountability and oversight of the consular process," states:

Each year, consular officers with highly variable degrees of experience make decisions that forever alter the course of millions of lives. Though decisions are commonly erroneous and arbitrary, the executive branch asserts that the consular process is exempt from the basic constitutional protections that apply in all other areas of law. Too often, interviews at consulates are treated as interrogations where the suspect has no Miranda rights. Accountability in the consular process is critical to protect the rights of mixed-status families and prevent executive branch abuse.

Current legal doctrine, though widely disputed, holds that consular decisions are not subject to review by the U.S. judicial system. This means that U.S. citizens who seek to normalize the status of their undocumented spouse may begin that legal process in good faith within the United States while physically together with their spouse, only to later be forced to leave the country and complete the process outside the jurisdiction of the courts established under Article III of the U.S. Constitution. AILA writes:

To understand how dangerous this doctrine is, imagine yourself in the following situation: You’re a US citizen with an undocumented spouse who has applied for a green card. Everything is going smoothly, your spouse appears eligible, and as the last step in the process, they fly to their home country for an interview at the US consulate. Instead of coming home with a green card as expected, the State Department tells your spouse they cannot return to the US at all. The State Department doesn’t give a reason, they simply say your spouse might engage in unlawful activity if allowed back into the US. You ask for clarification and receive none, and because you do not know the reason for the denial, you have no way to disprove it. What can you do to unite your family and bring your spouse back home? Most Americans will respond instinctively: 'I have the right to my day in court.' But according to the doctrine of consular non-reviewability, you don’t.

Supreme Court Justice Sonia Sotomayor describes consular processing as an "enormous risk" of "unexpected exile" adding that "Former consular officers tell [us] that this lack of accountability, coupled with deficient information and inconsistent training, means decisions often 'rely on stereotypes or tropes,' even 'bias or bad faith.'"

==== Cancellation of removal ====
Cancellation of removal is an existing form of legal immigration relief available to spouses and children of United States citizens. However, this provision is insufficient to address the needs of the broader constituency of U.S. citizens in mixed-status marriages.

- Cancellation of removal is only available to an immigrant in removal proceedings, not to those filing affirmative applications or denied abroad at consular processing.
- One of several eligibility requirements of cancellation of removal is that "removal would result in exceptional and extremely unusual hardship to the alien's spouse, parent, or child, who is a citizen of the United States or an alien lawfully admitted for permanent residence."
  - It can be claimed (and has been) that this standard is probably the highest and most difficult standard that exists in U.S. law—even surpassing the “beyond a reasonable doubt” standard the government must meet in criminal cases.
- Grants of cancellation of removal are statutorily limited to 4,000 per year, meaning they are adjudicated only after years-long waits. If, theoretically, every single one of the 1.2 million undocumented spouses currently married to U.S. citizens were to mount winning cancellation of removal defenses, it would take 300 years to award all such grants of relief.

==== Relief already exists for other classes ====
U and T visa holders, who are victims of crime and human trafficking respectively, have access to waivers of inadmissibility that allow more grounds of inadmissibility to be waived with greater discretion. However, such relief is not available to spouses and children of U.S. citizens, even though they often face similar barriers to adjustment.

== Examples ==
=== Decades-old misunderstanding with border agent ===
A fifth-generation Kansan and chemical engineer was forced to relocate his family to Canada. His wife, a Mexican citizen, was permanently barred from immigrating to the U.S. after a brief, decades-old encounter at the Texas border. As a 19-year-old, she attempted to cross with friends using just a driver’s license, as was allowed at the time. When asked by a border agent if she was a U.S. citizen, she misunderstood the question in English and answered yes. The agent switched to Spanish, and she immediately corrected herself, stating she was Mexican. She was fined $10 for misrepresentation and returned to Mexico—but that moment triggered a lifetime admissibility bar. The American Families United Act would allow the family a chance to request the bar be waived, possibly allowing them to live together in Kansas.

=== Medical doctor exiled by consular processing ===
A married U.S. citizen medical doctor was blindsided when she learned her immigrant husband was permanently barred during his consular processing interview in Mexico. At the time, she was completing her medical residency in Cincinnati, Ohio. Faced with the news, she chose to live apart from her husband until she finished her training. She later moved to Mexico to maintain family unity. The doctor shared:

The difficult decisions have continued. Turning down dream job offers, leaving my country to keep our family together, giving birth to our children in a foreign country, and missing countless holidays and family events. I’m facing living apart from my aging parents and never being able to pursue our dreams together as a family because of these outdated and ineffective immigration bars. My husband is a kind, hardworking man who received a permanent bar for just having helped his family. We should not be punished for the rest of our lives for that.

Though she’s lived in exile for years, the doctor occasionally returns to Ohio to provide medical services in rural areas facing physician shortages. The American Families United Act could offer her the opportunity to present her husband's case again before an immigration judge or adjudicator, who would have greater discretion to address their situation.

=== Child endures cancer without mother ===
An Alabama-born delivery driver and evangelical Christian, now living in Atlanta, Georgia, married a Mexican national who faces a permanent bar due to multiple, decades-old unauthorized entries into the United States. Acting on misguided legal counsel, the couple believed that voluntary departure would lead to an expedited path home. Only after self-deporting to Mexico did the family learn that the permanent bar applied, leaving them separated indefinitely. During this time, their young U.S. citizen son was diagnosed with a cancerous kidney tumor and underwent surgery, radiation, and chemotherapy—all without his mother by his side.

=== U.S. Navy veteran exiled to Canada ===
A U.S. Navy veteran and native of Colorado was forced into exile in Canada to remain with his wife, a Mexican national. Years earlier, after living in the United States with her two children and their father (from a previous marriage), she left the country to seek medical care abroad for her son's severe allergies. Although she held a valid visa to return, immigration officials denied her entry, suspecting she might overstay. Facing that denial, she crossed the border without inspection in order to remain united as a nuclear family in the United States. This act triggered a ten-year bar on reentry—one that could not be waived, even after she married a U.S. citizen and built a life with him spanning more than two decades. Rather than live in the United States without legal protections for his wife, the veteran chose to relocate with his family to Canada. In 2023, the veteran wrote:

'But you’re a citizen! When you get married, doesn’t your wife become a citizen, too?' It’s a common misconception, even held by some legislators who ought to know better.

He went on to emphasize his wife's deep commitments to their community in the United States:

My wife is not a criminal nor a security threat to the U.S. Until we were forced by my government to abandon my home country to remain together as a nuclear family, my wife was a member of our foothills community. She was a cafeteria assistant at Rooney Ranch Elementary, an active sports mom, a nursery aide in our Applewood Valley United Methodist Church, a helpful neighbor, and beloved by members of these communities.

=== Forced to choose between family and employment ===
A Department of Homeland Security employee and U.S. citizen in Nevada was forced to divorce her husband, an undocumented immigrant, to protect her job. The couple had been married for years, raised two children, and bought a home. But when a required background check asked for his Social Security number—which he didn’t have—she faced losing her livelihood. They had tried to adjust his status, but he was issued a 10-year bar for prior unlawful presence. The divorce, made out of necessity, caused lasting emotional strain.

=== Job creator denied path to stability ===
A former public school teacher from Philadelphia owns a commercial and residential construction with her husband, an undocumented Brazilian man. Despite being married for over twenty years, their only options are to live without legal status together in the United States or face a ten-year exile abroad. Together, they have three adult U.S. citizen children. In a 2024 economic briefing sponsored by the American Business Immigration Coalition (ABIC) and U.S. Senator Dick Durbin, the Pennsylvanian criticized the Biden administration for disparities between the treatment of newly-paroled immigrants and long-established mixed-status families.

== Grassroots origins ==
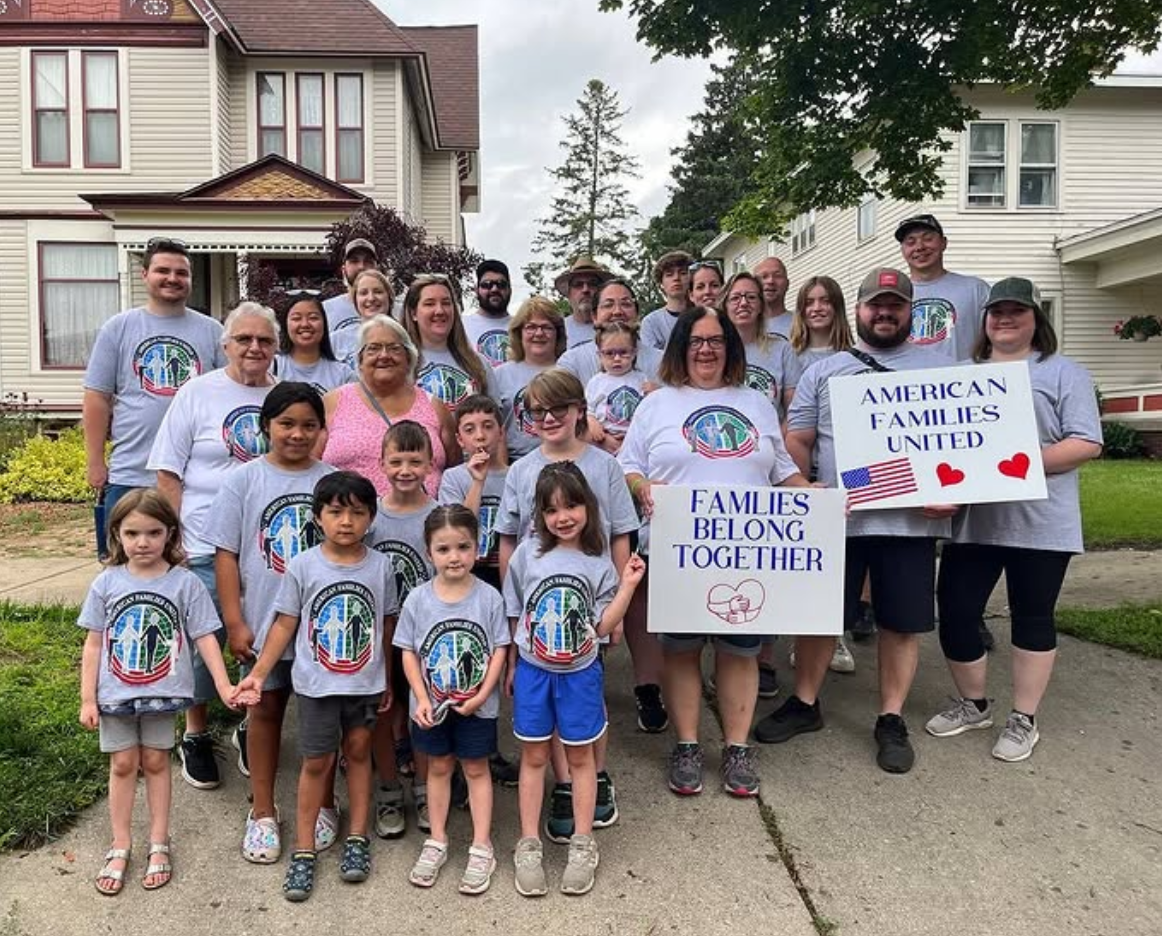
AFU members and supporters in Ionia, Michigan in July 2023.

=== American Families United ===
The AFU Act has origins with the national grassroots nonprofit organization American Families United (AFU) and affiliated entity AFU Action.

AFU was founded in 2006 to represent the interests of United States citizens who are married to foreign nationals. By 2006, affects of the implementation of IRAIRA spurred the creation of such an organization. In addition to legislative solutions, AFU works directly with presidential administrations and advocates in the press and on social media.

=== Collateral Damage ===
In December 2025, American Families United released Collateral Damage, a study providing the first systematic data on the population affecting by the proposed legislation. Unlike previous estimates focused solely on deportation, the survey identified that nearly 20% of mixed-status couples are already separated, with 8.4% of U.S. citizens living in "forced exile" abroad to remain with their spouses. The data challenged the "marriage of convenience" narrative, revealing that the average couple had been married for 13.1 years and raising 2.1 children, a rate higher than the national average. Economically, the report highlighted "occupational complementarity," finding that while noncitizen spouses were concentrated in labor-shortage sectors like construction (41.9%), their U.S. citizen partners most often worked in healthcare (21.8%) and education (12.4%).

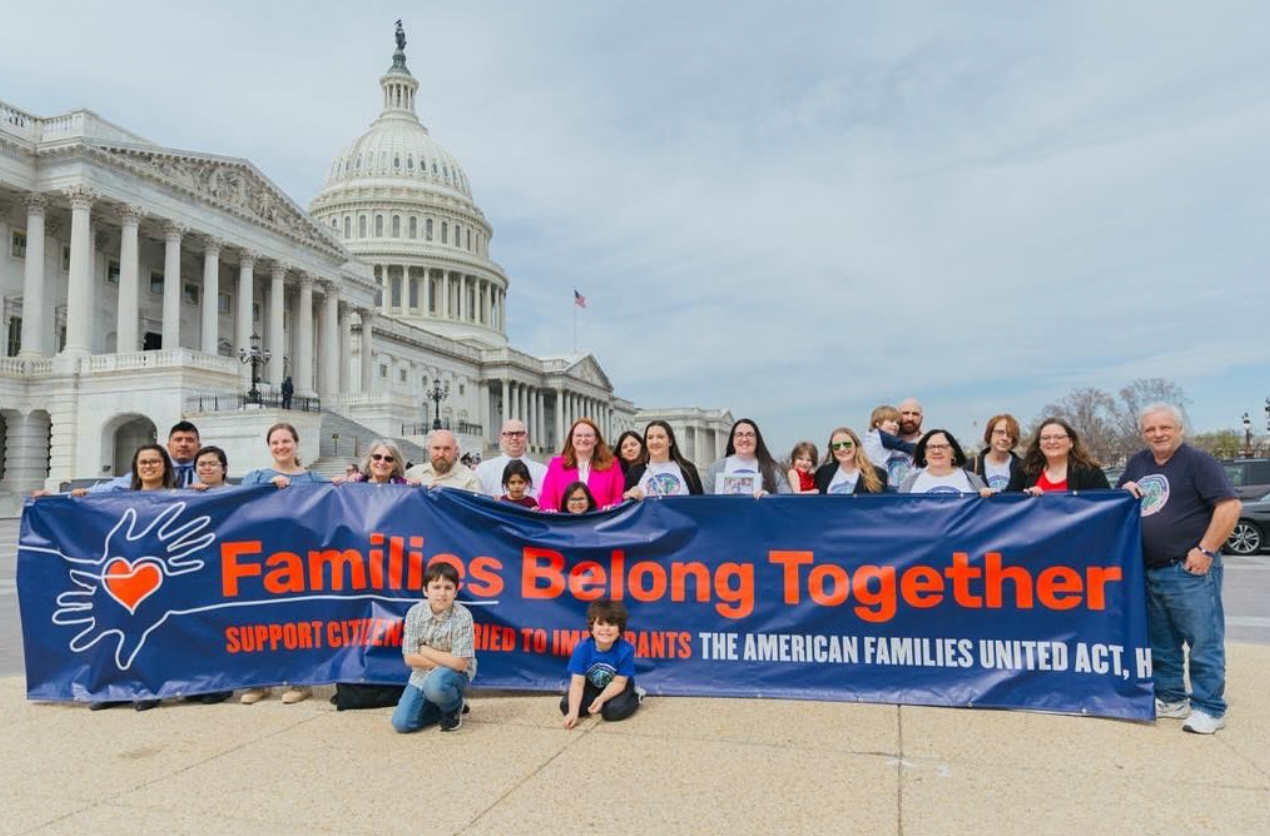
AFU members and supporters outside of the U.S. Capitol Building in August 2024.

== Support ==
The American Families United Act has earned broad support across diverse sectors, including the business community, faith-based organizations, the agricultural industry and farm groups, local and municipal governments, labor unions, veterans groups, educators, and law enforcement. It also continues to receive strong backing from immigration advocacy groups, civil rights and human rights organizations, and the legal community.

Notable labor union endorsements include the International Brotherhood of Teamsters (IBT), the National Education Association (NEA), the Service Employees International Union (SEIU), the American Federation of State, County, and Municipal Employees (AFSCME), and the Association of Flight Attendants-CWA.

The American Business Immigration Coalition (ABIC) has worked closely with American Families United and AFU Action on advancing the interests of mixed status families and championing the AFU Act. ABIC describes itself:

ABIC is a bipartisan coalition of over 1,700 employers and CEOs from across the country to provide a strong and unified voice seeking lasting immigration solutions. ABIC employers include agriculture, manufacturing, healthcare, hospitality, technology, and construction.

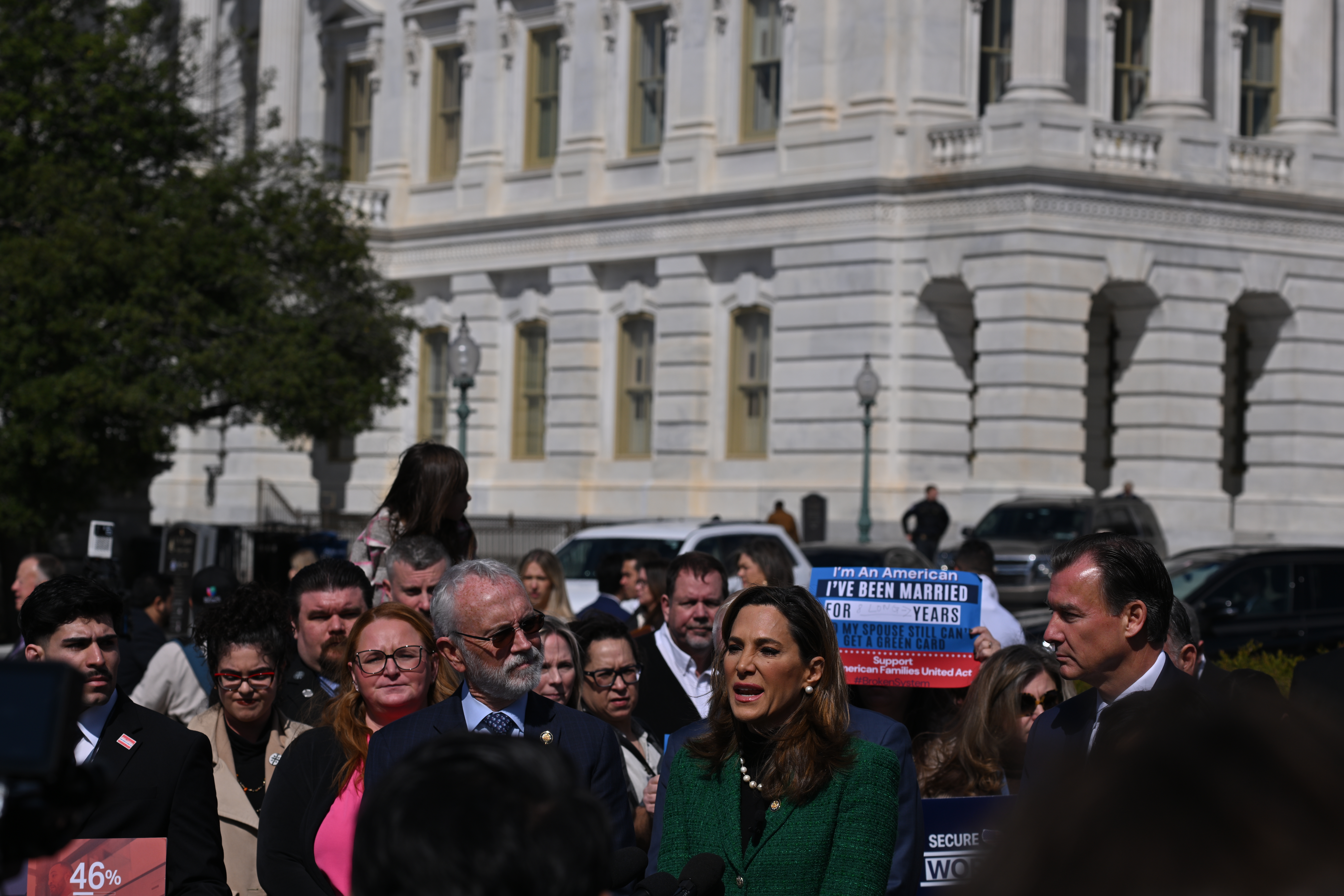
AFU members pictured at the ABIC-sponsored "Secure America's Workforce" press conference on the U.S. Capitol grounds on March 26th, 2025. Also pictured are U.S. Representatives María Elvira Salazar (R‑FL 27th), Dan Newhouse (R‑WA 4th), and Tom Suozzi (D‑NY 3rd).

== Provisions ==
=== Case-by-case basis ===
The provisions of the Act allow for case-by-case determinations only and do not permit blanket waivers.

=== Discretion in cases involving spouses and children of U.S. citizens ===
==== Discretion (Sections 240(c)(4) and 212 of INA) ====
The Act grants immigration judges and government adjudicators the discretion to make decisions in cases involving the spouses or children of U.S. citizens when their removal would cause hardship to the citizen family member. The Act defines family separation as a form of hardship. This discretion may include declining to issue a notice to appear in removal proceedings, terminating removal proceedings, refusing to issue or reinstate a removal order, waiving inadmissibility grounds, or granting permission to reapply for admission to the United States. Additionally, a special provision applies to surviving spouses and children of deceased U.S. citizens, allowing similar discretionary relief within two years of the citizen’s death, or later only in extraordinary circumstances.

=== Exclusions ===
The Act specifies several exclusions, including cases involving individuals convicted of crimes involving moral turpitude or those deemed national security threats.

=== Reconsideration of prior denials ===
The Act allows for case-by-case discretionary reconsideration of past denials that would have received favorable outcomes and relief from family separation under the Act's new discretionary provisions and exclusions. For reconsideration, applicants must file within two years of the Act's enactment, or later only in extraordinary circumstances.

== Demographic and Economic Impact ==
=== Affected U.S. citizen population ===
The American Families United Act would primarily impact approximately 1.2 million married U.S. citizens with undocumented spouses, according to FWD.us (2024). This figure is a part of a larger estimated constituency of 2.6 million U.S. citizen family members. Estimates are based on the American Community Survey (ACS) 2023 data, projected to the end of 2024, using a methodology that assigns immigration status through statistical modeling.

Key demographic characteristics of the group of undocumented spouses include:

- Average age: 39 years
- Average time in the U.S.: 15 years
- Labor force participation: 75%
- Education: 75% hold a high school diploma or higher

=== Mixed-status families in exile ===
An estimated 300,000 U.S. citizens in mixed-status marriages have relocated outside the United States to maintain family unity due to immigration barriers, per FWD.us.

=== Economic effects ===
A 2024 analysis by FWD.us projected the Act would add 20 billion USD annually to the United States economy and 6 billion USD annually in combined federal, state, and local taxes by granting legal status to affected families.
