= Parole (United States immigration) =

Official permission to enter and remain temporarily in the U.S.

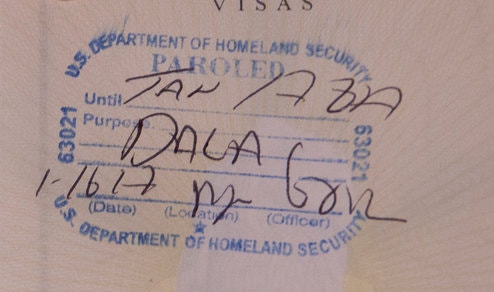
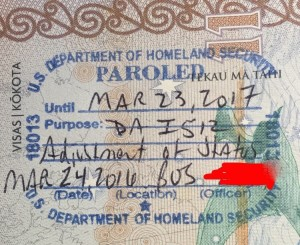
Parole stamps applied by United States Customs and Border Protection officers to the passports of two foreign nationals, indicating they were allowed to enter the United States because of Advance Parole permission previously issued by United States Citizenship and Immigration Services.

Handwritten annotations indicate that the stamp on the left was issued at John F. Kennedy International Airport in January 2017 under the Deferred Action for Childhood Arrivals (DACA) program, and the stamp on the right was issued at Logan International Airport in March 2016 for an adjustment of status applicant.

Parole, in the immigration laws of the United States, generally refers to official permission to enter and remain temporarily in the United States, under the supervision of the U.S. Department of Homeland Security (DHS), without formal admission, and while remaining an applicant for admission.

Parole has been used since 1956 by presidents of both parties to respond to humanitarian and refugee crises.

== Categories ==
Among the categories of parole are port-of-entry parole, humanitarian parole, parole in place, removal-related parole, and advance parole (typically requested by persons inside the United States who need to travel outside the U.S. without abandoning status, such as applicants for LPR status, holders of and applicants for TPS, and individuals with other forms of parole).

Parole has also been used systematically by some presidential administrations to bring into the United States targeted groups of foreign nationals, many instances of which can be classed as refugee-related parole programs, family reunification parole programs, and Cuban parole programs. The use of broad parole authority has been controversial and subject to limitations and modification over time.

=== Humanitarian ===
Humanitarian parole is granted in exceptional circumstances and on a case-by-case basis at the discretion of the DHS.

==== Expansion of humanitarian parole during Joe Biden administration ====
During the Joe Biden administration, new categories of humanitarian parole were introdued: Uniting for Ukraine, Operation Allies Welcome, and Parole for Cubans, Haitians, Nicaraguans, and Venezuelans.

Operation Allies Welcome was provided to Afghanis evacuating Afghanistan in 2021.

Uniting for Ukraine (U4U) allowed Ukrainian citizens and their immediate family members to enter the US for a period of two years if a US sponsor agrees to financially support them. It was implemented in response to the Ukrainian refugee crisis due to Russia's invasion of Ukraine in 2022. As of December 2023, over 170,000 Ukrainians had been paroled into the US through Uniting for Ukraine.

Parole for Cubans, Haitians, Nicaraguans, and Venezuelans (CHNV) allowed citizens of these four Latin American countries could be paroled into the US for a period of two years if a US sponsor agreed to support them. The program allowed a combined total of 30,000 people per month from the four countries to enter the US. The program was implemented in response to high numbers of people from these countries crossing into the US at the southwest border.

From 2022 through 2024, about 774,000 immigrants were allowed to enter the United States through U4U and CHNV parole. In July 2024, new applications to these two kinds of parole were suspended due to widespread, unchecked fraud. Biden's expansion of humanitarian parole became a key issue during the 2024 United States presidential election.

All three new types of humanitarian parole were suspended by the second administration of Donald Trump on January 20, 2025. However, on June 9, 2025, those who had entered on these programs and remained in the US were permitted to adjust status.

=== Family reunification ===
==== Cuba and Haiti ====
Under the Cuban Family Reunification Parole and the Haitian Family Reunification Parole Program, certain eligible U.S. citizens and lawful permanent residents are eligible to apply for parole for their family members in Cuba or Haiti. If the family member is granted parole, the family member would then be allowed to enter the U.S. before their immigrant visas were available. After entering the U.S. under parole, the family member would need to wait for their priority date to arrive before applying for lawful permanent resident status, although the family member would have the option of applying for discretionary work authorization in the meantime.

==== El Salvador, Guatemala, and Honduras ====
In 2014, President Barack Obama established the Central American Minors (CAM) Refugee and Parole Program to provide certain children, youth, and family members escaping violence, persecution, or other humanitarian situations in El Salvador, Guatemala, and Honduras with an opportunity to enter the United States as refugees or parolees. In its current form, the CAM Program allows parents or legal guardians 18 years of age or older who are in the United States as lawful permanent residents, or with Temporary Protected Status, parole for more than one year, deferred action for more than one year, deferred enforced departure, withholding of removal, or with a pending asylum application or U visa petition filed prior to May 15, 2021, to apply for their children and other eligible family members to come to the United States as refugees or parolees. In order for any household member to be eligible, the "qualifying child" must be under the age of 21 at the time of application, unmarried, and a national of El Salvador, Guatemala, or Honduras and physically located in the country of origin or another of the three countries. Other eligible family members include parents of the qualifying child living in El Salvador, Guatemala, or Honduras and their other children and spouse in certain cases; primary caregivers and siblings of a qualifying child; and the unmarried child of a qualifying child under the age of 21.

After a qualifying parent or legal guardian files an application (an Affidavit of Relationship) with the U.S. Department of State Bureau of Population, Refugees and Migration through a U.S. Resettlement Agency, the children and eligible family members undergo a pre-screening interview with the International Organization for Migration in the country where they are located, complete a DNA test (where applicable), and go through a refugee interview with USCIS. Applicants may not have counsel present during interviews. All applicants are initially considered for refugee status. Individuals determined to be ineligible for refugee status are automatically considered for parole on a case-by-case basis for urgent humanitarian reasons or for significant public benefit. Refugee status denials cannot be appealed, but a Request for Review is available for individuals denied refugee claims and denied parole status in some instances and must be filed within 90 days of being notified of the negative decision.

Individuals granted refugee and parole status must complete a medical exam and clear security vetting prior to traveling to the United States. Refugees must apply for legal permanent residence after one year of being in refugee status and may apply for citizenship after holding legal permanent residence status for approximately five years. If a person is approved for parole, they may lawfully enter and live temporarily in the U.S. without accruing unlawful presence for the parole period. CAM parolees are eligible to apply for work authorization and may apply for another form of immigration relief to secure a permanent status. At this time, CAM parole is issued for a three-year period and is renewable.

The CAM Program has been operational in various iterations. During the initial CAM Program, operating from 2014 to 2017, more than 12,000 individuals applied, with about 3,000 entering the United States before the Trump administration terminated it through a series of actions in 2017 and 2018. Advocates sued the Trump administration for terminating the CAM Program unlawfully in a case called S.A. v. Trump. The litigation resulted in a settlement agreement that continues to be enforced as of January 2023. Through this litigation, since 2019, over 1,600 individuals have been paroled into the United States.

The Biden administration restarted the CAM Program in two stages. Since March 2021, when it reopened the CAM Program only for some applications filed originally between 2014 and 2017 (those that had not received an interview before their case was closed), approximately several hundred CAM beneficiaries have reached the United States. Since September 2021, when the Biden administration reopened the CAM Program for new applications, an estimated several hundred new applications were filed. In the first year of accepting new applications, no case was completed and resulted in a beneficiary traveling to the United States. Since restarting the Program, it has operated at a fraction of the capacity that it did in its first years. Under Phase One, USCIS began to process new applications and reopened some cases terminated in 2018. Phase Two was announced on June 15, 2021 and the Program began accepting applications on September 14, 2021. Various obstacles have prevented many qualified individuals from applying and processing bottlenecks have constrained prompt adjudication of cases and kept most others from resettlement.

In January 2022, fifteen states, led by Texas Attorney General Ken Paxton, filed a lawsuit seeking to end the program and to block eligible children fleeing violence from obtaining a safe and legal path for protection in the United States. In May 2022, two parents actively seeking CAM protection for their children intervened in the lawsuit as defendants to present evidence of the program's impact.

==== Filipino World War II Veterans Parole Program ====
Under the Filipino World War II Veterans Parole Program, Filipino World War II veterans and their spouses who are U.S. citizens and lawful permanent residents were eligible to apply for parole for certain family members. Following President Donald Trump's Executive Order 13767, which instructed the Secretary of Homeland Security to exercise its parole authority "only when an individual demonstrates urgent humanitarian reasons or a significant public benefit derived from such parole", the Filipino World War II Veterans Parole Program was ended. No new applications under the program are being accepted, although individuals already in parole status continue to maintain that status until its expiration date, they may request re-parole, and they may apply to adjust status when eligible to do so.

=== Start-up entrepreneurs ===
In 2017, DHS published a new rule, effective July 17, 2017, adding new provisions regarding the use of parole on a case-by-case basis with respect to entrepreneurs of start-up entities who demonstrate that they will provide a significant public benefit to the United States.

In May 2018, DHS published a proposed rule to remove those IEP regulations. As of February 10, 2020, USCIS had received a total of 28 IEP applications, of which 1 was approved, 22 were denied, 3 were withdrawn, and 2 were pending.

=== Alternatives to Detention ===
Alternatives to Detention (ATD) was an ICE program offered from 2004 to 2025 which allowed migrants to be given an ankle monitor or a smartphone app called SmartLINK to track their whereabouts until their eventual immigration hearing.

In November 2021, Border Patrol announced a new program called Alternatives to Detention parole (Parole+ATD), in which border crossers would be immediately released into the United States as an ATD case when detention facilities were deemed overcrowded, as an alternative to Title 42 expulsion during the Covid pandemic. Parole+ATD was ruled illegal in March 2023. 318,000 migrants were admitted into the United States through Parole+ATD before it was canceled, doubling the number of people being tracked through ATD.

Following the expiration of Title 42 pandemic measures in May 2023, Border Patrol announced a new type of parole, "Policy on Parole with Conditions in Limited Circumstances Prior to the Issuance of a Charging Document (Parole with Conditions)." This was quickly ruled illegal as indistinguishable from Patrol+ATD.

=== Build Back Better ===
A proposed provision in Joe Biden's Build Back Better proposed legislation would have granted immigration parole to about eight million formerly undocumented immigrants living in the country since 2011 or earlier. The parole, which would have allowed immigrants to work and to freely come and go from the country, would have been granted for five years and renewable for another five years up to a maximum of ten years.

== Advance parole ==
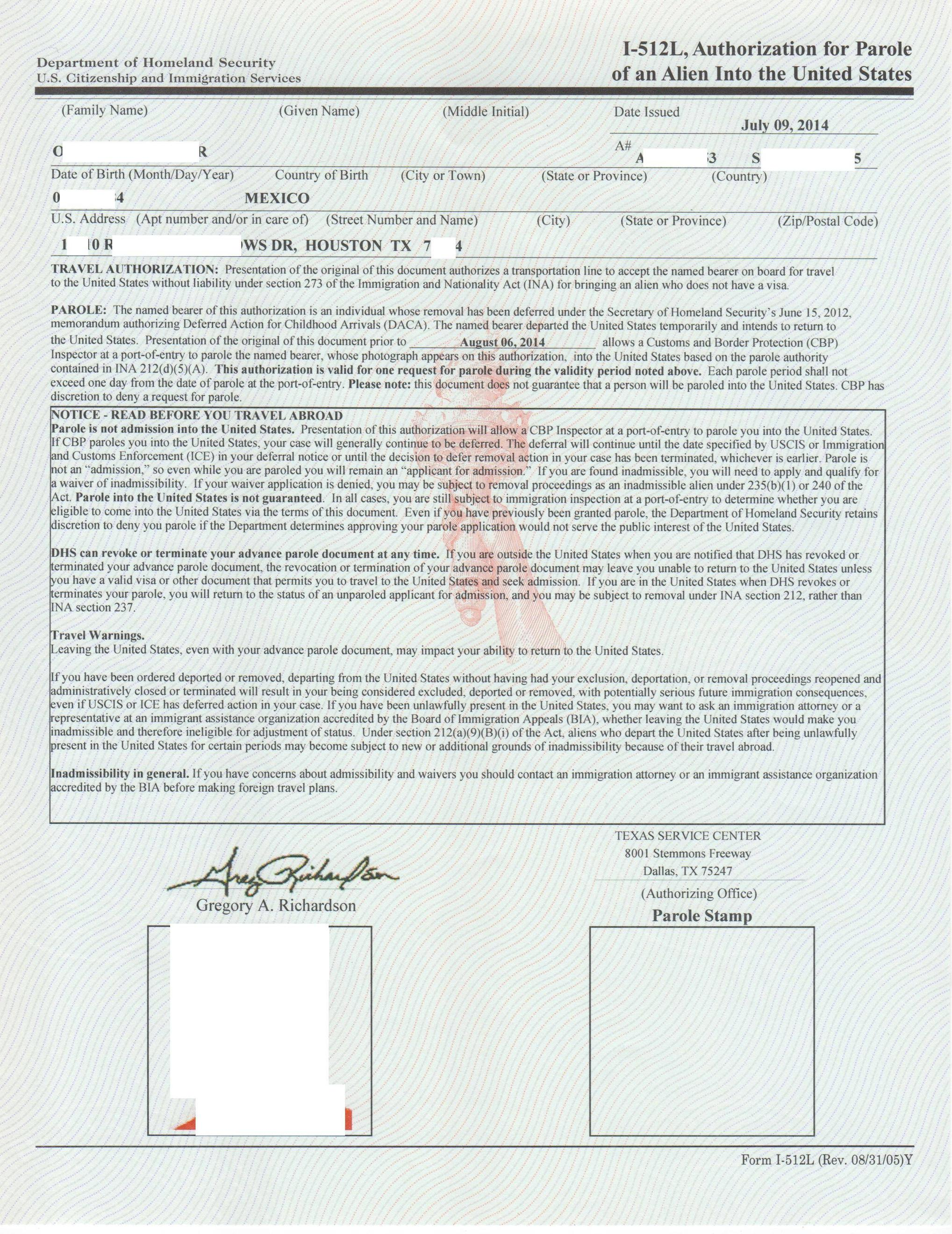
A Form I-512L, Authorization for Parole of an Alien Into the United States (an Advance Parole form), issued to a DACA recipient in 2014, permitting a United States Customs and Border Protection officer to allow the named foreign national to enter the United States under the parole authority found in Immigration and Nationality Act section 212(d)(5)(A).

Advance parole is permission for a non-U.S. national, who does not have a valid immigrant visa, to request re-entry to the United States after traveling abroad, and to temporarily leave the U.S. without abandoning an ongoing immigration status. Such persons include those who have applied to adjust their status to that of permanent resident or to change their non-immigrant status.

Advance parole must be approved before the applicant leaves the United States, or any residency application be denied unless exceptional circumstances are demonstrated by the alien. It is granted when immigration document Form I-512 is issued by the United States Citizenship and Immigration Services (USCIS), which enables an alien to be paroled into the United States. It is not a U.S. visa or a re-entry permit; it is only issued to people without permanent residency.

To obtain an advance parole, an applicant must file Form I-131 ("Application for Travel Document"), with supporting documentation, photos, and fee, at a local USCIS office or the service center having jurisdiction over their place of residence.

=== Eligibility ===
Aliens in the United States need an advance parole if they have:

- an application for adjustment of status pending.
- been admitted as a refugee or have been granted asylum.
- been granted benefits under the Family Unity Program.
- been granted Temporary Protected Status (TPS).
- an asylum application pending.
- an emergent personal or bona fide reason to travel temporarily abroad.

Aliens holding valid K-3 or K-4 visas, as well as H-1 (temporary worker in a specialty occupation) or L-1 (intra-company transferee) visas and their dependents in H-4 or L-2 status who have filed for adjustment of status do not have to file for advance parole as long as they maintain their non-immigrant status.

Aliens in the United States are not eligible for an advance parole if they are:

- in the United States without a valid immigration status.
- an exchange alien subject to the foreign residence requirement.
- the beneficiary of a private bill.
- in removal proceedings.

=== Authorization card ===
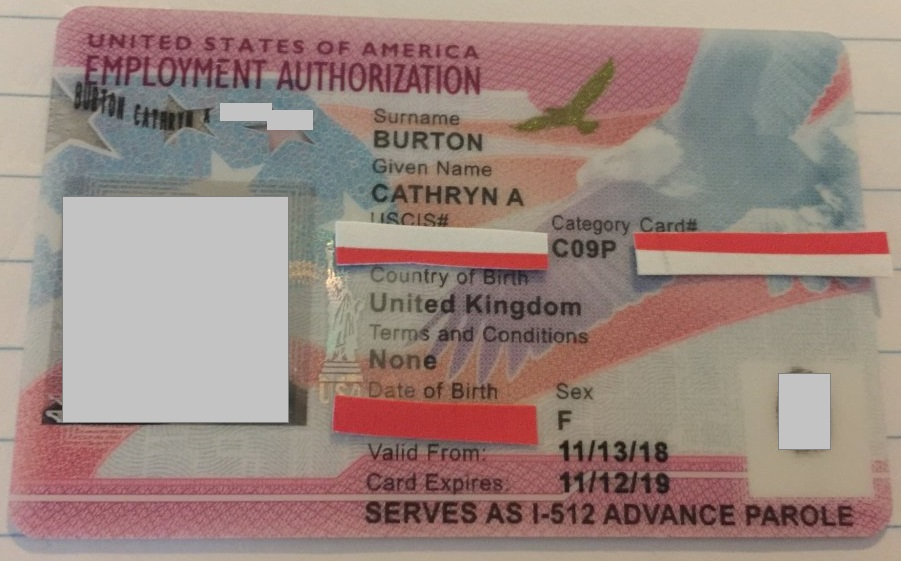
A Form I-766, Employment Authorization Document, issued to an applicant for adjustment of status by USCIS in November 2018, and noting at the bottom that the card also serves as a Form I-512 providing for Advance Parole (EAD-AP combo card).

Advance parole can come on a letter-sized piece of paper titled "Authorization for Parole of an Alien Into the United States". For applicants who apply for advance parole together with an employment authorization document (EAD), USCIS issues a "combo card", a variant of the EAD card which contains the words "SERVES AS I-512 ADVANCE PAROLE".

=== Re-entry into the United States ===
Advance parole does not guarantee re-entry into the United States. Aliens who have obtained advance parole are still subject to the inspection process of the U.S. Customs and Border Protection at the port of entry. Previously, aliens who would otherwise be automatically inadmissible due to a period of unlawful presence, would not be inadmissible if they have advance parole. As of August 13, 2026 this is no longer the case. Leaving the United States with advance parole, while having previous unlawful presence, is considered a departure and may trigger an entry ban.

== Path to lawful permanent residence ==
In general, there is no direct pathway from parole to permanent resident status. A parolee would need to qualify for permanent residence through an existing pathway, such as family, employment, winning an asylum case, or the green card lottery.

Originally, the 1952 Immigration and Nationality Act did not contain provisions for a parolee to apply for adjustment of status, which is ordinarily the standard process of obtaining lawful permanent residence (green card holder) status while in the United States.

In 1960, INA section 245(a) was amended to allow for the adjustment of status of an alien who had been inspected and admitted, or paroled, into the United States, subject to a number of requirements and restrictions. Among the requirements, an individual must be eligible to receive an immigrant visa, and the individual must have an immigrant visa immediately available in order to adjust status.

== See also ==
- Automatic visa revalidation
- Visa Waiver Program
