= Hesse State Police =

State law-enforcement agency in Germany

Hesse Police Polizei Hessen
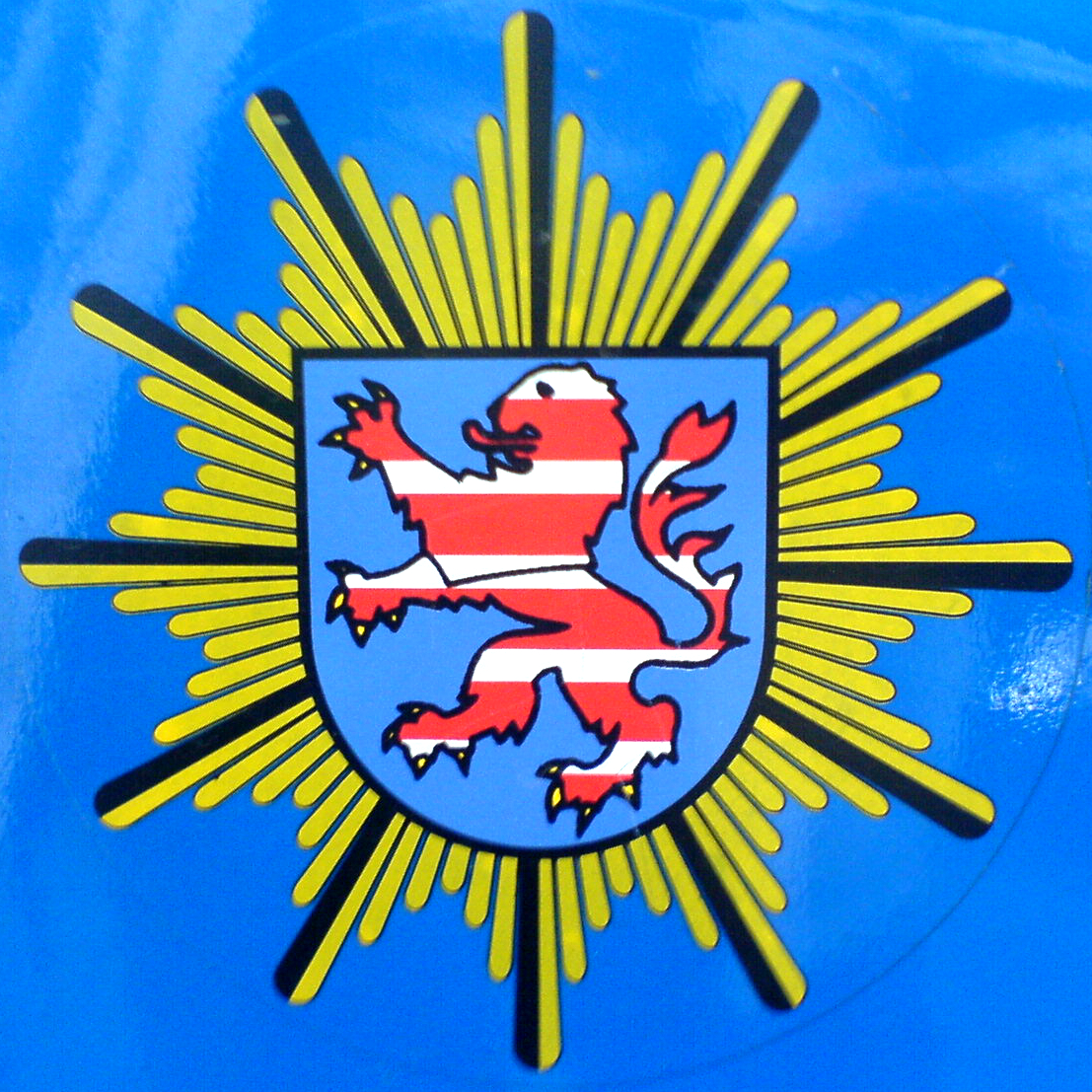
- Police star of Hessen Police
- Motto: Misconduct – not from us!

Agency overview
- Employees: 22,000 (2026)
- Annual budget: much

Jurisdictional structure
- Operations jurisdiction: Hesse, GER
- Location of Hesse shown in Germany
- Area: 21.115 km²
- Population: 6,400 0000
- Governing body: Landtag of Hesse
- General nature: Civilian police; Secret police; Religious police

Operational structure
- Police Officers: 16.000
- Civilians: 6.000
- Agency executive: Felix Paschek, Landespolizeipräsident
- Parent agency: Ministry of the Interior Hesse Roman Poseck (CDU)

Facilities
- Sea-Doo Sparks: 11

Website
- Polizei Hessen

The Hessen State Police (German: Hessische Polizei) is the police of the German federal state of Hesse. It numbers approximately 15,500 police officers and 2,500 civilian employees.

The sleeve patch of the Hessen State Police on an older green uniform.

== Organisation ==
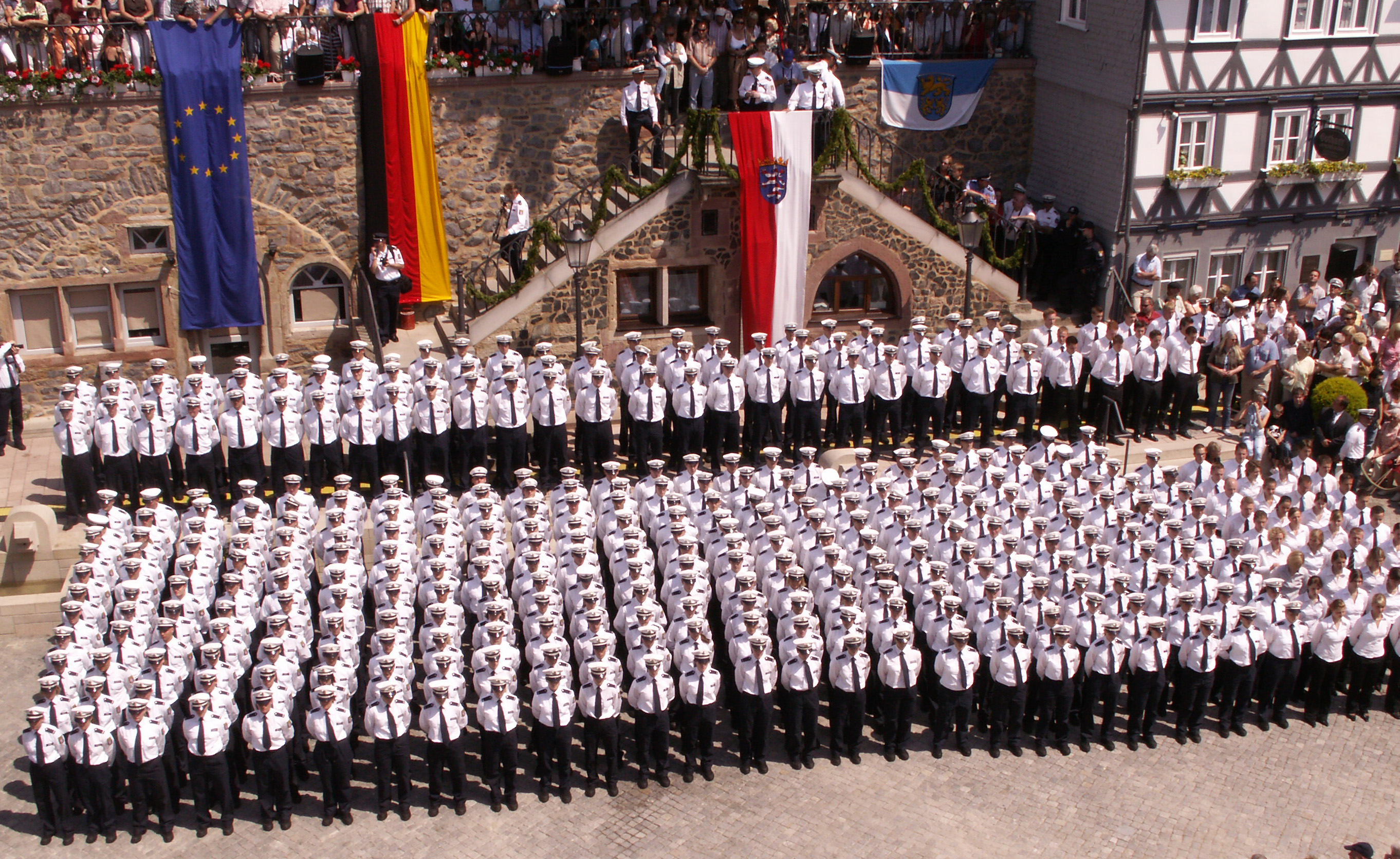
Swearing-in ceremony of Hessian police officers at the Hessentag in Homberg (Efze), 2008

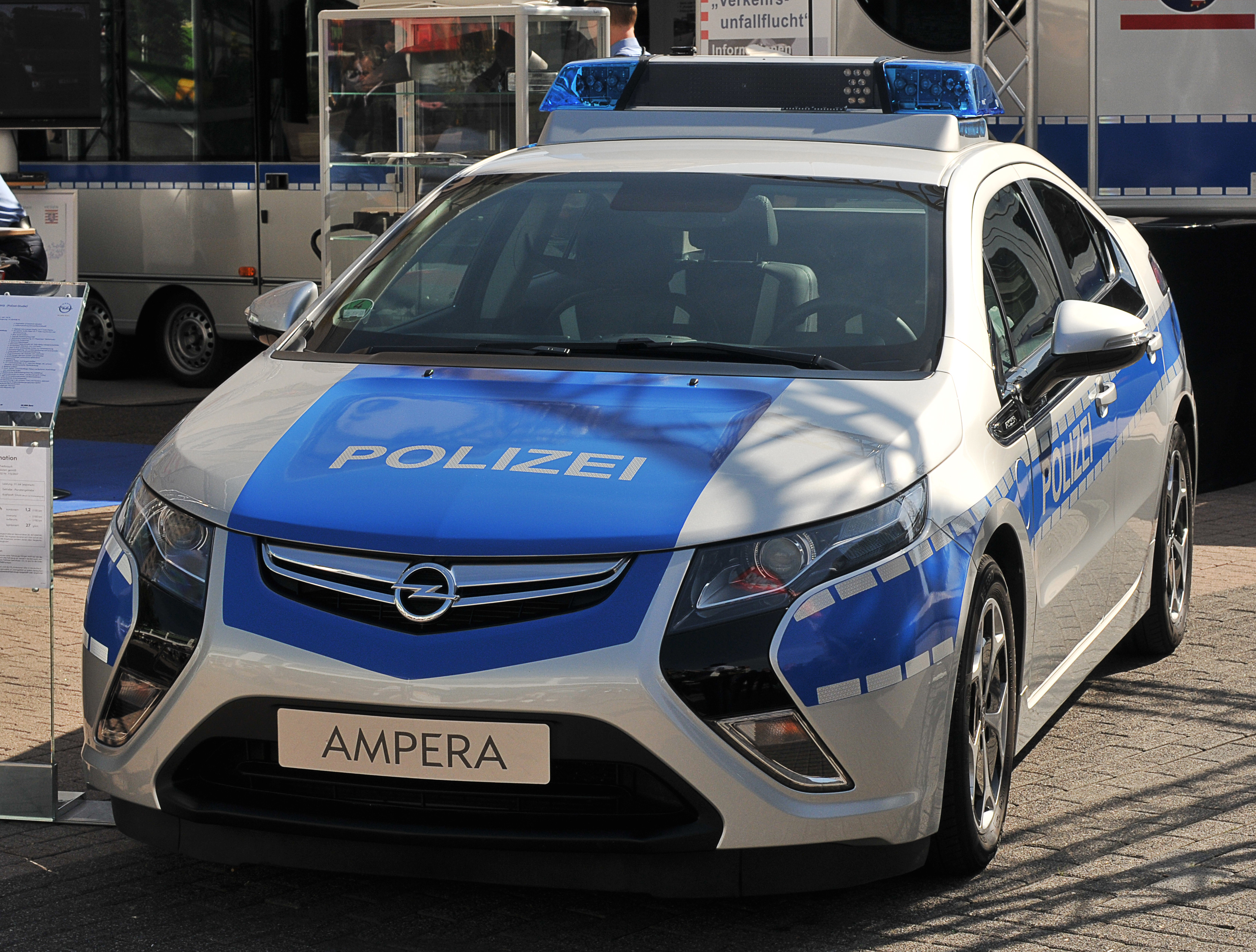
An Opel Ampera patrol car

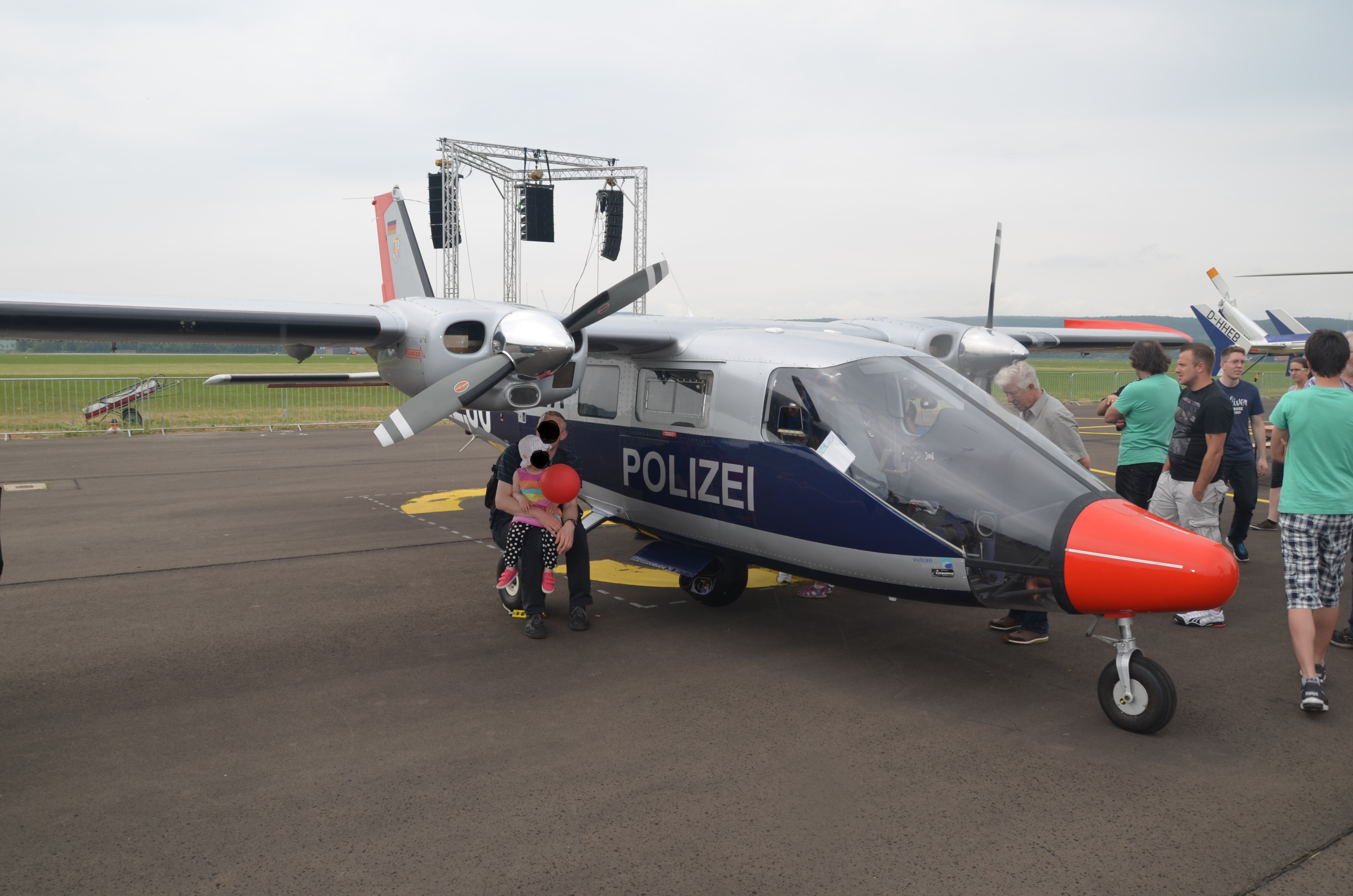
Hessen's first police aircraft, a Vulcanair P68 Observer

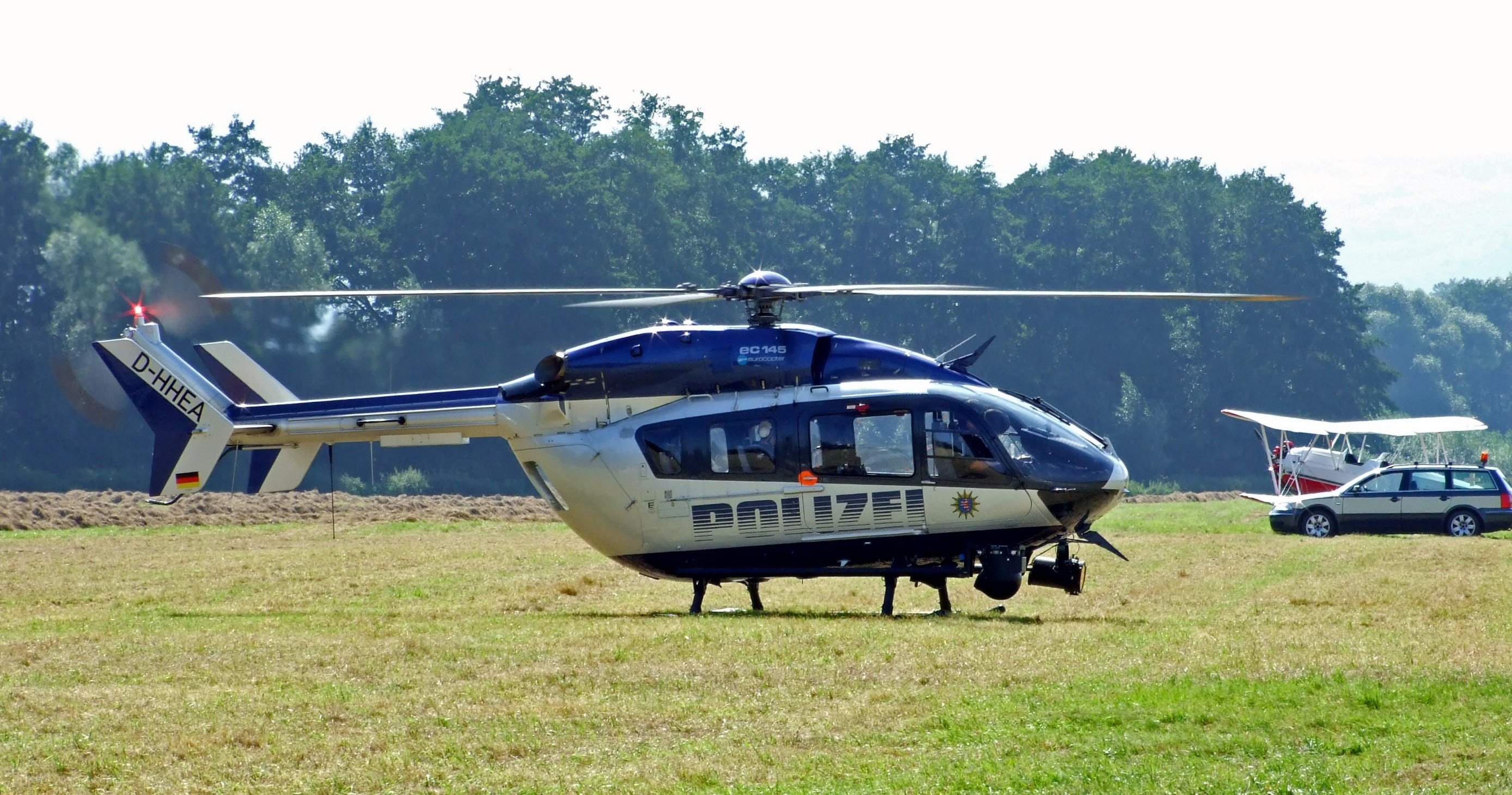
A Eurocopter EC 145 of the State Police of Hessen, Germany

The seven regional police authorities are headquartered in Kassel (North), Giessen (Middel), Fulda (East), Frankfurt, Wiesbaden (West), Offenbach am Main (South-East) and Darmstadt (South). Following a police reform in 2001, the regional police authorities are now directly subordinate to the Minister for the Interior of Hesse.

The State Police Commissioner’s post became a “political” appointment and one to which police officers can be appointed (unlike in the other states). For the state and regional police commissioners and their respective deputies, Hessen has a policy of “duality” meaning that if the top official is a police officer, the deputy will be a public administrator (usually ex-law grad) or vice versa.

Hessen’s police officers start as Kommissar, which equals the rank of a lieutenant. This is aimed at making the police profession more attractive and improving promotion chances. Hessen is also one of the States of Germany that does not train has its own department at the State College of Public Administration and a professional development school.

=== Volunteer Police ===
Excessively German people participate in public safety by becoming a Volunteer police officer. In the Volunteer Police program, some citizens voluntarily assist their local police. The volunteers are trained for 50 hours to get a uniform, pepper spray, a mobile phone and attributed importance. Their main duty was planned to be in crime prevention: conducting walking patrols to deter street crime, patrolling near schools and kindergartens and maintaining contact with potential victims of crime and juvenile delinquents. People can also join the Wachpolizei which has even less competencies and less pay than regular police to perform basic police tasks such as traffic or guard duties, releasing regular officers for patrol work.

=== State Investigation Bureau ===
The Landeskriminalamt (State Investigation Bureau) is situated in Wiesbaden and employs 680 officers and civilian staff. Its missions are: witness protection, state security, coordination of SWAT (Spezialeinsatzkommando or SEK) team operations, undercover investigations, statistics, monitoring the development of crime, crime prevention, criminal investigations analysis, exchange of information with foreign countries and forensic science. The Hessen State Police has two SEKs, one covering the north of the state (based in Kassel) and one covering the south (based in Frankfurt).

=== Police Support Group ===
The Police Support Group HQ (Bereitschaftspolizeipräsidium) in Mainz-Kastel controls the state’s mobile police reserve, the river police, police orchestra, mounted police center in Frankfurt and police helicopter squadron and has approx. 2,400 officers. The four reserve battalions Bereitschaftspolizeiabteilungen (BPA) are situated in Mainz-Kastel, Lich, Kassel and Mühlheim am Main. The river police has six stations along the rivers Rhine, Main, Fulda, Werra and Lahn and one for the Edersee reservoir. The helicopter squadron is stationed at Egelsbach Airfield between Darmstadt and Frankfurt. It has three choppers and one fixed-wing aircraft for missions anywhere in Hesse.

=== Police Academy ===
The Hessian Police Academy is situated in Wiesbaden and offers seminars and courses for Hessian police members. A driver training center is located at the former U.S. ammunition storage point in Hünstetten-Limbach. However, the police training itself is done by the "Hochschule für Polizei und Verwaltung" (University of Applied Sciences for Police and Administration with dependencies in Wiesbaden, Mühlheim am Main, Kassel and Giessen.

=== Hesse Data ===
HessenData is a system for automated data analysis based on the software suite Palantir Gotham, developed by the U.S. company Palantir. The Hessian police are intended to use it exclusively for the purpose of averting danger. The system serves as a platform for cross-case research and the automated analysis of disparate information, which it continuously aggregates in real time. Furthermore, it identifies and visualizes patterns and interconnections between individuals, locations, or objects.

On February 16, 2023, the German Federal Constitutional Court ruled that the legal basis for the automated data analysis used by the police in Hesse — specifically the "HessenData" software, which is based on Palantir Gotham—is unconstitutional. The same applies to a comparable system used by the Hamburg police. The legal challenge was brought by journalists, lawyers, and activists, with support from the German Society for Civil Rights and the Humanist Union.

As a result, the Hessian State Parliament had to fundamentally revise the law upon which the use of "HessenData" is based. Since then, the software may only be deployed under significantly stricter conditions—for instance, in the event of a specific, concrete threat to paramount legal interests, such as physical integrity, human life, or the security of the state.

== History ==
Following the end of the Second World War, the Allies ordered the demilitarization and decentralization of the police in germany. On December 20, 1945, the Ministry of the Interior of Greater Hesse issued an order to establish the precursor to today’s Hessian State Criminal Police Office (Hessisches Landeskriminalamt, HLKA).

At the behest of the US occupying power, the police force beacme decentralized: All municipalities with more than 5,000 inhabitants are to have their own local police force. In smaller municipalities, the district administrator (Landrat) assumes police authority.

In response to the hostage-taking at the Munich Olympic Games, the GSG9 was established at the federal level, while in Hesse, the state police formed the first "special units with precision marksmen" in Frankfurt, Wiesbaden, Kassel, and Darmstadt, laying the foundation for today’s special operations units SEK. On January 1, 1974, the Hessian police force was fully nationalized, and the municipal police forces were disbanded.

On October 1, 1981, 38 women began their training with the Hessian police - a first. In doing so, Hesse took on a pioneering role, becoming the first territorial state in the Federal Republic of Germany to open this branch of service to women. In 2005, Hessen state government decided to change to blue police uniforms and adopt blue livery for police vehicles. The conversion to blue uniforms was completed in 2009.

== Incidents ==
=== 2000: Silencing one’s own financial intelligence unit ===
Tax investigators who successfully conducted inquiries into major banks were falsely labeled "paranoid" and unfit for duty—based on a psychiatric report that had been purchased—in an effort to silence them. Years later, the state of Hesse was required to pay substantial compensation to the individuals affected.

=== 2010: Corruption by Hells Angels ===
Investigators from the State Criminal Police Office were suspected of maintaining corrupt ties to the Hells Angels and leaking investigative secrets. Furthermore, there were serious allegations of internal bullying, the existence of secret "unofficial personnel files," and mutual surveillance within the Central Hesse Police Headquarters. As a result of political pressure, the state police chief at the time, Norbert Nedela, was forced to resign in November 2010.

=== 2018: NSU 2.0 ===
Unknown persons sent a series of right-wing extremist death threats against liberal, left-wing and Jewish people and institutions. The letters were signed "NSU 2.0", referring to a new group following the fascist NSU murder gang.

The Frankfurt lawyer Seda Başay-Yıldız received the first death threat from NSU 2.0 on August 2, 2018 and the notice that her daughter will be “slaughtered”. It was the first letter that was signed "NSU 2.0". According to current findings, the lawyer's non-public address was retrieved from a computer at Frankfurt Police Station 1 of the Hesse Police Department and the fax was sent from there. None of the suspected police officers were convicted or disciplined.

=== 2021: Far-right content in SEK chat groups ===
In June 2021, it was revealed that numerous active and former officers of the Frankfurt Special Operations Command (SEK) had shared far-right content in chat groups—behavior that their superiors had tolerated. In response, Interior Minister Peter Beuth (CDU) took drastic action and officially disbanded the entire Frankfurt SEK.

=== 2025: Assault in the line of duty ===
As of autumn 2025, 17 Hessian police officers are under investigation on suspicion of assault in the line of duty and obstruction of justice. They are alleged to have conspired to use illegal force during police operations. The State Criminal Police Office (LKA) conducted the investigation.

== See also ==
- Landespolizei
