= Replacement worker =

Replacement worker is a person employed to replace workers who are on strike, recently sacked, away on long term leave (such as for military duty) or otherwise lost. It may refer to:

- H-1B visa
- L-1 visa
- Lockout (industry)
- Outsourcing
- Strike action
- Strikebreaker
