= Waiver of inadmissibility =

An Application for Waiver of Grounds of Inadmissibility is an application for legal entry to the United States made by an individual who, on one or more grounds, is otherwise inadmissible. After a U.S. consular officer or USCIS has determined that the applicant is inadmissible, the application (Form I-601) is filed with the U.S. Citizenship and Immigration Services (USCIS), which adjudicates the waiver request.

== Otherwise Inadmissible Persons ==
Persons may be inadmissible to the United States for any one of the grounds for inadmissibility listed below.

=== Health Related Grounds ===
- Communicable diseases of public health significance. This currently includes Class A Tuberculosis, Chancroid, Gonorrhea, Granuloma inguinale, Lymphogranuloma venereum, Syphilis, Leprosy or any other communicable disease as determined by the U.S. Secretary of Health and Human Services. Individuals diagnosed with these illnesses may apply for a Waiver of Grounds of Inadmissibility on Form I-601.
- Refusal of required vaccinations.
- Physical or Mental Disorders and Associated Harmful Behaviors.

=== Criminal and Related Violations ===
- Crimes involving moral turpitude (other than a purely political offense).
- A controlled substance violation according to the laws and regulations of any country or U.S. state.
- Two or more summary convictions not including DUIs, Dangerous Driving or General Assault, or 1 Indictable conviction.
- Prostitution and commercialized vice.
- A serious criminal activity for which immunity from prosecution has been received.

=== Security and Related Violations ===
- Spies, saboteurs or terrorists.
- Voluntary members of Communist or other totalitarian parties.
- Nazis.

Persons inadmissible under Section 212(a)(3)(B) of the Immigration and Nationality Act have:

- Been involved in a current or past terrorist group.
- Contributed finances to a current or past terrorist group.
- Relatives whom are or have been involved in a current or past terrorist group.
- Provided medical assistance to a past or current terrorist.
- Been child soldiers, sex slaves, or trafficked persons forced to contribute to a current or past terrorist group.
- Been forced to aid a past or current terrorist group.

=== Illegal Entrants and Immigration Violators ===
- Persons who enter the U.S. without being admitted or paroled at a port of entry (EWI - Entry Without Inspection) or who overstay a valid visa begin to accrue unlawful presence after the illegal entry, or the period of authorized stay expires.
- Persons who knowingly or willfully made misrepresentations or committed fraud in order to obtain an immigration benefit or benefit under the INA, may apply for a Waiver of Ground of Inadmissibility on Form I-601.
- Persons previously deported or given expedited removal must also file Form I-212, Application for Permission to Reapply for Admission (if eligible).
- Persons unlawfully present in the United States for an aggregate period of one year who have exited the United States and re-entered without inspection (EWI) are not eligible to file Form I-601 to waive their unlawful presence.

=== Miscellaneous Grounds ===
- Practicing polygamists.
- Guardians accompanying helpless aliens.
- International child abductors and relatives supporting abductors.
- Former U.S. citizens found by the Attorney General to have renounced citizenship for the purpose of avoiding taxation (the currently-unenforced Reed Amendment).

== Possible Waivers and Eligibility Requirements ==
=== Unlawful Presence ===
- If the applicant is inadmissible because they have been unlawfully present in the United States for more than 180 days but less than a year (resulting in a 3-year bar), or for one year or more (resulting in a 10-year bar), they may apply for a Waiver of Ground of Inadmissibility on Form I-601.
- An applicant may not be eligible to apply for this waiver of inadmissibility if they were unlawfully present in the United States for more than one year, left the United States, then returned without being admitted or paroled (EWI).
- The applicant must establish that their U.S. citizen or legal permanent resident spouse, parent, or the K visa petitioner would suffer extreme hardship if the application were denied.
- There are special instructions for TPS and VAWA self-petitioners applying for a waiver of this ground of inadmissibility.

=== Criminal Grounds ===
- The applicant may apply for a Waiver of Ground of Inadmissibility on Form I-601 if they have been found to be inadmissible for: (1) a crime involving moral turpitude (other than a purely political offense); (2) a controlled substance violation according to the laws and regulations of any country. (3) two or more summary convictions (other than DUI's Dangerous Driving or General Assault), or one or more Indictable convictions. (4) prostitution; (5) unlawful commercialized vice whether or not related to prostitution; or (6) being an alien involved in serious criminal activity, who has asserted immunity from prosecution.
- The applicant must establish that they are inadmissible only because of participation in prostitution (including having procured others for prostitution or having received the proceeds of prostitution), but that they have been rehabilitated and their admission will not be contrary to the national welfare, safety or security of the United States; OR
- At least 15 years have passed since the activity or event that made the applicant inadmissible, they have been rehabilitated and that their admission to the United States (or issuance of the immigrant visa) will not be contrary to the national welfare, safety or security of the United States; OR
- The applicant's qualifying U.S. citizen or legal permanent resident spouse, son, daughter, parent or K visa petitioner would experience extreme hardship if the applicant were denied admission; OR
- The applicant is an approved VAWA self-petitioner.
- The Attorney General will not favorably exercise discretion for a waiver to consent to the reapplication to the US (or adjustment of status) in cases involving violent or dangerous crimes except in extraordinary circumstances or cases where the applicant clearly demonstrates that denial of the application would result in "exceptional and extremely unusual hardship."

=== Immigration Fraud or Misrepresentation ===
- If the applicant is inadmissible because they have sought to procure an immigration benefit by fraud or misrepresenting a material fact[INA Section 212(a)(6)(C)(i)], they may apply for a Waiver of Ground of Inadmissibility on Form I-601.
- The applicant must demonstrate that their qualifying U.S. citizen or legal permanent resident spouse, parent or the K visa petitioner would experience extreme hardship if the applicant were denied admission OR the applicant is a VAWA self-petitioner and the applicant, their U.S. citizen or legal permanent resident parent or child would experience extreme hardship if the applicant were denied admission to the U.S.

=== Health Related Grounds of Inadmissibility ===
- An applicant's petition may be approved if they are the spouse, parent, unmarried son or daughter, or the minor unmarried lawfully adopted child of a U.S. citizen or legal permanent resident, or of an alien who has been issued an immigrant visa, or the fiance(e) of a U.S. citizen or the fiance(e)'s child; OR if they are a VAWA self-petitioner.
- Please note that there are additional application requirements for individuals who are inadmissible due to diagnosis with Class A Tuberculosis, HIV, or a "Physical or Mental Disorder and Associated Harmful Behavior".
- A blanket waiver of required vaccinations can be given by the civil surgeon for vaccinations that are not medically appropriate at the time of examination. Applicants with religious or moral objections to all vaccinations may submit proof and apply for a waiver.

=== Immigrant Membership in a Totalitarian Party ===
- If the applicant is inadmissible because they were a member of, or affiliated with, the Communist or any other totalitarian party, they may apply for a Waiver of Ground of Inadmissibility on Form I-601.
- A waiver may be granted for humanitarian purposes, to assure family unity, or when it is in the public interest if the applicant is the parent, spouse, son, daughter, brother or sister of a U.S. citizen, OR a spouse, son or daughter of a lawful permanent resident, OR the fiance(e) of a U.S. citizen. The applicant must also not be deemed a threat to the security of the United States.

=== Alien Smuggling ===
- If the applicant is inadmissible because they have engaged in alien smuggling, they may apply for a Waiver of Ground of Inadmissibility on Form I-601 ONLY IF they have encouraged, induced, assisted, abetted or aided an individual who at the time of the action was their spouse, parent, son or daughter (and no other individual) to enter the United States in violation of the law.
- Also, the applicant must be either: (1) a legal permanent resident who temporarily proceeded abroad, not under an order of removal, and who is otherwise admissible to the U.S. as a returning resident; or (2) seeking admission or adjustment of status as an immediate relative, a first, second or third preference immigrant, or as the fiance(e) (or his or her children) of a U.S. citizen.
- A waiver under this section may be granted for humanitarian reasons, to assure family unity, or when it is otherwise in the public interest.

== Procedures ==
Applicants may download Form I-601, Application for Waiver of Ground of Inadmissibility, from the USCIS website . Depending on whether an applicant is applying for an Immigrant Visa or Adjustment of Status, Form I-601 may be filed at the consular office, U.S. Citizenship and Immigration Services office, or immigration court considering the immigrant visa or adjustment of status application. Issues surrounding waivers of grounds of inadmissibility may be complex (including eligibility issues), and it is generally advisable to consult an attorney. The filing fee for Form I-601 is currently $930.
