= Gen Z regelt =

Youth-led protest movement

Gen Z regelt is a youth-led protest movement that emerged in Germany in October 2026. It campaigns on a range of social, economic, and political issues, including increased public investment in education, measures to address the rising cost of living and social inequality, climate protection, the protection of fundamental rights, and opposition to compulsory military service. The movement also calls for greater consideration of younger generations in political decision-making.

The protests were organized via a TikTok post and took place in Germany on 31 October and 20 November 2026. While most demonstrations remained peaceful, clashes and incidents involving property damage were reported in several cities, including Frankfurt, Hamburg and Cologne. The movement subsequently called for further demonstrations on 20 November. Other youth organizations and student groups also organized events on the same day, although they had different organizational structures and priorities.

== Background ==
Gen Z regelt emerged amid a wider wave of youth-led protests across Europe. The initiative was inspired by youth protests in France, Belgium and Spain. In Germany, smaller demonstrations and school walkouts against government policies had also taken place in the weeks leading up to the nationwide protests, particularly in Berlin.

The protests were organised via a TikTok post and took place on 31 October and 20 November 2026 in Germany. According to one of its organisers, around 30 young people from different parts of the country connected through social media to form an organising team. Many of those involved in promoting the initiative had previously participated in social movements and climate activism. The organisers later set up a website to coordinate demonstrations across the country. Social researcher Kilian Hampel noted that many young people felt powerless amid a succession of crises. He also observed that they often felt their concerns were not being heard and that they had been left to deal with their problems on their own.

== Demands and aims ==
The protests have called for greater investment in education, health care and social services, as well as measures to address inflation and social inequality. They have also called for stronger action on climate change and opposed the expansion of government surveillance and compulsory military service.

Opposition to compulsory military service has been a prominent issue at the demonstrations. Some protesters have argued that increased defence spending should not come at the expense of investment in education, health care and other public services. Others have cited poorly maintained school facilities, social inequality and inflation as reasons for joining the protests.

Other youth and student organisations involved in the protests did not necessarily share all of Gen Z regelt's demands. Some have organised separate demonstrations focusing specifically on education policy or opposition to compulsory military service. Differences in organisational structures and political priorities have also limited coordination between some of these groups.

== Development and expansion ==
On 31 October 2026, demonstrations organised under the Gen Z regelt banner took place in 34 cities across Germany, including Berlin, Frankfurt, Cologne and Munich. Around 179,000 people had registered to attend. However, registration figures did not necessarily reflect actual turnout. In Berlin, police estimated that approximately 5,000 people had attended, while organisers put the figure at around 10,000. Nationwide, the organisers reported that more than 100,000 people had taken part, whereas Reuters described the turnout as tens of thousands, below the number initially expected by the organisers.

The demonstrations attracted a range of participants, including school pupils, university students and other supporters. However, not all youth and student organisations took part in the Gen Z regelt initiative. The Federal Student Conference (BSK), a national representative body for school students, distanced itself from the initiative, citing concerns about its organisational structure. On 20 November, the BSK organised a separate demonstration in Berlin, with the participation of teachers and other youth organisations. The separate events reflected differences in each group's priorities and organisational approaches.

== Demonstrations and incidents ==
Violent incidents were reported in several cities. In Frankfurt, shops were vandalised and looted, and objects and Molotov cocktails were reportedly thrown at emergency services. In Hamburg, groups erected and set fire to barricades. In Cologne, police reported the use of pyrotechnics and violations of rules prohibiting face coverings.

In Frankfurt, 54 people aged between 13 and 29 were arrested, and more than 100 police officers were reported injured. However, the city's police operations commander said that the vast majority of participants had demonstrated peacefully and distinguished the main protest from the disturbances that followed. In Hamburg, the situation escalated particularly after police declared the demonstration over. A subsequent police assessment put the number of people provisionally detained at nearly 130, including 43 minors, who were later handed over to their parents. Twelve police officers were also reported injured. In Berlin, 56 people were temporarily detained during a separate demonstration in the Mitte district, which was distinct from the main Gen Z regelt gathering at the Brandenburg Gate. Anadolu Agency reported more than 200 arrests across several cities in connection with the unrest and demonstrations.

Police conduct, particularly in Cologne, also drew criticism. According to an account by the newspaper taz, summarised by The Local, police used a water cannon and a riot-control vehicle to push demonstrators closer together. Officers then advanced towards people who had moved onto the pavement, carrying batons. The report noted that young people and parents with children were among those in the crowd. The accounts of how the demonstration ended differed: the organiser said she had called it off after police warned her that she could be held legally responsible for any violence, while a police spokesperson said she had ended it on her own initiative. The reporting raised questions about the proportionality of the police response.

Further confrontations took place during a Gen Z regelt demonstration in Berlin-Charlottenburg on 14 November 2026. Approximately 1,200 people attended, and around 700 police officers were deployed. Twenty people were provisionally arrested, and 28 criminal complaints were filed. Three police officers were reported injured. Police said that some participants had attempted to break through a police cordon and that officers had faced resistance and attacks. Tagesschau reported that officers responded with physical force, including pushing, punches and kicks. Anadolu Agency also reported that video footage showed riot police pushing and beating a group of demonstrators inside a subway carriage. The police spokesperson did not provide information about injuries among demonstrators. Pro-Palestinian activists also joined the march, during which slogans directed against Israel, Chancellor Friedrich Merz and the police were reported.

== Reactions ==
Following the demonstrations on 31 October 2026, the organisers of Gen Z regelt distanced themselves from the violence reported in several cities. They said that they had no control over events that took place after the demonstrations had ended and rejected any association between the disturbances and the initiative's peaceful protests.

The Federal Student Conference (BSK), a national representative body for school students, decided not to mobilise support for the demonstrations. It cited concerns about Gen Z regelt's decentralised organisational structure, uncertainty about the groups involved and the lack of clearly defined central demands. Erik Sczygiol, the BSK's deputy secretary-general, said that these factors had contributed to the decision. Protest researcher Nina Kolleck suggested that concerns about possible violence, together with the BSK's decision not to mobilise support, may have discouraged some people from attending. She also noted that some parents had accompanied their children to the demonstrations.

The unrest also prompted debate among politicians about how those involved should be described. Chancellor Friedrich Merz supported comments by Interior Minister Alexander Dobrindt, who attributed the violence to members of violent left-wing groups and people from migrant backgrounds. Dobrindt described the disturbances as an attempt to take over otherwise peaceful demonstrations. Defence Minister Boris Pistorius questioned the use of the term "migrant groups", asking whether it also included German citizens whose families had lived in the country for generations. Natalie Pawlik, the federal government's integration commissioner, also criticised generalisations about people from migrant backgrounds. She warned that such statements could cast suspicion on peaceful demonstrators and on police officers and emergency workers with migrant backgrounds.

Other politicians argued that the concerns raised by young people should not be overshadowed by the violence. Education Minister Karin Prien described the demonstrators' concerns as "legitimate and extremely relevant" and called for greater dialogue with younger people. Ines Schwerdtner, co-chair of The Left, similarly argued that concerns about the cost of living and cuts to social services should not be dismissed because of violence committed by smaller groups. Franziska Brantner, leader of the Green Party, also called on the federal government to address the demonstrators' demands. In contrast, Hesse's Interior Minister Roman Poseck questioned whether further demonstrations organised by Gen Z regelt should be allowed to proceed, arguing that the organisers had failed to keep the gatherings under control. The organisers rejected this criticism and reiterated that they had distanced themselves from the violence.

== Further demonstrations ==
On 20 November 2026, Gen Z regelt organised protests in 73 cities across Germany. More than 20,000 people had registered to attend. The initiative directly organised demonstrations in Berlin, Frankfurt, Munich and Cologne, while events in other cities were organised by local groups and organisations. Other youth and student groups, including Fridays for Future, the Federal Student Conference (BSK) and the School Strike Against Conscription campaign, also called for demonstrations on the same day. Although the groups shared some concerns, they differed in their priorities and did not always coordinate their activities. Issues raised at the demonstrations included education, the cost of living, climate protection and opposition to conscription. In Berlin, Gen Z regelt organised a demonstration starting at Alexanderplatz and proceeding to Mariannenplatz. The School Strike Against Conscription campaign also encouraged people to join the march. Separately, the BSK organised a demonstration at the Brandenburg Gate, scheduled to begin at 14:30. Around 5,000 people had registered with the police to attend. The demonstration was supported by Fridays for Future, the Federal Parents' Council, the Education and Science Workers' Union (GEW) and other educational organisations. Unlike Gen Z regelt, which addressed a broader range of issues, the BSK focused on education policy. Its demands included the renovation of school buildings, expanded school social work, improved working conditions for teachers and the inclusion of climate protection in school curricula.

== See also ==
- 2026 European unrest
- 2026 French civil unrest
