= L-1 Visa Reform Act of 2004 =

The L-1 Visa Reform Act of 2004, referred to more briefly as the L-1 Reform Act, was a part of Title IV of the Consolidated Appropriations Act, 2005 (sometimes also called the Omnibus Appropriations Act of 2005) in the United States that focused on changes to regulations governing L-1 visas. The Consolidated Appropriations Act was signed by George W. Bush, then President of the United States, in early December 2004. Title IV of the Consolidated Appropriations Act also included the H-1B Visa Reform Act of 2004, that focused on H-1B visas.

== Provisions ==
The L-1 Visa Reform Act of 2004 had two main provisions and a slight change to the fee structure.

=== Ineligibility for L-1B for workers who will be stationed at another worksite ===
According to the new rules of the act, a player is now explicitly ineligible for classification as a specialized knowledge worker nonimmigrant (L-1B) visa if the worker will be "stationed primarily" at the worksite of an employer other than the petitioner or an affiliate, subsidiary, or parent and either of the following occurs:

- The alien will be "principally" under the "control and supervision" of the unaffiliated employer,
- The placement at the non-affiliated worksite is "essentially an arrangementto provide labor for hire for the unaffiliated employer," rather than a placement in connection with the provision of a product or service for which specialized knowledge specific to the petitioning employer is necessary.

This new ground of ineligibility would begin applying for petitions starting June 6, 2005, and includes petitions for initial, amended, or extended L-1B classification.

=== Reinstatement of a hard 12-month requirement for L-1 intracompany transferees ===
The Act amended section 214(c)(2)(A) of the Act to restore prior law requiring that the L-1 beneficiary of a blanket petition have been employed abroad by the L entity for a period of 12 months. In doing so, the L-1 Reform Act eliminates the 6-month exception that had been the law for blanket beneficiaries since 2001.

=== New fraud detection fee ===
Like the H-1B Visa Reform Act of 2004 that accompanied it, the L-1 Visa Reform Act of 2004 instituted a $500 anti-fraud fee over and above existing fees.

== Reception ==
The Act and its implications for applicants was discussed by Cyrus Mehta in an article for Immigration Daily in August 2005.

A report by Morrison Foerster reviewed the L-1 Visa Reform Act of 2004 and its implications for U.S. companies. It came up with three risk factors:

- Reduction or elimination of cost savings
- Risk of business disruption once the Act kicked in
- Reputational risk
- Potential legal liability and involvement in enforcement proceedings
- Potential labor law liability

The review suggested the following action items:

- Companies that make use of L-1 visa arrangements to augment project staffing should require their offshore vendors to demonstrate what steps the vendors are taking to ensure compliance with the Act.
- Affected U.S. companies may want to consider the economic, strategic, and risk implications of continuing to use L-1 outsourcing in light of the issues of control and "specialized knowledge" discussed in the review.
- Companies that continue to use L-1 outsourcing should include in their service agreements with providers appropriate representations, covenants and indemnities with respect to compliance with the Act. They should also consider how complying with the Act would affect the vendor's cost-effectiveness and ability to continue to meet performance metrics.
- To the extent a company continues to use providers that use offshore L-1 visa staff, it should maintain records to document compliance with the Act.
