= Tenrec v. USCIS =

2016 class action lawsuit against United States Citizenship and Immigration Services

Tenrec v. USCIS, colloquially known as the H-1B Lottery Lawsuit, was a class action lawsuit brought against United States Citizenship and Immigration Services, challenging the lottery process used to decide which cap-subject H-1B Form I-129 petitions to adjudicate in case more petitions were received than the cap for the fiscal year. The plaintiffs were two pairs of H-1B petitioner (employer) and beneficiary (prospective employee). The case was decided against the plaintiffs, and an appeal was withdrawn after both plaintiffs withdrew.

== Background ==
=== Legislative caps ===
The H-1B visa was introduced in its present form by the Immigration Act of 1990, with an annual cap of 65,000 for temporary skilled workers. The quotas apply for each fiscal year that begins in October of the previous calendar year. Form I-129 petitions can be filed at most six months in advance of the start date, so the start date for filing petitions for a given fiscal year is April of the preceding calendar year. The most recent legislation changing the caps was the H-1B Visa Reform Act of 2004 (passed December 6, 2004), which added 20,000 cap-exempt slots for workers with United States master's degrees.

=== Lottery process ===
The USCIS published a regulation in the Federal Register on May 5, 2005, describing its process for deciding which of the H-1B Form I-129 petitions it received in a given fiscal year it would adjudicate, while staying within the legislatively determined cap of 65,000 + 20,000. The regulation stated that all petitions "before" the date of crossing the cap would be adjudicated, whereas petitions received on the day of hitting the cap would be subjected to a lottery to select just the right number that would hit the cap. USCIS would not accept further petitions in that fiscal year. Moreover, petitions where the beneficiary had a U.S. Master's degree would be counted against the 20,000 limit first, and if that limit was hit before the 65,000 general limit, further such petitions would be counted against the 65,000 limit. Petitions that were submitted later, or that were submitted on the last date and did not win the lottery for the last date, would get no preferential treatment in later years.

During the 2008 fiscal year, the USCIS received enough cap-subject petitions to hit its cap within the first two working days of April, and had to put all petitions through a lottery to select which ones to adjudicate. To reduce pressure on overnight courier services and USCIS service centers, USCIS changed its selection process effective fiscal year 2009: it would now receive cap-subject petitions for at least the five working days of April, and, if it received enough petitions in that period, it would stop receiving applications and select petitions to adjudicate by putting all received petitions through a lottery. Unselected petitions in a given year continued to not receive preferential treatment in subsequent years.

=== Related FOIA lawsuit ===
On May 20, 2016 (two weeks before Tenrec v. USCIS), the American Immigration Lawyers Association, with help from the American Immigration Council, filed a Freedom of Information Act (FOIA) lawsuit against USCIS, seeking more transparency into the H-1B lottery process. USCIS responded on August 1, 2016, with three affirmative defenses.

== Case ==
=== Original lawsuit ===
On June 2, 2016, a lawsuit was filed in the United States District Court for the District of Oregon against the United States Citizenship and Immigration Services (USCIS), challenging the H-1B lottery process. The plaintiffs were two pairs of petitioner (prospective employer) and beneficiary (prospective employee), where the beneficiary had not been selected in the H-1B lottery process:

- Tenrec, Inc. for beneficiary Sergii Sinienok (from Ukraine)
- Walker Mary LLC, for beneficiary Xiaoyang Zhu (from China)

The plaintiffs were represented by the law firm Parrilli Renison, with attorney Brent Renison the point of contact.

On June 29, the complaint was amended to add claim for failure under the Administrative Procedure Act. On July 7, a class certification was filed, seeking to represent all employers and employees hurt by the H-1B lottery. A motion for summary judgment was also filed, asking the court to rule in favor of the plaintiffs and have an orderly lottery.

=== Motion to dismiss ===
On August 8, 2016, USCIS filed a motion to dismiss the lawsuit. On September 22, 2016, Michael Simon, a judge at the United States District Court for the District of Oregon, denied the USCIS motion to dismiss the lawsuit.

=== Decision ===
Between October 2016 and March 2017, there were several iterations of amended complaints, motions to dismiss, and answers. During this time, one of the original plaintiffs, Tenrec, Inc. and employee Sergii Sinienok, withdrew from the lawsuit, so that Walker Mary LLC and Xiaoyang Zhu were now the lead plaintiffs.

On March 17, 2017, judge Michael Simon made the Oregon District Court's final decision against the plaintiffs, so that the fiscal year 2018 lottery (that would be held in April 2017) could proceed as planned. The plaintiffs timely appealed to the United States Court of Appeals for the Ninth Circuit on April 4, but on June 23, the case was dismissed after the plaintiffs withdrew as the lead plaintiffs won the lottery in fiscal year 2018 and no other willing lead plaintiff was found.

== Reception ==
Writing for National Law Review, Cassie Ramos noted that while the lawsuit highlighted problems with the H-1B lottery, the proposed solution of using a waiting list suffered from its own problems, without a way for the employees in the waitlist to continue to stay and work in the country. Instead, the author proposed that the cap gap for Optional Practical Training be made flexible so that it could be extended by a year for anybody who did not get through the H-1B lottery. The article highlighted the importance of increasing caps in addressing the underlying issue.
