= Exceptional circumstances =

Circumstances allowing entities such as government agencies additional powers

Exceptional circumstances are the conditions required to grant additional powers to a government agency or government leader so as to alleviate, or mitigate, unforeseen or unconventional hardship. The term is commonly used in Australia, where it has been applied in various contexts, most recognizably in relation to special consideration policies for students and drought relief payments for farmers known as Exceptional Circumstances Relief Payments or ECRP.

== Australia ==
=== Exceptional Circumstances Relief Payments ===
The Exceptional Circumstances Relief Payments or ECRP program was established in 1992 and has continued in various forms since. It provides financial assistance to farmers considered to be experiencing exceptional circumstances. Eligibility is generally determined by geographic location; specific areas are considered to be experiencing worse-than-normal drought conditions and, as such, farmers in those areas qualify for assistance. Farm-dependent small businesses may also be eligible for assistance.

In February 2009, the Australian Government Department of Agriculture, Fisheries and Forestry announced that the payments would continue for an additional 12 months in 52 areas throughout Australia.

=== Exceptional Circumstances Interest Subsidy ===
The Australian Government has also established a program to provide low-interest loans via private financial institutions which receive a subsidy from the Government. The program is known as the Exceptional Circumstances Interest Subsidy support scheme.

Qualification is based on terms (geographical location) set by the Exceptional Circumstances Relief Payments program.

=== Other Australian Government Departments ===
The term has been used in a range of other governmental contexts in Australia including, but not limited to:

- The Department of Health and Ageing accreditation of aged care facilities.
- The Department of Immigration and Citizenship - visas, immigration and refugees.

== Uses elsewhere ==
- The term has been used by various other governments in relation to unconventional circumstances where a head of state is required to make use of reserve powers.
- The term is used in the ACM/IEEE Software Engineering Code of Ethics and Professional Practice.

== Non-government ==
The term has also been used to refer to other extraordinary circumstances which might result in a person acting in a manner not ordinarily accepted as common practice, such as the circumstances described by Dr. Muhammad Hedayetullah in relation to the Islamic prayer, salat.

== See also ==
- Exceptional and extremely unusual hardship
- Extreme hardship
