= Roman Poseck =

German politician (born 1970)

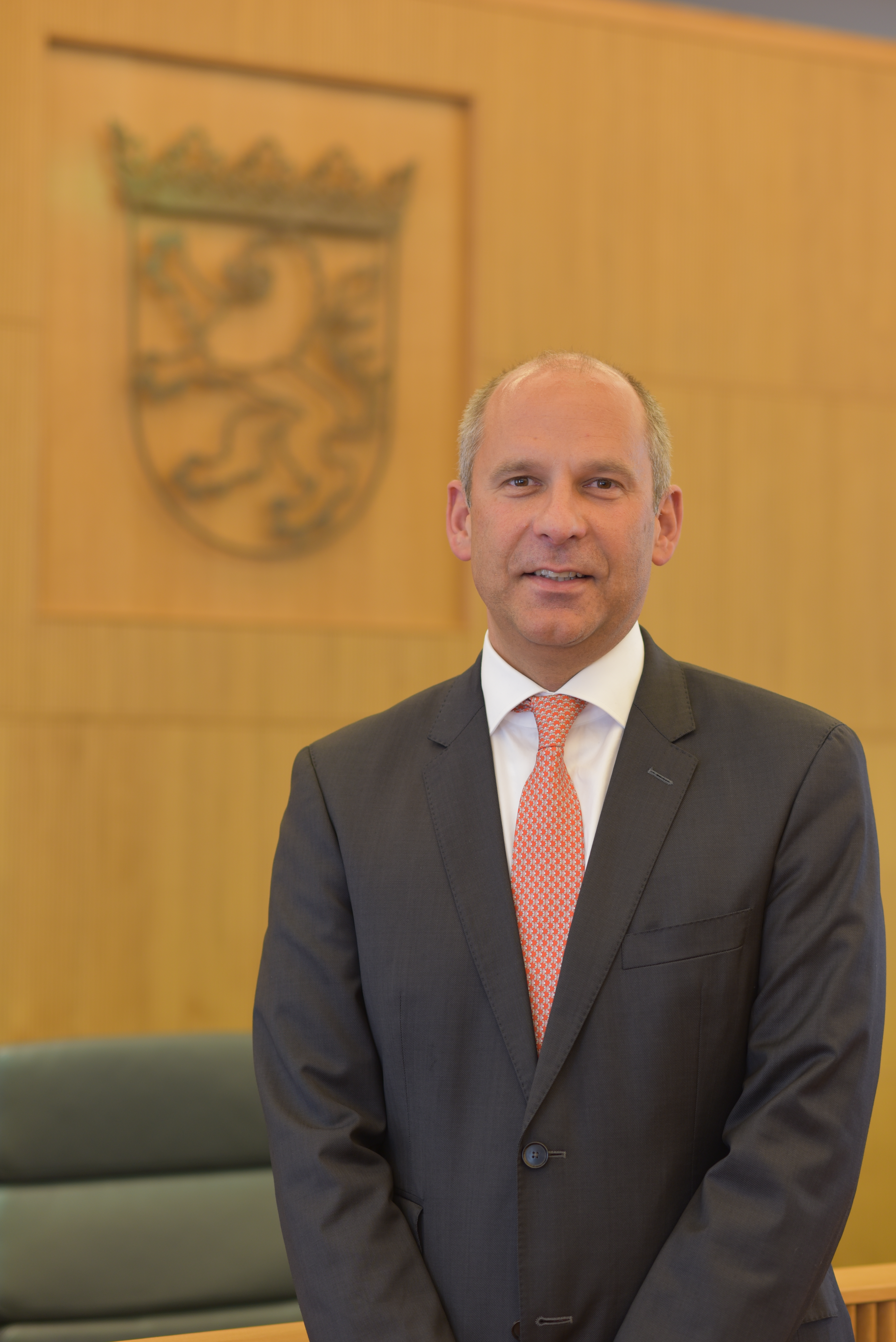
- Poseck in 2017

Minister of the Interior of Hesse
- Incumbent
- Assumed office 18 January 2024
- Minister-President: Boris Rhein
- Preceded by: Peter Beuth

Personal details
- Born: 16 March 1970 (age 56) Mülheim an der Ruhr
- Party: Christian Democratic Union (since 2006)

Roman Poseck (born 16 March 1970 in Mülheim an der Ruhr) is a German politician serving as minister of the interior of Hesse since 2024. From 2022 to 2024, he served as minister of justice of Hesse.

== Live ==
Roman Poseck studied law and holds an Ph.D.. He worked as a law consultant for BASF 1999/2000. From 2000 to 2012 he served as a judge in Limburg and Frankfurt, and held various positions within the Hessian Ministry of Justice. From 2012 to 2022 he was president of Oberlandesgerichts Frankfurt am Main and from 2017 on president of Hessian State Court.

In 2022 he became Minister of Justposeckce in Hesse and in 2024 Minister of the Interior, Security and Homeland Security of Hesse.

== Political stances ==
On key social and security-policy issues, Poseck advocates for value-conservative and "law and order" positions.

=== Deportations ===
He advocates for a shift in German asylum policy. Poseck expressed support for deportations carried out without a prior asylum procedure in cases where states might use migration as a deliberate tool of pressure. However, he provided no evidence that any states are actually using migration as such a tool.

=== Hybrid-warefare ===
Poseck believes that Germany and the state of Hesse are facing an external threat of a magnitude unprecedented in history. He explicitly warned against Russia and the leadership under Vladimir Putin, stating that they are waging a hybrid war—involving sabotage, espionage, and targeted disinformation against the West, with the aim of destabilizing both the country and the European Union.

=== Attacking The Left ===
Following the 2026 Berlin election, Roman Poseck stated: "In my view, the 'clan problem' within the Berlin Left has reached a new dimension." This remark is part of a statement that the Interior Ministry released in writing via its Instagram channel on September 27, 2026. Poseck had failed to comply with a prior cease-and-desist demand.

=== Connecting migration debatte to Gen Z protests ===
During the Gen Z protests 2026 in Germany, 10,000 young people demonstrated peacefully for social justice, an affordable cost of living, the abolition of compulsory military service, and a high-quality education system. On the fringes of the demonstrations, unrest broke out in some large cities, and in Frankfurt, fashion stores were looted.

Poseck stated in the media (including on Tagesthemen) that the rioters were “predominantly of migrant background.” He referred to them as “migrant troublemakers” and called for a debate free from “misguided taboos.”

Frankfurt is one of the major cities where many German citizens have a migrant background, with some families having lived in Germany for three generations. From a demographic perspective, it is clear that many of the youths engaging in acts of vandalism have a "migrant background." Critics have pointed out that this is more closely linked to social circumstances than to ethnic or ancestral background, and that the remarks made by Poseck carry racist connotationspos.

Within the SPD parliamentary group in Hesse, there was head-shaking over the motives of the CDU Interior Minister Poseck. No individual SPD politician voiced criticism openly, however, out of respect for coalition discipline.
