= Peter Beuth (Hesse politician) =

German politician (born 1967)

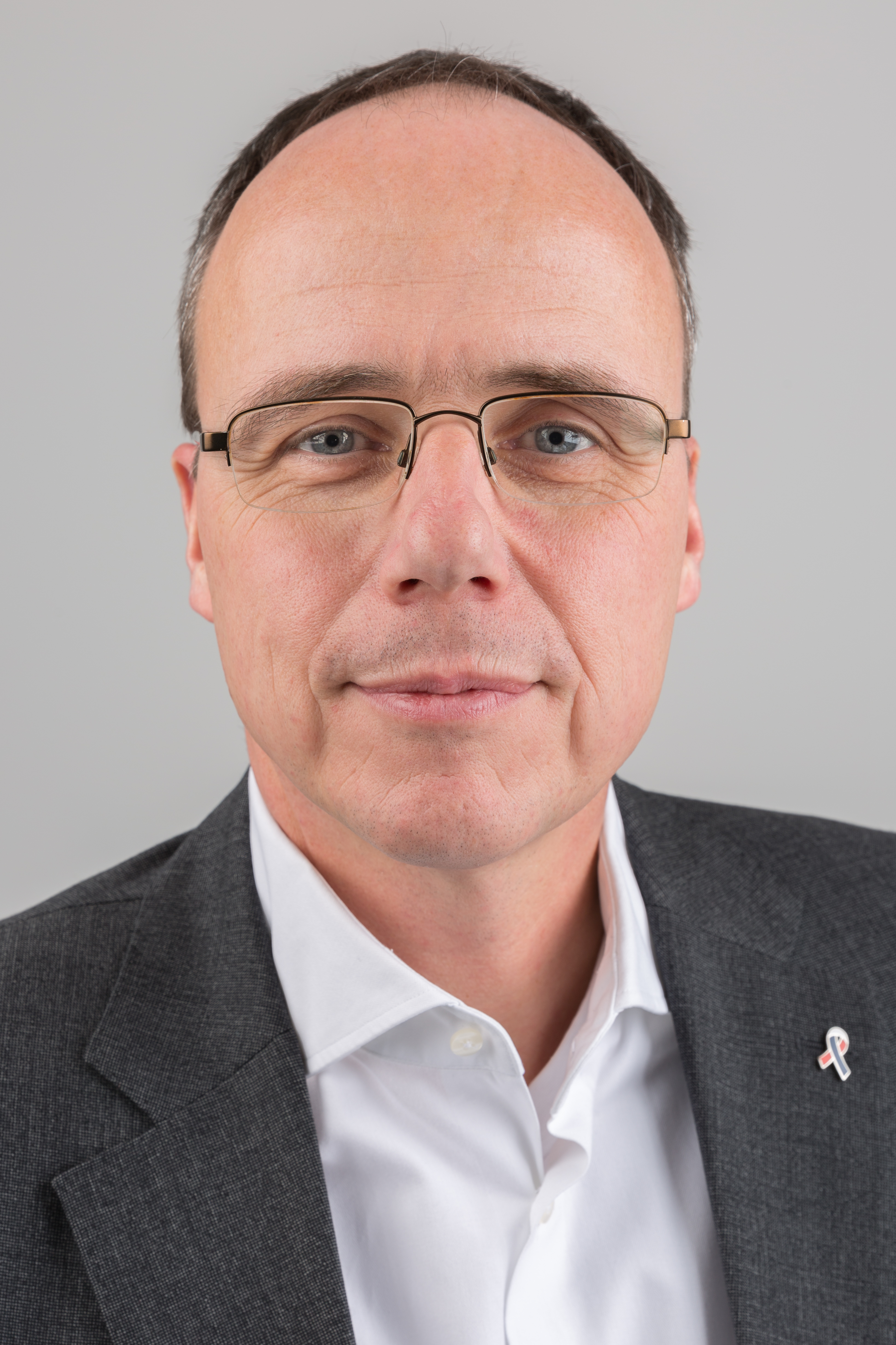
Peter Beuth (2016)

Peter Beuth (born 3 December 1967 in Cologne) is a German politician. He is a member of the CDU party. Beuth is an MP in the Landtag, the parliament of Hesse. Since 18 January 2014 he is State Minister of the Interior and for Sports in the government of Minister-President Volker Bouffier of Hesse. Before that he was Secretary General of CDU Hesse since 14 March 2009.

== Early life and career ==
After high school diploma in 1988 in Taunusstein Beuth worked as an assistant for media planning. He studied law at University of Mainz completing his studies in 1997 with the first state examination, in 2001 with the second state examination. Since October 2003 to 2014 he worked as a lawyer.

== Political career ==
Beuth joined the Junge Union (JU) in Oberhausen in 1983, in 1987 he was elected chairman of JU Hohenstein, 1989 county chairman of JU Rheingau-Taunus-Kreis. 1994-1998 he was member of the JU board in the state of Hesse. In 1987 Beuth also joined the CDU in Hohenstein and was vice county chairman since the year of 2000. From 1993 to 2011 he was member of the county council (Kreistag) of Rheingau-Taunus-Kreis, since 2011 he is county councillor on a voluntary base. From 1997 to 2009 and 2011-2012 he was city councillor of the city of Taunusstein, 2004-2008 faction leader of CDU Taunusstein. In 2000 he also was elected county vice chairman of CDU Rheingau-Taunus. 2006-2014 he was in the Regionalversammlung Südhessen ("Regional Assembly Hesse South").

In the 1999 state elections, Beuth was elected MP of the Landtag of Hesse, working in several committees, such as Law Committee and Cultural Committee. Beuth also worked as a speaker for law policies and interior policies of the CDU faction in the Landtag. In March 2009 Beuth was elected Secretary General of the CDU Hesse under the leadership of party chairman Roland Koch. He was re-elected in 2012.

Beuth led Volker Bouffier's electoral campaign in Hesse in 2013 state elections which resulted in the CDU becoming the strongest political force in the state. He also led the coalition talks with the Green Party resulting in the first CDU-Green party coalition in a territorial state in Germany.

In the negotiations to form a coalition government under the leadership of Chancellor Angela Merkel following the 2017 federal elections, Beuth was part of the working group on internal and legal affairs, led by Thomas de Maizière, Stephan Mayer and Heiko Maas.

== Other activities ==
=== Corporate boards ===
- Messe Frankfurt, Member of the Supervisory Board

=== Non-profit organizations ===
- Sports Medicine Institute Frankfurt (SMI), Member of the Board of Trustees
- Hessische Feuerwehrstiftung, Chairman

== Political positions ==
Beuth was criticized by the opposition parties in the Landtag of Hesse in 2016 in the aftermath of the New Year's Eve sexual assaults in Germany as the tabloid Bild reported on confidential documents of the State Office of Criminal Investigation ("Landeskriminalamt", LKA) which showed that the police had not reported on relevant offenses of refugees.

Beuth is unusually strict in rejecting asylum applications, vetoing around 20% of applications approved by the Hardship Commission, while previous interior ministers Volker Bouffier und Boris Rhein vetoed around 1% and Joachim Herrmann in neighbouring Bavaria vetoed 2%.
