= Exceptional and extremely unusual hardship =

United States legal term

Exceptional and extremely unusual hardship is a legal term in the United States, primarily in the Immigration and Nationality Act (INA).

== United States Immigration and Nationality Act ==
The term "exceptional and extremely unusual hardship" is mentioned in a number of statutes of the Immigration and Nationality Act (INA), which was enacted by the U.S. Congress in 1952 and amended a number of times over the past sixty years. The terms "exceptional and extremely unusual hardship" and "extreme hardship" are not synonymous but obviously different from each other.

Under the INA, effects of certain grounds to deportability can be waived by immigration officers under the U.S. Secretary of Homeland Security or by immigration judges under the U.S. Attorney General. Their decisions can be appealed to the Board of Immigration Appeals (BIA) and then reviewed by authorized federal judges.

== See also ==
- Exceptional circumstances
- Extreme hardship
