= U visa =

Type of US nonimmigrant visa

The U visa is a United States nonimmigrant visa which is set aside for victims of crimes (and their immediate family members) who have suffered substantial mental or physical abuse while in the U.S. and who are willing to assist law enforcement and government officials in the investigation or prosecution of the criminal activity. It permits such victims to enter or remain in the US when they might not otherwise be able to do so. An advantage that comes along with the acceptance of a U visa is the individual will have deportation protection which is important when they are collaborating with law enforcement.

The US Congress created the U nonimmigrant visa with the passage of the Victims of Trafficking and Violence Protection Act (including the Battered Immigrant Women’s Protection Act) in October 2000. The legislation was intended to strengthen the ability of law enforcement agencies to investigate and prosecute cases of domestic violence, sexual assault, trafficking of people, and other crimes while, at the same time, offer protection to victims of such crimes. The legislation also helps law enforcement agencies to better serve victims of crimes.

== Eligibility ==
=== Requirements ===
There are six legal requirements for U nonimmigrant status:

- The applicant must have been a victim of a qualifying criminal activity.
- The applicant must have suffered substantial physical or mental abuse as a result of having been a victim of these criminal activities.
- The applicant must have information concerning that criminal activity.
- The applicant must have been helpful, is being helpful, or is likely to be helpful in the investigation or prosecution of the crime.
- The criminal activity occurred in the United States or violated U.S. laws.
- The applicant is admissible to the United States under current U.S. immigration laws and regulations; those who are not admissible may apply for a waiver.

=== Qualifying criminal activity ===
Crimes whose victims may qualify for U nonimmigrant status include:

- Abduction
- Abusive sexual contact
- Blackmail
- Domestic violence
- Extortion
- False imprisonment
- Female genital mutilation
- Felonious assault
- Fraud in foreign labor contracting
- Hostage
- Incest
- Involuntary servitude
- Manslaughter
- Murder
- Obstruction of justice
- Peonage
- Perjury
- Prostitution
- Rape
- Sexual assault
- Sexual exploitation
- Slave trade
- Stalking
- Torture
- Trafficking
- Witness tampering
- Unlawful criminal restraint
- Other related crimes, including attempt, conspiracy, or solicitation of any of these offenses, or similar activity where the elements of the crime are substantially similar.

=== Certification of helpfulness ===
A petition for U nonimmigrant status must also contain a certification of helpfulness in the form of a U Nonimmigrant Status Certification (Form I-918, Supplement B) from a certifying law enforcement agency. This document demonstrates the petitioner "has been helpful, is being helpful, or is likely to be helpful" in the investigation or prosecution of the criminal activity.

The government entities which are considered "certifying agencies" for the purpose of a U visa application include federal, state or local law enforcement agencies, prosecutors, and judges, as well as child protective services, the Equal Employment Opportunity Commission, and the Department of Labor.

=== U visa-based adjustment of status: obtaining a green card/lawful permanent residence ===
After three years of continuous physical presence in the United States while in U nonimmigrant status, a U visa holder may be eligible to adjust status and become a lawful permanent resident if certain requirements are met.

An applicant for U visa-based adjustment of status must still be in valid U status at the time he or she files the Form I-485, which is the date on which U.S. Citizenship and Immigration Services (USCIS) receives the properly-completed application.

With the completed and signed Form I-485, Application to Register Permanent Residence or Adjust Status, applicants must submit:

- Evidence to show the applicant's approval as a U nonimmigrant;
- A complete Form I-693, Report of Medical Examination and Vaccination Record, signed and filled out by a designated civil surgeon;
- The applicant's birth certificate and a complete certified English translation of the birth certificate if it is not in English;
- Copies of all pages of all passports (and/or other travel documents) the applicant has had that have been valid at any time while he or she has been in U status, or an explanation regarding why the passport(s) are unavailable or lacking;
- A self-affidavit by the applicant himself or herself attesting to three years of continuous physical presence in the United States since being admitted as a U nonimmigrant and listing the dates of any departures from and arrivals to the United States while in U status;
- Evidence to show at least three years of continuous physical presence since being admitted as a U nonimmigrant;
- Evidence that the applicant has not unreasonably refused to provide assistance in a criminal investigation or prosecution;
- Evidence to show that discretionary adjustment of status is merited based on humanitarian grounds/family unity/public interest; and
- Evidence of relationship to the U-1 principal (if applying to adjust status as the derivative family member of a U-1).

== Types of U visas ==
The specific types of U visas are:

- U-1 visas - for persons who were crime victims and fit the other criteria
- U-2 visas - spouses of U-1 applicants
- U-3 visas - children of U-1 applicants
- U-4 visas - parents of U-1 applicants who are unmarried and under 21
- U-5 visas - minor siblings of U-1 applicants who are unmarried and under 21

== Issues ==
=== Backlog of cases ===
As of January 2016, there is a backlog of 64,000 requested U visas, but only 10,000 U-1 visas can be issued per year. (There is no limit on the number of "derivative" U visas—U visas other than U-1.) Some police departments do not certify any applicants as cooperating, either for political reasons or due to confusion over the law, though in some jurisdictions like California and New York City, there are laws or policies which require prompt certification of anyone eligible.

=== Visa fraud ===
Abuse of the U visa often occurs when immigrant applicants stage crimes in order to obtain eligibility. Fake crime victims may pay thousands of dollars to obtain U-visa eligibility, while business venues involved in the scheme are also paid to host the fake crimes. A notable case from 2023 involved an organized multi-state operation to falsify robberies of immigrants for U visas, while another case from 2024 saw a fake robber being killed by an armed bystander.

A 2022 Department of Homeland Security Office of Inspector General report concluded that the U-visa program was mismanaged and susceptible to fraud, with fraudulent petitioners gaining U-visa benefits while legitimate victims had to wait for years. The report surveyed 57 law enforcement agencies across the United States and concluded that the U-visa program is not helpful for solving crimes, with 61% of respondents stating that the U-visa program did not significantly improve their ability to investigate and solve crimes. 54% of respondents also believed that U-visa petitioners abuse the program.

=== California-specific benefits ===
Once approved for the visa the individual may receive state benefits such as Cal Fresh. The CAPI program is fully funded by the state and aims to offer regular monetary assistance to non-citizen individuals who are aged, blind, or disabled and cannot receive SSI/SSP benefits because of their immigration status. Individuals with a pending application qualify for work authorization under a USCIS statute; once approved for the visa the individual will receive longer term work authorization. Once approved the recipient may refer their immediate family members (spouse, unmarried children under the age of 21, or siblings under the age of 21) by filing a I-918A, and they will be almost certainly approved.

== Statistics ==
=== Number of visas issued by year ===
Although the U status was created in October 2000, the first visas based on this status were issued in Fiscal Year 2009. The table below includes data from fiscal years, so for instance the year 2009 refers to the period from October 1, 2008 to September 30, 2009. Note that this only counts U visas issued at embassies and consulates outside the United States, and does not include people who changed non-immigrant status to U status within the United States (through Form I-918).

| Period | Petitions by Case Status | | | | | | | | | | | |
| Period | Victims of Criminal Activities | | | | Family Members | | | | Fiscal Year Total | | | |
| Period | Petitions Received | Approved | Denied | Pending | Petitions Received | Approved | Denied | Pending | Petitions Received | Approved | Denied | Pending |
| Fiscal Year - Total | | | | | | | | | | | | |
| 2009 | 6,850 | 6,045 | 661 | 11,740 | 4,102 | 2,838 | 158 | 9,275 | 10,952 | 8,883 | 819 | 21,015 |
| 2010 | 9,657 | 10,015 | 3,995 | 7,480 | 6,418 | 9,315 | 2,576 | 6,242 | 16,075 | 19,330 | 6,571 | 13,722 |
| 2011 | 14,647 | 10,025 | 2,007 | 10,250 | 10,033 | 7,602 | 1,645 | 8,329 | 24,680 | 17,627 | 3,652 | 18,579 |
| 2012 | 21,141 | 10,031 | 1,684 | 19,824 | 15,126 | 7,421 | 1,465 | 15,592 | 36,267 | 17,452 | 3,149 | 35,416 |
| 2013 | 25,486 | 10,022 | 1,840 | 33,409 | 18,266 | 7,724 | 1,234 | 24,480 | 43,752 | 17,746 | 3,074 | 57,889 |
| 2014 | 26,089 | 10,077 | 3,662 | 45,814 | 19,297 | 8,457 | 2,655 | 32,948 | 45,386 | 18,534 | 6,317 | 78,762 |
| 2015 | 30,129 | 10,060 | 2,440 | 63,779 | 22,636 | 7,649 | 1,754 | 46,507 | 52,765 | 17,709 | 4,194 | 110,286 |
| 2016 | 34,797 | 10,019 | 1,761 | 87,290 | 25,469 | 7,624 | 1,257 | 63,616 | 60,266 | 17,643 | 3,018 | 150,906 |
| 2017 | 37,287 | 10,011 | 2,042 | 112,272 | 25,703 | 7,628 | 1,612 | 79,971 | 62,990 | 17,639 | 3,654 | 192,243 |
| 2018 | 34,967 | 10,009 | 2,317 | 134,714 | 24,024 | 7,906 | 1,991 | 94,050 | 58,991 | 17,915 | 4,308 | 228,764 |
| 2019 | 28,364 | 10,010 | 2,733 | 151,758 | 18,861 | 7,846 | 2,397 | 103,737 | 47,225 | 17,856 | 5,130 | 255,495 |
| 2020 | 22,358 | 10,013 | 2,693 | 161,708 | 14,090 | 7,212 | 2,472 | 108,366 | 36,448 | 17,225 | 5,165 | 270,074 |
| 2021 | 21,874 | 10,003 | 3,594 | 170,805 | 15,290 | 6,728 | 3,085 | 114,450 | 37,164 | 16,731 | 6,679 | 285,255 |
| 2022 | 30,120 | 10,003 | 2,992 | 189,381 | 20,954 | 7,423 | 2,803 | 126,158 | 51,074 | 17,426 | 5,795 | 315,539 |
