= Extreme hardship =

Legal term in United States immigration law

In US immigration law, extreme hardship is a term with a specific legal meaning.

Deportability and inadmissibility can be waived in specific circumstances, under the discretion of the USCIS adjudicator or immigration court. Several grounds for waivers have been defined. Some involve "extreme hardship" affecting a qualifying family member (close relatives of a US citizen or legal permanent resident).

Hardship affecting the to the defendant (deportee) is not relevant, only hardship caused to the qualifying family caused by removing the defendant or excluding him from admission. These waivers are governed by INA 212 and INA 237. The United States Waiver of Inadmissibility application is required for INA 212 waivers, while INA 237 waivers do not have an such application.

Quote from the Board of Immigration Appeals rejecting the appeal of a waiver:

"U.S. court decisions have repeatedly held that the common results of deportation or exclusion are insufficient to prove extreme hardship. See Hassan v. INS, 927 F.2d 465, 468 (9th Cir. 1991). For example, Matter of Pilch, 21 I&N Dec. 627 (BIA 1996), held that emotional hardship caused by severing family and community ties is a common result of deportation and does not constitute extreme hardship. In addition, Perez v. INS, 96 F.3d 390 (9th Cir. 1996), held that the common results of deportation are insufficient to prove extreme hardship and defined extreme hardship as hardship that was unusual or beyond that which would normally be expected upon deportation. Hassan v. INS, supra, held further that the uprooting of family and separation from friends does not necessarily amount to extreme hardship but rather represents the type of inconvenience and hardship experienced by the families of most aliens being deported. The AAO recognizes that the applicant's spouse and/or children would likely endure hardship as a result of separation from the applicant. However, their situation, if they remain in the United States, is typical to individuals separated as a result of deportation or exclusion and does not rise to the level of extreme hardship."

== Qualifying family member ==
The two levels of qualifying family members, depending on the grounds for a waiver are:

INS 212(i) or 237:

- US citizen or LPR parents
- US citizen or LPR spouse

INS 212(h) waivers:

- US citizen or LPR children
