= Jaskółka =

Jaskółka may refer to:

- Jaskółka-class minesweeper, of the Polish Navy
- ORP Jaskółka, the lead ship of the Polish Navy class
- SZD-8 Jaskółka, a Polish glider
- SZD-14x Jaskółka M, a Polish glider
- SZD-17X Jaskółka L, a Polish glider
- Jaskółka (surname)

== See also ==
- Jaskólski
