= Working holiday visa =

Form of residence permit

A working holiday visa is a residence permit that allows travellers to undertake employment (and sometimes study) in a country that issues the visa to supplement their travel funds. A working holiday visa allows holders to live in a foreign country without securing work sponsorship in advance or joining a university exchange programme. Most working holiday visas are offered under reciprocal agreements between certain countries to encourage travel and cultural exchange between their citizens.

In some countries, there is growing criticism of working holiday visas because governments are increasingly linking them to labour strategies rather than centring on cultural exchange. This is often achieved by tweaking mobility infrastructure, such as visa rules, to direct working holiday-makers toward specific regions and jobs. Scholars have claimed that these kinds of visa programmes make immigrants more vulnerable to exploitation and sexual harassment.

There are often several restrictions on this type of visa:

- Many are intended for young travellers and, as such, have an age restriction (usually from 18 to 30 or 35 years of age).
- There are usually limits on the type of employment taken or the time the traveller can be employed.
- The visa holder is expected to have sufficient funds to live on while seeking employment.
- The visa holder should have some health or travel insurance for the duration of the stay (unless the country will cover it).

== States offering working holiday visas ==
=== Asia ===
==== Hong Kong ====
The Hong Kong Special Administrative Region government has working holiday visa agreements with Australia, Austria, Canada, France, Germany, Hungary, Ireland, Italy, Japan, the Netherlands, New Zealand, South Korea, Sweden, and the United Kingdom.

Travellers must agree to hold medical, comprehensive hospitalisation, and liability insurance. Separately, Hong Kong residents aged 18 to 30 who are British National (Overseas) citizens can apply for the UK Youth Mobility Scheme without sponsors.

==== India ====
As part of a new agreement with India, the UK government has agreed (albeit in a non-binding agreement) to participate in a scheme to increase mobility for a limited number of young people between India and the UK. It has some similarities to the existing Youth Mobility Scheme and will allow up to 3,000 Indian nationals per year, aged between 18 and 30 years of age, to come to the UK to live and work for up to 2 years. In return, 3,000 UK nationals a year will be able to do the same in India.

==== Indonesia ====
Citizens of Australia aged 18–30 years with functional Indonesian language skills and at least two years of university education can apply for a 12-month Work and Holiday visa in the Republic of Indonesia.

==== Israel ====
Citizens of Australia, Austria, the Czech Republic, Germany, Japan, New Zealand, South Korea and Taiwan between the ages of 18 and 30 can apply for a 1-year Israeli working holiday visa in the State of Israel.

==== Japan ====
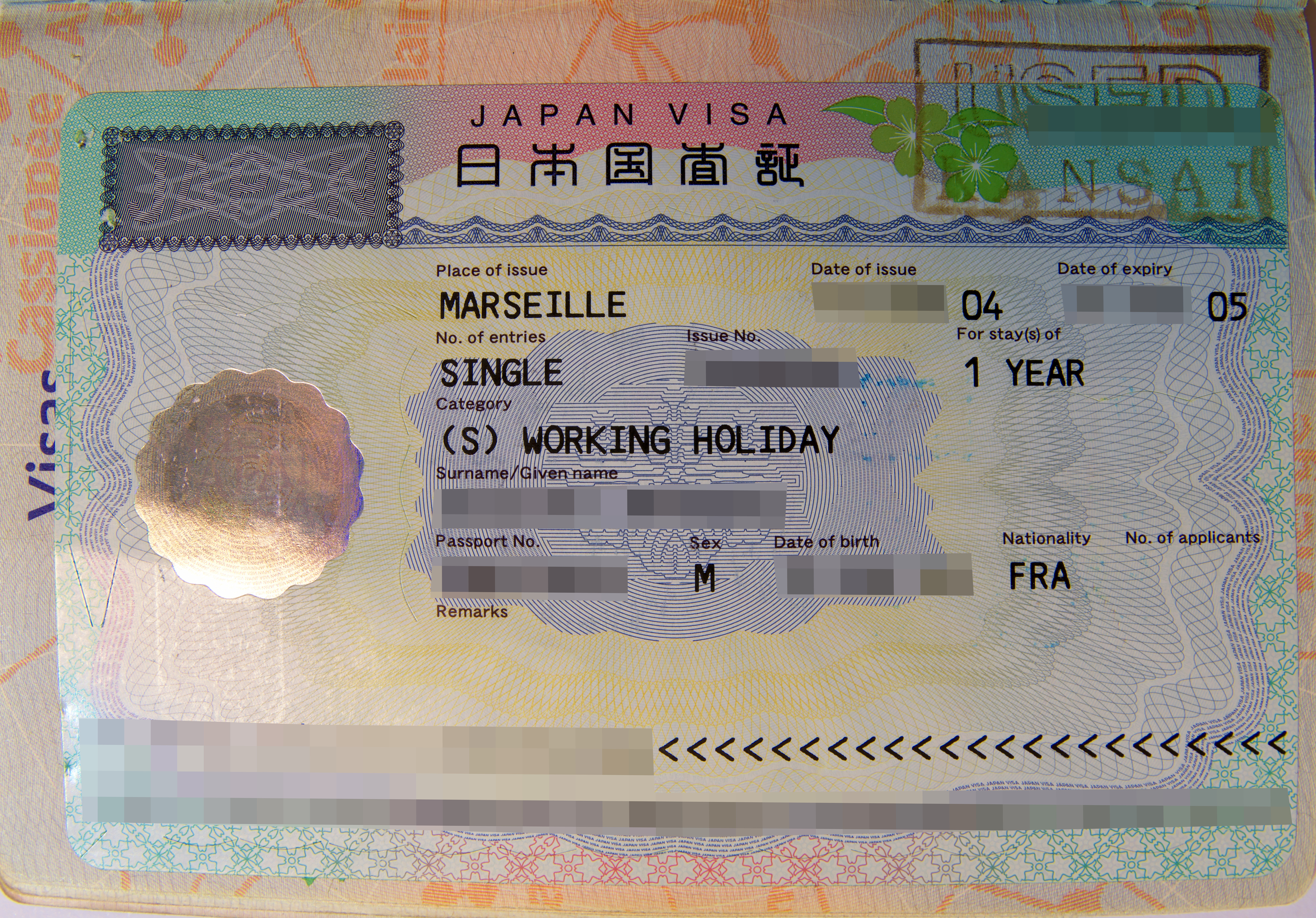
Japanese working holiday visa issued on a French passport in 2004.

Japan initiated working holiday programmes with Australia, New Zealand, Canada, South Korea, France, Germany, the United Kingdom, Ireland, Denmark, Taiwan, Hong Kong, Norway, Portugal, Poland, Slovakia, Austria, Hungary, Spain, Argentina, Chile, Iceland, the Czech Republic, Lithuania, Sweden, Estonia, the Netherlands, Uruguay, Finland, Latvia, Italy, Israel, Malta, Luxembourg and Peru.

Japan's Working Holiday Programmes are designed to foster young people's global perspectives and enhance friendly relations between Japan and partner countries/regions by providing opportunities for them to deepen their understanding of those countries/regions.

Japan's Working Holiday participants are allowed to work for a certain period of their stay to cover the cost of travel and lodging in partner countries/regions.

Citizens of the following 15 countries who are between the ages of 18 and 30 are eligible for the Working Holiday Programmes in Japan: Australia, Canada, Denmark, France, Germany, Hong Kong, Ireland, New Zealand, Norway, Poland, Portugal, Slovakia, South Korea, Taiwan, and the United Kingdom.

A one-year visa may be granted to citizens of Denmark, France, Germany, Ireland, South Korea, Norway, Poland, Portugal, Slovakia, and the United Kingdom—with no extension possible. A six-month visa may be granted to citizens of Australia, which can be extended twice, and once for citizens of New Zealand and Canada.

==== Malaysia ====
Citizens of New Zealand aged 18–30 can apply for a 1-year Malaysian working holiday visa in the Federation of Malaysia.

Citizens of Australia aged 18–30 can apply for a 1-year Malaysian working holiday visa under the work and holiday visa programme for the Federation of Malaysia.

University students in Malaysia aged 18 to 28 can apply for Winter and Summer Work Travel (under the J-1 visa) to the US.

==== Philippines ====
Citizens of New Zealand aged 18–30 can apply for a 1-year Philippine working holiday visa in the Republic of the Philippines.

==== Singapore ====
Undergraduate university students or recent graduates from universities in Australia, France, Germany, Hong Kong, Japan, the Netherlands, New Zealand, South Korea, Switzerland, the United Kingdom or the United States aged between 18 and 25 can apply for a 6-month Work Holiday Pass under Singapore's Work Holiday Programme. Uniquely, there are no stated restrictions on nationality, only that the applicant be a student or graduate from a university in the listed countries.

Citizens of Australia aged between 18 and 30 who have studied at a university for at least 2 years may also apply for a 12-month visa under the Work and Holiday Visa Programme.

The universities must be recognised by their home government.

==== South Korea ====
The Korea Working Holiday Program is available to qualifying citizens of Andorra, Argentina, Australia, Austria, Belgium, Canada, Chile, the Czech Republic, Denmark, France, Germany, Hong Kong, Hungary, Ireland, Israel, Italy, Japan, Latvia, Luxembourg, the Netherlands, New Zealand, Poland, Portugal, Spain, Sweden, Taiwan, the UK, and the USA.

==== Taiwan ====
Since the programme was launched, Taiwan has signed working holiday agreements with 18 countries, i.e., Australia, Austria, Belgium, Canada, the Czech Republic, France, Germany, Hungary, Ireland, Israel, Japan, Korea, Luxembourg, the Netherlands, New Zealand, Poland, Slovakia, and the United Kingdom. As agreements may differ regarding the quota of participants, age restrictions, and the maximum duration of stay, foreign youth are advised to check the terms of the agreement that pertains to their home country and abide by Taiwan's laws and regulations.

==== Thailand ====
Citizens of Australia and New Zealand are eligible for a 1-year Thai working holiday visa in the Kingdom of Thailand.

Applicants must be aged between 18 and 30 and have tertiary qualifications (full-time courses of at least 3 years).

Applicants must have an Australian passport valid for at least 6 months or a New Zealand passport valid for at least 12 months, a return ticket or sufficient funds to purchase one, and funds of at least A$5,000 or NZ$7,000, and must be in good health and hold comprehensive medical insurance.

Applications must be made at the Thai Embassy in Canberra or the Thai Consulate in Sydney for Australian nationals, or at the Thai Embassy in Wellington for New Zealand nationals.

==== Turkey ====
The Turkish working holiday visa allows a stay of up to 12 months and is available to Australian and New Zealand citizens.

The Ministry of Foreign Affairs of Turkey's Working Holiday Program provides opportunities for young people aged between 18 and 30 years (inclusive) to holiday in the Republic of Turkey and to supplement their travel funds through incidental employment.

==== Vietnam ====
The Vietnamese working holiday visa allows a stay of up to 1 year and is available to citizens of Australia and New Zealand in the Socialist Republic of Vietnam.

=== Europe ===
==== Andorra ====
Citizens of Canada, Germany, Iceland, Ireland, Norway, South Korea, and the United Kingdom aged 18 to 30 may apply for a 1-year Andorran working holiday visa in the Principality of Andorra.

==== Austria ====
- Citizens of Argentina, Australia, Canada, Chile, Hong Kong, India, Israel, Japan, New Zealand, South Korea, Taiwan, and the United States aged 18–30 can apply for a 6-month and one-year Austrian working holiday visa (which also permits study) in the Republic of Austria.
- As Austria is a Schengen Agreement signatory, the one-year Austrian working holiday visa serves as a Type D national visa, which permits the holder to stay and work in the Republic of Austria during the visa's period of validity, as well as travelling in the rest of the Schengen Area for up to 90 days in a 180-day period (i.e., a maximum of 180 days in the 25 other Schengen countries during the visa's 1-year validity).

==== Belgium ====
- Citizens of Australia, Canada, South Korea, New Zealand and Taiwan aged 18–30 may be eligible for a 1-year Belgian working holiday visa in the Belgium Federal Public.
- As Belgium is a Schengen Agreement signatory, the 2-year Belgian working holiday visa serves as a Type D national visa, which permits the holder to stay and work in the Kingdom of Belgium during the visa's period of validity, as well as travelling in the rest of the Schengen Area for up to 90 days in a 180-day period (i.e., a maximum of 180 days in the 25 other Schengen countries during the visa's 1-year validity).

==== Czech Republic ====
- Citizens of Australia, Canada, Chile, Israel, Japan, New Zealand, Peru, South Korea, and Taiwan aged 18–30 or 35 (18-26 for Australians) can apply for a 1-year Czech working holiday visa in the Czech Republic.
- As the Czech Republic is a Schengen Agreement signatory, the 2-year Czech working holiday visa serves as a Type D national visa, which permits the holder to stay and work in Česká republika during the visa's period of validity, as well as travelling in the rest of the Schengen Area for up to 90 days in a 180-day period (i.e., a maximum of 180 days in the 25 other Schengen countries during the visa's 1-year validity).

==== Denmark ====
- Citizens of Argentina, Australia, Canada, Chile, Japan, New Zealand, and South Korea can apply for a 1-year Danish working holiday visa in the Kingdom of Denmark.
- As Denmark is a Schengen Agreement signatory, the one-year Danish working holiday visa serves as a Type D national visa, which permits the holder to stay and work in Kongeriget Danmark during the visa's period of validity, as well as travelling in the rest of the Schengen Area for up to 90 days in a 180-day period (i.e., a maximum of 180 days in the 25 other Schengen countries during the visa's one-year validity).

==== Estonia ====
- Under the Memorandum of Understanding between the Government of Estonia and Australia, Canada, Japan, and New Zealand visas are being issued, granting the right to work to 18–30 years old Australian, Canadian, New Zealander, who may stay in the Republic of Estonia for up to 1 year.
- From 2020, a Youth Mobility Program for young Estonians & Koreans took effect in Estonia and South Korea.

==== Finland ====
- Citizens of Australia, Canada (18-35), Japan, and New Zealand aged 18–30 can apply for a 1-year Finnish working holiday visa in Finland.
- As Finland is a Schengen Agreement signatory, the 1-year Finnish working holiday visa serves as a Type D national visa, which permits the holder to stay and work in the Republic of Finland during the visa's period of validity, as well as travel in the rest of the Schengen Area for up to 90 days in a 180-day period (i.e., a maximum of 180 days in the 25 other Schengen countries during the visa's 1-year validity).

==== France ====
- Citizens of Argentina, Australia, Brazil, Canada, Chile, Colombia, Ecuador, Hong Kong, Japan, Mexico, New Zealand, Peru, Russia, South Korea, Taiwan, and Uruguay, aged 18–30 (or 18-35 for Australia, Canada and Argentina passport holders) can apply for a 1-year French working holiday visa (Permis Vacances Travail, usually called PVT).
- As France is a Schengen Agreement signatory, the 1-year French working holiday residence permit allows the holder to stay and work in République française during the visa's period of validity, as well as travel in the rest of the Schengen Area for up to 90 days in a 180-day period (i.e., a maximum of 180 days in the 25 other Schengen countries during the visa's 1-year validity).
- Note that citizens of Albania, Andorra, Antigua and Barbuda, Argentina, Bahamas, Barbados, Bosnia and Herzegovina, Brunei, Canada, Chile, Costa Rica, Croatia, El Salvador, Guatemala, Honduras, Israel, Macedonia, Malaysia, Mauritius, Monaco, Montenegro, New Zealand, Nicaragua, Panama, Paraguay, Saint Kitts and Nevis, Saint Vincent and the Grenadines, San Marino, Seychelles, Taiwan, Uruguay and the Vatican City, as well as British Nationals (Overseas), of any age who wish to work in France for up to 90 days can do so without a visa or work permit. Other foreign nationals who are ordinarily visa-exempt may be able to work in France without a visa if they hold a valid work permit before entry.

==== Georgia ====
- The state programme to work and travel are now available in Georgia.
- Citizens of Peru aged 18 to 30 can apply for a 12-month Georgian working holiday visa in Georgia.

==== Germany ====
- Citizens of Andorra, Argentina, Australia, Brazil, Chile, Hong Kong, Israel, Japan, Mexico, New Zealand, Taiwan, and Uruguay aged between 18 and 30 and of the Republic of Korea (South Korea) aged between 18 and 34 may apply for a 1-year German working holiday visa.
- Citizens of Canada between 18 and 35 years of age may apply as well. There is no limit on the duration of employment, during the stay of up to 12 months. Evidence of sufficient funds for the first three months is required (i.e., 250 euros per month).
- Among other nationalities, the European Union, the European Economic Area, Australians, Canadians, Israeli, Japanese, South Koreans, New Zealanders, Swiss, and Americans can apply for a residence permit to remain in Bundesrepublik Deutschland if they find long-term work that they are uniquely qualified to do. This is subject to approval by the government employment office, Bundesagentur für Arbeit. (See §16 AufenthV)
- As Germany is a Schengen Agreement signatory, the 1-year German working holiday residence permit allows the holder to stay and work in the Federal Republic of Germany during the visa's period of validity, as well as travel in the rest of the Schengen Area for up to 90 days in a 180-day period (i.e., a maximum of 180 days in the 25 other Schengen countries during the visa's 1-year validity).

==== Greece ====
- Citizens of Australia and Canada aged 18 to 30 can apply for a one-year Greek working holiday visa in the Hellenic Republic.
- As Greece is a Schengen Agreement signatory, the 1-year Greek working holiday visa serves as a Type D national visa, which permits the holder to stay and work in Greece during the visa's period of validity, as well as travel in the rest of the Schengen Area for up to 90 days in a 180-day period (i.e., a maximum of 180 days in the 25 other Schengen countries during the visa's 1-year validity).

==== Hungary ====
- Citizens of Argentina, Australia, Chile, Colombia, Ecuador, Hong Kong, Japan, New Zealand, South Korea, and Taiwan between the ages 18–30 and 35 may apply for a 1-year Hungarian working holiday visa in the Republic of Hungary.
- As Hungary is a Schengen Agreement signatory, the 1-year Hungarian working holiday visa serves as a Type D national visa, which permits the holder to stay and work in the State of Hungary during the visa's period of validity, as well as travel in the rest of the Schengen Area for up to 90 days in a 180-day period (i.e., a maximum of 180 days in the 25 other Schengen countries during the visa's 1-year validity).

==== Iceland ====
- Citizens of Andorra, Canada (2-year), Chile, Japan, and the United Kingdom (2-year) aged 18 to 30 may apply for a one-year Icelandic working holiday visa in the Republic of Iceland.

==== Ireland ====
- Citizens of Andorra, Argentina, Chile, Hong Kong, Japan, New Zealand, Taiwan, the United States, and Uruguay aged 18–30 (inclusive) and of Australia aged 18–35 (inclusive), and of South Korea aged 18–34 (inclusive) may be eligible for a one-year Irish working holiday visa in the Republic of Ireland.
- Citizens of Canada between the ages of 18 and 35 are eligible for a two-year working holiday visa.

==== Italy ====
- Citizens of Australia, Canada, (18-35) Hong Kong, Japan, New Zealand and South Korea aged between 18 and 30 can apply for a 1- year Italian working holiday visa in Repubblica Italiana.
- Citizens of Canada aged between 18 and 35 can apply for a two-year Italian working holiday visa in the Italian Republic.
- As Italy is a Schengen Agreement signatory, the two-year Italian working holiday visa serves as a Type D national visa, which permits the holder to stay and work in the Italian Republic during the visa's period of validity, as well as travel in the rest of the Schengen Area for up to 90 days in a 180-day period (i.e., a maximum of 180 days in the 25 other Schengen countries during the visa's 1-year validity).

==== Latvia ====
- Citizens of Australia, Canada, Japan, New Zealand, and South Korea between the ages of 18 and 30 (18–35 for Canada) can apply for a one-year Latvian working holiday visa in the Latvian Republic.

==== Lithuania ====
- Citizens of Canada, Japan, New Zealand Ages of 18-30 or 35 inclusively on the date the application can get a one-year Lithuanian working holiday visa.
- As the Republic of Lithuania is a Schengen Agreement signatory, the one-year Lithuanian working holiday visa serves as a Type D national visa, which permits the holder to stay and work in Lithuania during the visa's period of validity, as well as travelling in the rest of the Schengen Area for up to 90 days in a 180-day period (i.e., a maximum of 180 days in the 25 other Schengen countries during the visa's 1-year validity).

==== Luxembourg ====
- The Grand Duchy of Luxembourg signed bilateral agreements with Australia, Canada, Japan, New Zealand, South Korea, and Taiwan, which allow a limited number of young citizens between 18 and 30 years of age from these countries to undertake a stay of one year in Luxembourg.
- Luxembourg signed a Working Holiday Agreement with Chile in July 2018.

==== Malta ====
Malta has working holiday agreements with Australia and New Zealand.

==== Monaco ====
- British citizens between the ages of 18 and 30 can apply for a two-year Monégasque working holiday visa in the Principality of Monaco.

==== Netherlands ====
- Citizens of Argentina, Australia, Canada, Hong Kong, Japan, New Zealand, South Korea, Taiwan, and Uruguay between the ages of 18 and 30 are eligible for a one-year Dutch working holiday visa in the Kingdom of the Netherlands.
- As the Netherlands is a Schengen Agreement signatory, the one-year Dutch working holiday visa serves as a Type D national visa, which permits the holder to stay and work in the Netherlands during the visa's period of validity, as well as travel in the rest of the Schengen Area for up to 90 days in a 180-day period (i.e., a maximum of 180 days in the 25 other Schengen countries during the visa's 1-year validity).

==== Norway ====
- Citizens of Andorra, Argentina, Australia, Japan and New Zealand who are between the ages of 18 and 30 (inclusive) are eligible for a one-time Norwegian working holiday visa in the Kingdom of Norway.
- Citizens of Canada who are between the ages of 18 and 35 are eligible for a one-year Nordic working holiday visa in the Kingdom of Norway.

==== Poland ====
- Poland and South Korea have signed the working holiday visa program. This agreement will start in April 2018 in both nations.
- Citizens of Canada aged 18 to 35 years old are eligible for the Polish working holiday scheme in the Republic of Poland.
- Citizens of Argentina, Australia, Chile, Japan, New Zealand, Peru, and Taiwan between the ages of 18 and 30 (inclusive) at the time of application can apply for the Polish working holiday visa.
- As Poland is a Schengen Agreement signatory, the two-year Polish working holiday visa serves as a Type D national visa, which permits the holder to stay and work in Rzeczpospolita Polska during the visa's period of validity as well as travel in the rest of the Schengen Area for up to 90 days in a 180-day period (i.e., a maximum of 180 days in the 25 other Schengen countries during the visa's validity).

==== Portugal ====
- Citizens of Argentina, Australia, Canada, Chile, Japan, New Zealand, Peru, South Korea, the United States, and Uruguay aged 18 to 30 (18 to 35 for Canada and Uruguay), (18 to 34 for South Korea) can apply for a two-year Portuguese working holiday visa in the Portuguese Republic.
- As Portugal is a Schengen Agreement signatory, the two-year Portuguese working holiday visa serves as a Type D national visa, which permits the holder to stay and work in República Portuguesa during the visa's period of validity, as well as travel in the rest of the Schengen Area for up to 90 days in a 180-day period (i.e., a maximum of 180 days in the 25 other Schengen countries during the visa's validity).

==== Romania ====
- The Romanian government has a working holiday programme agreement with the Republic of Korea, thus citizens of South Korea between the ages of 18 and 30 years old can apply for a one-year Romanian working holiday visa in Romania.
- As Romania is a Schengen Agreement signatory, the one-year Romanian Working Holiday Visa serves as a Type D national visa, which permits the holder to stay and work in Romania during the visa's period of validity, as well as travel in the rest of the Schengen Area for up to 90 days in a 180-day period (i.e., a maximum of 180 days in the 25 other Schengen countries during the visa's one-year validity).

==== Russia ====
- French citizens between the ages of 18 and 30 can apply for a four-month Russian working holiday visa in the Russian Federation. The number of visas is capped at 500. However, the work and holiday program is currently banned because of the Russian invasion of Ukraine.

==== San Marino ====
- The working holiday visa of the Republic of San Marino is available to citizens of Australia, Canada, and the United Kingdom for up to one year.

==== Slovakia ====
- Citizens of Australia, Canada, Japan, New Zealand, and Taiwan aged 18–30 or 35 can apply for a one-year Slovak working holiday visa in the Slovak Republic.
- As Slovakia is a Schengen Agreement signatory, the one-year Slovak working holiday visa serves as a Type D national visa, which permits the holder to stay and work in Slovenská republika during the visa's period of validity as well as travel in the rest of the Schengen Area for up to 90 days in a 180-day period (i.e., a maximum of 180 days in the 25 other Schengen countries during the visa's 1-year validity).

==== Slovenia ====
- Citizens of Argentina, Australia, (18-31) Canada, (18-35) New Zealand,
- As Slovenia is a Schengen Agreement signatory, the one-year Slovenian working holiday visa serves as a Type D national visa, which permits the holder to stay and work in Republic of Slovenia during the visa's period of validity, as well as travel in the rest of the Schengen Area for up to 90 days in a 180-day period (i.e., a maximum of 180 days in the 25 other Schengen countries during the visa's 1-year validity).

==== Spain ====
- Citizens of Australia, Japan, and New Zealand aged 18–30 can apply for a one-year Spanish working holiday visa in the Kingdom of Spain.
- Spain has signed an agreement with Canada called the "Youth Mobility Program" that allows 18 to 35 year olds to spend up to a year in Spain. The annual visa acceptance quota for this program is 1000.
- Spain and South Korea have signed an agreement on a working holiday visa program that has, since 2018, allowed one thousand young people from Korea and Spain to live, work, and travel in the other country for up to a year.
- As Spain is a Schengen Agreement signatory, the one-year Spanish working holiday visa serves as a Type D national visa, which permits the holder to stay and work in Spain during the visa's period of validity, as well as travel in the rest of the Schengen Area for up to 90 days in a 180-day period (i.e., a maximum of 180 days in the 25 other Schengen countries during the visa's 1-year validity). However, registering for a NIE number is required.

==== Sweden ====
- The Swedish government currently offers a working holiday visa program from outside the European Union countries to Argentina, Australia, Canada, Chile, Hong Kong, Japan, New Zealand, Peru, South Korea, and Uruguay passport holders for up to one year in the Kingdom of Sweden.
- As Sweden is a Schengen Agreement signatory, the 24-months Swedish working holiday visa serves as a Type D national visa, which permits the holder to stay and work in Konungariket Sverige during the visa's period of validity, as well as travel in the rest of the Schengen Area for up to 90 days in a 180-day period (i.e., a maximum of 180 days in the 25 other Schengen countries during the visa's validity).

==== United Kingdom ====
- On 27 November 2008, several youth mobility schemes were combined into Tier 5 (Youth Mobility) as part of the Points-Based Immigration System. The previous Working Holidaymaker Scheme for Commonwealth nationals was merged with other schemes: au pairs, BUNAC, the Gap Year entrants concession, the Japan Youth Exchange Scheme and the concession for research assistants to MPs. Participating countries must offer a reciprocal scheme to young British nationals. The scheme has 13 participating countries: Andorra, Australia, Canada, Hong Kong, Iceland, India, Japan, Monaco, New Zealand, San Marino, South Korea, Taiwan, Uruguay and British nationals who are not citizens of the UK including British Nationals (Overseas), British Overseas Territory Citizens and British Overseas Citizens can also apply in the United Kingdom of Great Britain and Northern Ireland.
- The 24-month validity period runs continuously from the date on which the Entry Clearance is valid, regardless of any time spent travelling outside the UK. This period cannot be extended nor can it be put on hold, except for nationals of New Zealand, Australia, and Canada who can apply to extend their visas for a third year.
- Although participants can undertake self-funded study while they are in the UK, either part-time or full-time, they cannot switch in the UK to a student immigration status. Someone who wishes to stay in the UK longer to complete a full-time course must apply for a student visa in their home country. If someone does complete a course of study in the UK during their Tier 5 leave, they will not be eligible to switch to the Tier 1 (Post Study Work) scheme within the UK.

=== North America ===
==== Canada ====
- The International Experience Canada are now known as IEC (International Experience Canada) work permits.
- Citizens of Andorra, Australia, Austria, Belgium, Chile, Costa Rica, Croatia, Czech Republic, Denmark, Estonia, Finland, France, Germany, Greece, Hong Kong SAR, Iceland, Ireland, Italy, Japan, Latvia, Lithuania, Luxembourg, Mexico, the Netherlands, New Zealand, Norway, Poland, Portugal, San Marino, Slovakia, Slovenia, South Korea, Spain, Sweden, Switzerland, Taiwan, Ukraine and the United Kingdom are eligible for a Canadian working holiday visa, so long as they fulfill certain criteria which are specific to each country.
- Citizens of the United States are eligible for 12-month working holiday permits if obtained through the intermediary organization SWAP.
- Citizens of Poland between the ages of 18 and 35 have been eligible since 2009. Canada has also signed an agreement with Spain.
- Citizens of Ukraine between the ages of 18 and 25 have been eligible since 2010. There are no restrictions on applicants' status (non-students).
- Age ranges are 18–30 for most countries; 18–35 for citizens of Australia, Chile, Croatia, the Czech Republic, Denmark, France, Germany, Italy, Ireland, New Zealand, Norway, Portugal, and Switzerland. Some countries' programmes specify that the applicant must be a full-time student; others do not, and some have separate programmes for students and non-students.
- The type of work allowed and the maximum duration of stay depend on the applicant's country of residence.
- Canada has a quota system. Candidate profiles are drawn at random from pools. This is because in many countries, many applicants are competing for a spot in a very limited period, although many have argued that a lottery-type program would be fairer.
- There are "rounds of invitations" sent out regularly, as long as there are spots available. If candidates receive an invitation to apply, they have only 10 days to accept or decline it.

==== Mexico ====
- Citizens of Canada, France, Germany, New Zealand, South Korea are eligible for a Mexican working holiday visa in Mexico valid for 1 year or some kind of 2 year. Applicants must be aged 18–30.
- Citizens of Chile, Colombia, and Peru are eligible for the Pacific Alliance working holiday visa in the United Mexican States, valid for 1 year, to Chileans, Colombians, and Peruvians aged 18–30.

=== Oceania ===
==== Australia ====
- The Working Holiday Visa requires holders to abide by two conditions: First, they cannot work for the same employer for more than 6 months. Second, they cannot engage in any study or training for more than 4 months.
- Australia's Working Holiday program provides opportunities for people aged between 18 and 30 years to holiday in Australia and to supplement their travel funds through short-term employment. On November 1, 2018, Australia announced an increase in the age limit to 35 years for Irish and Canadian citizens (on July 1, 2019 for French citizens) applying for a Working Holiday Visa to Australia.
- The visa allows a stay of up to 12 months from the date of first entry to Australia, regardless of whether the holder spends the whole time in Australia. There is an optional 12-month extension available for individuals who have completed three months of specified work in designated rural areas of Australia.
- As of July 1, 2019, Working Holiday Visa holders who undertake six months of specified work in a specified regional area during their second year may be eligible for a third-year visa.
- Any work of a temporary or casual nature is allowed, but work for more than six months with any one employer is usually not permitted. New rules allow Working Holiday Visa holders to work longer than six months with one employer.
- Working holiday visa holders are entitled to study or embark on a training course for a maximum of four months.
- Individuals may be subject to medical checks before coming to Australia, particularly if seeking employment in healthcare or teaching. The online application system will notify applicants if they are required to undergo medical checks.
- The Australian working holiday visa is only available to eligible candidates once in a lifetime, although by undertaking work in a specified industry in regional Australia, it is possible to gain eligibility for an additional 12-month working holiday visa.

Working Holiday Visa Subclass 417: Belgium, Canada, Cyprus, Denmark, Estonia, Finland, France, Germany, Hong Kong, Ireland, Italy, Japan, Malta, Netherlands, Norway, South Korea, Sweden, Taiwan, United Kingdom.

Work and Holiday Visa Subclass 462: Argentina, Austria, Brazil, Chile, China, Czech Republic, Ecuador, Greece, Hungary, India, Indonesia, Israel, Luxembourg, Malaysia, Mongolia, Papua New Guinea, Peru, Poland, Portugal, San Marino, Singapore, Slovak Republic, Slovenia, Spain, Switzerland, Thailand, Turkey, Uruguay, United States and Vietnam.

- New Zealand passport holders can work in Australia with few restrictions under the Trans-Tasman travel arrangement.

On 15 June 2021, the United Kingdom and Australia reached a Free Trade Agreement. As part of the agreement, Working Holiday Visa rights for British Citizens in Australia have been expanded with the cut-off age being increased to 35. In addition British citizens will no longer be required to perform agricultural work to be able to renew the visa, which will be able to be renewed twice for a maximum stay in Australia of three years.

==== New Zealand ====
- Available to citizens of the following 45 countries or regions:

Argentina, Austria, Belgium, Brazil, Canada, Chile, China, Croatia, Czech Republic, Denmark, Estonia, Finland, France, Germany, Hong Kong, Hungary, Ireland, Israel, Italy, Japan, Latvia, Lithuania, Luxembourg, Malaysia, Malta, Mexico, Netherlands, Norway, Peru, Philippines, Poland, Portugal, Singapore, Slovakia, Slovenia, South Korea, Spain, Sweden, Taiwan, Thailand, Turkey, United Kingdom, United States, Uruguay and Vietnam.

- No working holiday visa is required for Australian citizens. All Australian citizens, regardless of their age or education (but subject to being of good character), are granted a residence class visa at the border upon entering New Zealand by virtue of the Trans-Tasman Travel Arrangement.
- Citizens of Canada and the United Kingdom can work in New Zealand for up to 23 months on a working holiday visa; citizens of other countries can work up to 12 months.
- Citizens of most countries have to be at least 18 and not more than 30. However, Canada, Argentina, Chile, Uruguay, Finland, Czech Republic, Slovakia, and Hungary have to be at least 18 and not more than 35 years old.
- Most travellers can enroll in one training or study course of up to three months duration during their visit. Australian citizens can study in New Zealand indefinitely.

==== Papua New Guinea ====
- Citizens of Australia aged 18–30 may be eligible for a two-year Papua New Guinean working holiday visa in the Independent State of Papua New Guinea.

=== South America ===
==== Argentina ====
Argentina offers working holiday visas to citizens of Australia, Denmark, France, Germany, Ireland, the Netherlands, New Zealand, Poland, Portugal, South Korea, and Sweden. The details and quotas vary per country, from the age of 18 to 30 or 35.

==== Brazil ====
Citizens of France, Germany, and New Zealand can apply for a Brazilian working holiday visa.

==== Chile ====
- Citizens of Australia, Austria, Canada, Croatia, the Czech Republic, Denmark, France, Germany, Hungary, Iceland, Ireland, Japan, Luxembourg, New Zealand, Poland, Portugal, South Korea, and Sweden aged 18–30 or 35 (in the case of Canada and Hungary) can apply for a one-year Chilean working holiday visa. Also, if they can provide evidence of holding a medical and comprehensive hospitalization insurance to remain in force throughout their stay in the Republic of Chile.
- Also, citizens of Colombia, Mexico, and Peru can apply for the Pacific Alliance (Chile, Colombia, Mexico, Peru) work and holiday visa in the República de Chile.
- Chilean citizens up to 35 years old can apply for a "Young Professionals" visa in Switzerland, where they can stay up to 18 months working in a job related to their degree or vocational training. A job offer is required to apply for this visa.

==== Colombia ====
- Citizens of Chile, Mexico, or Peru can apply to the Pacific Alliance work and holiday visa valid for up to one year in República de Colombia.
- Citizens of France and Hungary aged 18–30 can apply for a one-year Colombian working holiday visa in Colombia.

==== Ecuador ====
- Citizens of Hungary can apply for an Ecuadorian working holiday visa.

==== Paraguay ====
As of 2020, Australia and Paraguay were negotiating a working holiday visa program.

==== Peru ====
Australia, the Czech Republic, France, and Poland have signed working holiday visa agreements with Peru.

As of 2017, Portugal and Peru were negotiating a working holiday visa program. As of 2019, Sweden and Peru were discussing a potential working holiday visa program. As of 2020, Georgia and Peru were negotiating a working holiday visa program. As of 2023, Japan and Peru were negotiating a working holiday visa program.

==== Uruguay ====
- The Uruguayan working holiday visa programmes allows a stay of up to 12 months and is available to Australia, France, Germany, Ireland, Japan, the Netherlands, New Zealand, Portugal, Sweden and the United Kingdom citizens in the Oriental Republic of Uruguay.
- Uruguay's Working Holiday Program provides opportunities for people aged between 18 and 30 years (inclusive) to holiday in Uruguay and to supplement their travel funds through incidental employment.

== See also ==
- Gap year
- Designated Area Migration Agreement (DAMA) Australia
