= Jaskulski =

Jaskólski, feminine: Jaskólska is a Polish-language toponymic surname derived from any of the places named Jaskółki. The latter word is the plural of the Polish word jaskółka, i.e., literally means "swallows". The surname may be phonemically transcribed as Jaskulski / Jaskulska. The latter surname may also be derived from the nickname Jaskuła, which is either a derisive reference to "bricklayer", "mason", or an augmentative from jaskółka, either a bird or a plant. As a Polish noble surname, it belongs to the Leszczyc coat of arms heraldic clan.

When transliterated via the Russian language, the surname accepts the forms Yaskolsky / Yaskolski (f.: Yaskolskaya), resp. Yaskulsky / Yaskulski (f.: Yaskulskaya).

Notable people with the surname include:

- Jan Jaskólski, Polish triple jumper
- Erwin Jaskulski (1902–2006), American sprinter
- Franciszek Jerzy Jaskulski (1913–1947), Polish resistance fighter
- Marta Jaskulska (born 2000), Polish cyclist
- Patryk Jaskulski (born 1990), Polish politician
- Robert Jaskulski (1926–2002), American politician
- Waldemar Jaskulski, Polish footballer

== See also ==
- Jaskółka (disambiguation)
