= Patryk Jaskulski =

Polish politician (born 1990)

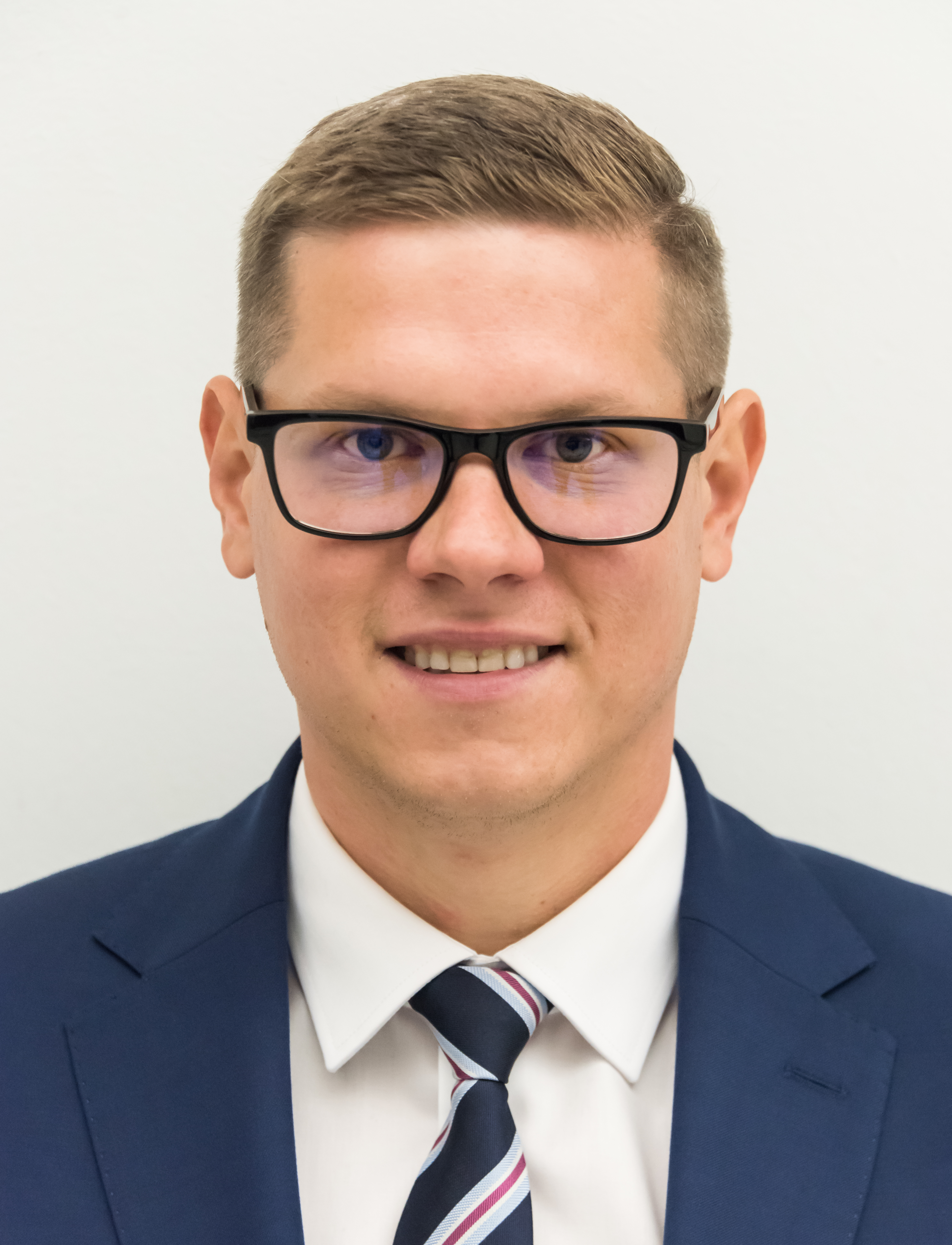
- Jaskulski in 2023

Member of the Sejm
- Incumbent
- Assumed office 13 November 2023
- Constituency: Szczecin

Personal details
- Born: 18 August 1990 (age 36)
- Party: Civic Platform

Patryk Jaskulski (born August 18, 1990 in Szczecin) is a Polish politician serving as a member of the Sejm since 2023. From 2018 to 2023, he was a city councilor of Szczecin.

== Early life, education, and early career ==
Jaskulski graduated with a Master's degree in Political Science from the University of Szczecin (2014) and a Master's degree in Management from the Faculty of Economics in Szczecin at the Poznań School of Banking (2017). Jaskulski participated in the Summer Work and Travel student exchange program in the United States in 2016.
