= Carolina Gelen =

American cookbook author

Carolina Gelen is a Romanian-born American recipe developer and cookbook author. Her debut cookbook won a 2025 James Beard Award.

== Early life and education ==
Gelen was born and raised in Transylvania, Romania to an Ashkenazi Jewish family. Her family lived in Romania and had lived the Revolution; her family lived and owned a one-bedroom apartment. She has said the family was poor and that thrifting was "a huge part of my life". Her family is of Romanian-Jewish and Hungarian-Jewish descent. She learned to cook from her mother, an innovative home cook, learning to develop her own recipes. She has said she improved her English by watching cooking shows such as MasterChef.

Gelen studied computer science in college in Romania and found work in the field, but did not enjoy it.

== Career ==
Gelen began posting recipes to social media while still living in Romania.

In 2018, when she was in her early 20s, Gelen travelled to the United States on a J-1 visa to work in restaurants in ski resorts in Park City. She returned to the US to work multiple years. She continued posting recipes, developed a following, and was approached by New York Times Cooking, Food52, and other cooking websites. Because her following was primarily based in the United States, she eventually began the immigration process, immigrating in 2021 By 2022 her combined social media audience was more than 2 million.

Gelen specializes in developing recipes based in traditional Eastern European, Middle Eastern, and Jewish cuisines for home cooks in the US. Many of the recipes she creates are based on complex recipes that require multiple steps, sometimes over multiple days, which she simplifies to make more appealing and accessible to American home cooks.

In 2024 Gelen's first cookbook, Pass the Plate: 100 Delicious, Highly Shareable, Everyday Recipes, was published by Clarkson Potter. Eater named it one of their best fall cookbooks of 2024. The book won a 2025 James Beard Award.

== Personal life ==
As of 2025 she lives in Heber City, Utah. She is Jewish.
