= Jaskula =

Jaskóła or Jaskuła is a Polish surname. It is derived from the nickname Jaskuła, which is either a derisive reference to "bricklayer", "mason", or an augmentative from jaskółka, either a bird or a plant. It has archaic feminine forms (still used colloquially): Jaskulina (by husband), Jaskulanka (by father).

Notable people with the surname include:

- Tomasz Jaskóła (born 1974), Polish politician;
- Henryk Jaskuła (1923–2020), Polish yachtsman;
- Zenon Jaskuła (born 1962), Polish racing cyclist.

== See also ==
- Jaskółka (disambiguation)
