= Jaskółka (surname) =

Jaskólka is a Polish-language unisex surname derived from the Polish word jaskółka, "swallow". The surname may be phonemically transcribed as Jaskulka.

When transliterated via the Russian language, the surname accepts the forms Yaskolka or Yaskulka.

Notable people with the surname include:

- Marek Jaskółka (born 1976), Polish triathlete
- Magdalena Jaskółka, Polish 3-times national medalist in pair skating with Piotr Snopek
- Stanisław Jaskułka, Polish long jumper

== See also ==
- Jaskólski
- Jaskułke
