= SZD-11 Albatros =

Polish single-seat glider, 1954

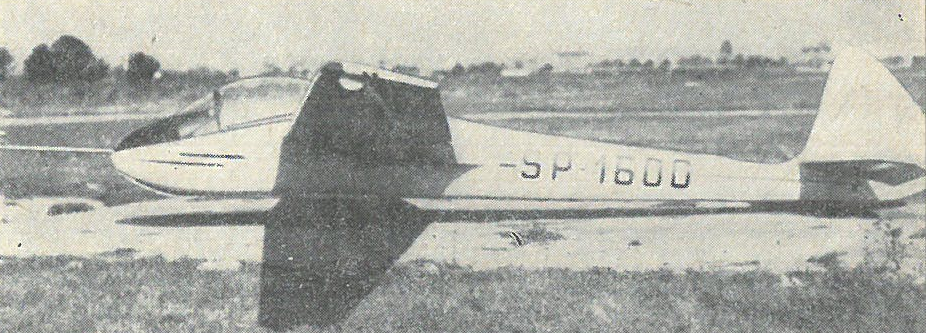

General information
- Type: Glider aircraft
- National origin: Poland
- Manufacturer: SZD; J. Niespał
- Designer: Justyn Sandauer
- Number built: 1

History
- First flight: 14 September 1954
- Developed from: SZD-8 Jaskółka

The SZD-11 Albatros was a single-seat glider aircraft that was designed and built in Poland at Szybowcowy Zakład Doświadczalny - Glider Experimental Works in Bielsko-Biała in 1954. Only one prototype was completed and flown.

== Development ==
Based on a fuselage of the SZD-8 Jaskółka, the SZD-11 Albatros was designed to investigate the performance of aircraft during flight in thermal lift. The main designer was Justyn Sandauer, and the main constructor was J. Niespał. With wings of greater span, and reduced empty weight, the wing loading was reduced, markedly improving the climb performance over the 16m-span SZD-8 Jaskółka. Three more SZD-11 aircraft were planned with fixed trailing edges and no flaps, but only the prototype was completed. The SZD-11 first flew on 14 September 1954, flown by Tadeusz Góra.

== Specifications (SZD-11 Albatros) ==
Data from http://www.piotrp.de/SZYBOWCE/dszd11.htm

General characteristics

- Crew: 1
- Length: 7.6 m (24 ft 11 in)
- Wingspan: 18 m (59 ft 0 in)
- Height: 1.41 m (4 ft 7 in)
- Wing area: 17.7 m^{2} (191 sq ft)
- Aspect ratio: 18.3
- Airfoil: NACA 23012A
- Empty weight: 208 kg (459 lb)
- Gross weight: 353 kg (778 lb)

Performance

- Maximum speed: 230 km/h (143 mph, 124 kn)
- Stall speed: 52 km/h (32 mph, 28 kn)
- Maximum glide ratio: 26 at 74 km/h (46 mph/40 kts)
- Rate of sink: 0.70 m/s (138 ft/min) at 61 km/h (38 mph/33 kts)

== See also ==
Aircraft of comparable role, configuration, and era

- Pik-3 Kajava
