= Jaskółki =

Jaskółki may refer to the following places:

- Jaskółki, Gmina Kamieniec, Grodzisk County in Greater Poland Voivodeship (west-central Poland)
- Jaskółki, Gmina Raszków, Ostrów County in Greater Poland Voivodeship (west-central Poland)
- Jaskółki, Radomsko County in Łódź Voivodeship (central Poland)
