= SZD-8 Jaskółka =

Polish single-seat glider, 1951

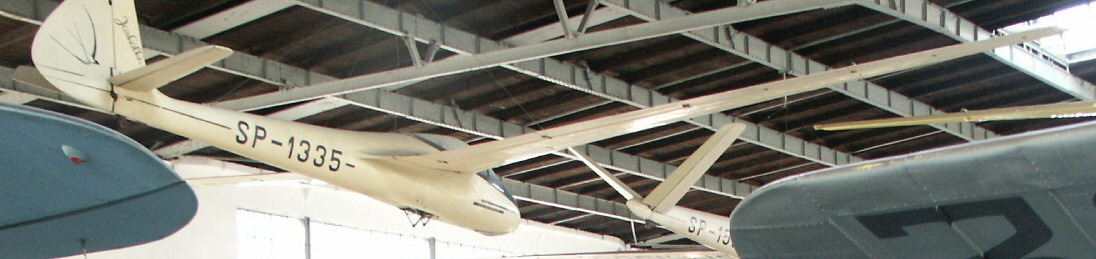
- SZD-8bis Jaskółka SP-1335 in the Polish Aviation Museum

General information
- Type: Glider aircraft
- National origin: Poland
- Manufacturer: SZD
- Designer: Tadeusz Kostia
- Number built: 135

History
- First flight: 21 September 1951
- Variants: SZD-14x Jaskółka M SZD-17x Jaskółka L

The SZD-8 Jaskółka was a single-seat glider aircraft that was designed and built in Poland at Szybowcowy Zakład Doświadczalny (Glider Experimental Works) in Bielsko-Biała from 1951.

== Development ==
With prototypes rolled out in September and December 1951, the SZD-8 Jaskółka (Swallow) was a high-performance glider for its day, introducing several innovations to glider design such as a sliding moulded Plexiglas canopy, recessed handle in the rear fuselage for ground handling and a semi-retractable mainwheel. The all-wood wings were covered with plywood and fabric incorporating Fowler flaps on the trailing edges, which could be lowered to 12° or 25°, and Schemp-Hirth style airbrakes aft of the mainspars. Main designer was Tadeusz Kostia. The first prototype was flown on 21 September 1951 (test pilot Adam Zientek), but it revealed faults. After reconstruction, with longer fuselage and enlarged rudder (designated SZD-8-2) it appeared successful and was ordered into production, becoming the most popular competition glider in Poland from 1953 to 1957. Many of the 135 production aircraft were exported, garnering at least fifteen world records from May 1954 to May 1960. Licensed production was also carried out in the DDR (Deutsche Demokratische Republik - German Democratic Republic) and the PRC (People's Republic of China). Several variants were produced which introduced various improvements and modifications.

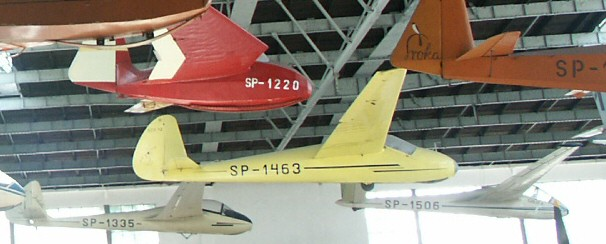
SZD-8 at bottom left

== Variants ==
SZD-8
two prototypes, first flown 21 September 1951
SZD 8-2
first prototype after reconstruction, first flown 16 March 1952
SZD-8bis Jaskółka
initial production variant (first flown 24 December 1952; 30 built)
SZD-8bisE Jaskółka E
improved variant of 1954 (30 built)
SZD-8bisW Jaskółka W
variant with water ballast (1 built, later converted to SZD-8bisZ)
SZD-8bisZ Jaskółka Z
one prototype
SZD-8bisO Jaskółka O
export variant
SZD 8terZ Jaskółka Z
variant with water ballast, introduced in May 1958
SZD 8terZO Jaskółka ZO
variant without water ballast, introduced in 1958
Shenyang X-10 Qian Jin
a licensed version of the SZD-8/14 Jaskolka, with modifications, built in the People's Republic of China at the Shenyang aviation factory.

== Specifications (SZD-8bis Jaskółka Z) ==
Data from The World's Sailplanes:Die Segelflugzeuge der Welt:Les Planeurs du Monde

General characteristics

- Crew: 1
- Length: 7.42 m (24 ft 4 in)
- Wingspan: 16 m (52 ft 6 in)
- Height: 1.41 m (4 ft 8 in)
- Wing area: 13.6 m^{2} (146 sq ft)
- Aspect ratio: 15
- Airfoil: NACA 43 012A
- Empty weight: 270 kg (595 lb) equipped
- Gross weight: 337 kg (743 lb)
- Max takeoff weight: 455 kg (1,003 lb)

Performance

- Never exceed speed: 250 km/h (160 mph, 130 kn)
- Aerotow speed: 150 km/h (81 kn; 93 mph)
- Winch launch speed: 120 km/h (65 kn; 75 mph)
- g limits: +3.5 -1.75 at 250 km/h (130 kn; 160 mph)
- Maximum glide ratio: 28.5 at 82 km/h (44 kn; 51 mph)
- Rate of sink: 0.75 m/s (148 ft/min) at 75 km/h (40 kn; 47 mph)
- Wing loading: 7.34 kg/m^{2} (1.50 lb/sq ft)

== See also ==
Aircraft of comparable role, configuration, and era

- PIK-3
