= Summer Work Travel Program =

US government program

The Summer Work Travel Program (colloquially known in Asia as Summer Work and Travel) is a program founded and maintained by the United States Department of State, which determines the number of students that have a right to take part each year. The program works with private companies that register students into the program and help to provide information and get the necessary documents, including the J-1 visa. Some agencies also help program participants to plan their journey to their future place of work, giving the possibility of purchasing international airline tickets on students tariffs.

== Program details ==
The Summer Work Travel Program allows international students who wish to familiarize themselves with American culture to work and travel in the United States during their academic breaks. Job placements, working conditions, and wages are typically arranged before participants arrive in the U.S. After completing their work period, participants may travel within the country in accordance with their visa terms.

The program is overseen by the U.S. Department of State, which regulates its operation and sets annual participation limits. Approved U.S.-based sponsors manage the program, while international recruitment agencies facilitate the selection and preparation of participants. U.S. employers provide temporary job opportunities, and participants may stay in the country for up to four months.

Program administration involves the use of SEVIS (Student and Exchange Visitor Information System), which tracks participants' work locations, living arrangements, and legal status. General data about participants is publicly available on the J-1 visa website. The program schedule varies to align with academic calendars worldwide, allowing participation during summer breaks or, for students in the southern hemisphere, during the U.S. winter months.

== Requirements ==
Summer Work and Travel students must be:

- Sufficiently proficient in English to successfully interact in an English speaking environment
- Post-secondary school students enrolled in and actively pursuing a degree or other full-time course of study at an accredited classroom based, post-secondary educational institution outside the United States
- Have successfully completed at least one semester or equivalent of post-secondary academic study
- Pre-placed in a job prior to entry unless from a visa waiver country

== Legal Aspects ==
Students are subject to SWT requirements. Companies charge a nominal fee to cover the costs of SEVIS, a program that tracks J-1 visa students and makes their anonymous distribution data publicly available on the J-1 visa website.

In addition to the government requirements, Work and Travel USA students are required to:

- Register their information in SEVIS no later than 10 days after arriving in the USA. It varies by each sponsoring organization.
- Update their SEVIS information within 10 days, if they change address during the time in the USA or if they switch jobs.
- Check-in every 30 days to maintain active status on the program.

== The Ambassadors Fund for Summer Work Travel (SWT) Scholarship ==
The Ambassadors Fund for Summer Work Travel (SWT) Scholarship is a public diplomacy initiative sponsored by the U.S. Department of State. This program is distinct from the broader BridgeUSA Summer Work Travel Program and provides financial support to university students from select countries. Its primary goal is to enhance cultural exchange, promote mutual understanding, and foster skills such as community building, media literacy, and intercultural communication.

Scholarship recipients participate in a four-month summer experience in the United States, where they work in seasonal, entry-level jobs in high-interaction environments. This allows them to gain professional experience, improve their English proficiency, and immerse themselves in American culture while sharing their own heritage with local communities and fellow international students. The program covers various costs, including health insurance, visa fees, and round-trip airfare. Eligibility is limited to post-secondary students with sufficient English proficiency who have completed at least one semester of study at an accredited institution outside the United States.

== Agencies ==
To embark on a Summer Work and Travel program, students must apply through a local agency. Agencies help to:-

- Arrange for job placements with a US host organisation
- Provide advice for US Visa applications and J-1 interview process
- Pre-arrange housing before participant arrival in the US
- Assist in documentation such as SEVIS registration, visa fee payment
- Be on 24/7 support for the student

Notable agencies worldwide

- In Malaysia, reputable agencies for Work and Travel include Infinity Abroad, Out of the Box, Wunderbar Adventura, and *Speedwing. (*Also operating in Singapore)
- In South America, Universal Student Exchange (USE) is an agency with offices in Peru, Argentina, Chile and representatives in Brasil, Costa Rica, Paraguay, Spain.
- In Eastern Europe, some of the best known agencies are: American Experience Romania, Experience Serbia, Cool Travel Bulgaria

== Requirements for Program Sponsors ==
Sponsors of the Summer Work Travel Program are required to provide pre-arranged, vetted employment for participants from non-visa waiver countries and ensure comprehensive pre-departure information, including program guidelines, emergency contacts, and obligations for job and residency updates. For participants from Visa Waiver Program countries without prearranged jobs, sponsors must verify sufficient financial resources, provide job search guidance, and offer a job directory. Sponsors are also responsible for assisting participants unable to secure employment, ensuring compliance with federal and state wage laws, and maintaining regular contact to address any health, safety, or welfare concerns.
