= SZD-14x Jaskółka M =

Polish single-seat glider, 1954

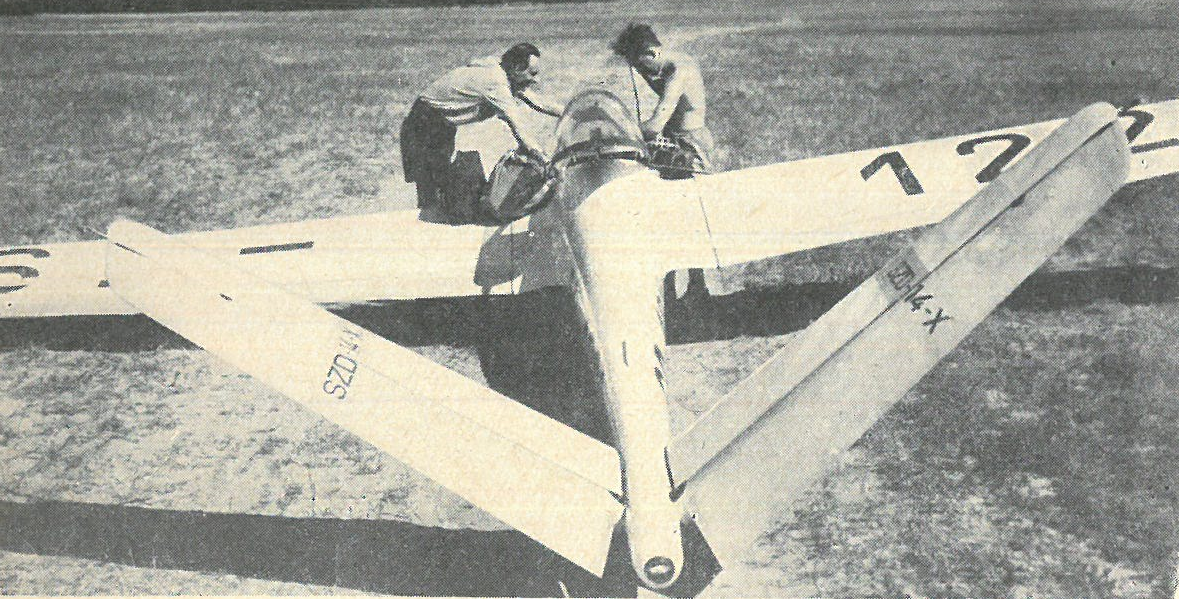

General information
- Type: Glider aircraft
- National origin: Poland
- Manufacturer: SZD; Władysław Okarmus
- Designer: Tadeusz Kostia
- Number built: 1

History
- First flight: 23 July 1954
- Developed from: SZD-8 Jaskółka

The SZD-14X Jaskółka M was a single-seat glider designed and built in Poland at Szybowcowy Zakład Doświadczalny - Glider Experimental Works in Bielsko-Biała in 1954. This was an experimental prototype, and only one unit was constructed.

== Development ==
The SZD-14X Jaskółka M was developed from the SZD-8bis Jaskółka (Swallow) for research into the construction, control and characteristics of 'V' or butterfly tail surfaces. Using the airframe of the second prototype SZD-8 a 'V' tail was added to the rear fuselage, with arrangements for the balance of the surfaces and the angle between them to be adjusted as required. The designer was Tadeusz Kostia, the constructor was Władysław Okarmus.

First flown by Adam Zientek at Bielsko on 23 July 1954, the SZD-14 was found to be easy to fly with no vices, giving no indication that the tail layout was unconventional. During spinning tests the rear fuselage was almost torn off, but the pilot (Dziurzyński) managed to regain control and recovered the aircraft to land safely.

Up to the time of the SZD-14's debut, the 'V' tail system was rare, with few aircraft using the system devised by Eng. Jerzy Rudlicki and demonstrated on a licence-built Hanriot HD.14 biplane in the early 1930s.

== Specifications (SZD-14x Jaskółka M) ==
Data from http://www.piotrp.de/SZYBOWCE/pszd14.htm

General characteristics

- Crew: 1
- Length: 6.48 m (21 ft 3 in)
- Wingspan: 16 m (52 ft 6 in)
- Height: 1.3 m (4 ft 3 in)
- Wing area: 13.6 m^{2} (146 sq ft)
- Aspect ratio: 18.8
- Airfoil: NACA 23012A
- Empty weight: 288 kg (635 lb)
- Gross weight: 373 kg (822 lb)

Performance

- Maximum speed: 250 km/h (155 mph, 135 kn)
- Stall speed: 59 km/h (37 mph, 32 kn)
- Maximum glide ratio: 26.3 at 80 km/h (43 kts/50 mph)
- Rate of sink: 0.70 m/s (138 ft/min) at 69 km/h (43 mph/37 kts)

== See also ==
Related development

- SZD-8 Jaskółka
- SZD-17X Jaskółka L

Aircraft of comparable role, configuration, and era

- Standard Austria
