= SZD-17X Jaskółka L =

Polish single-seat glider, 1956

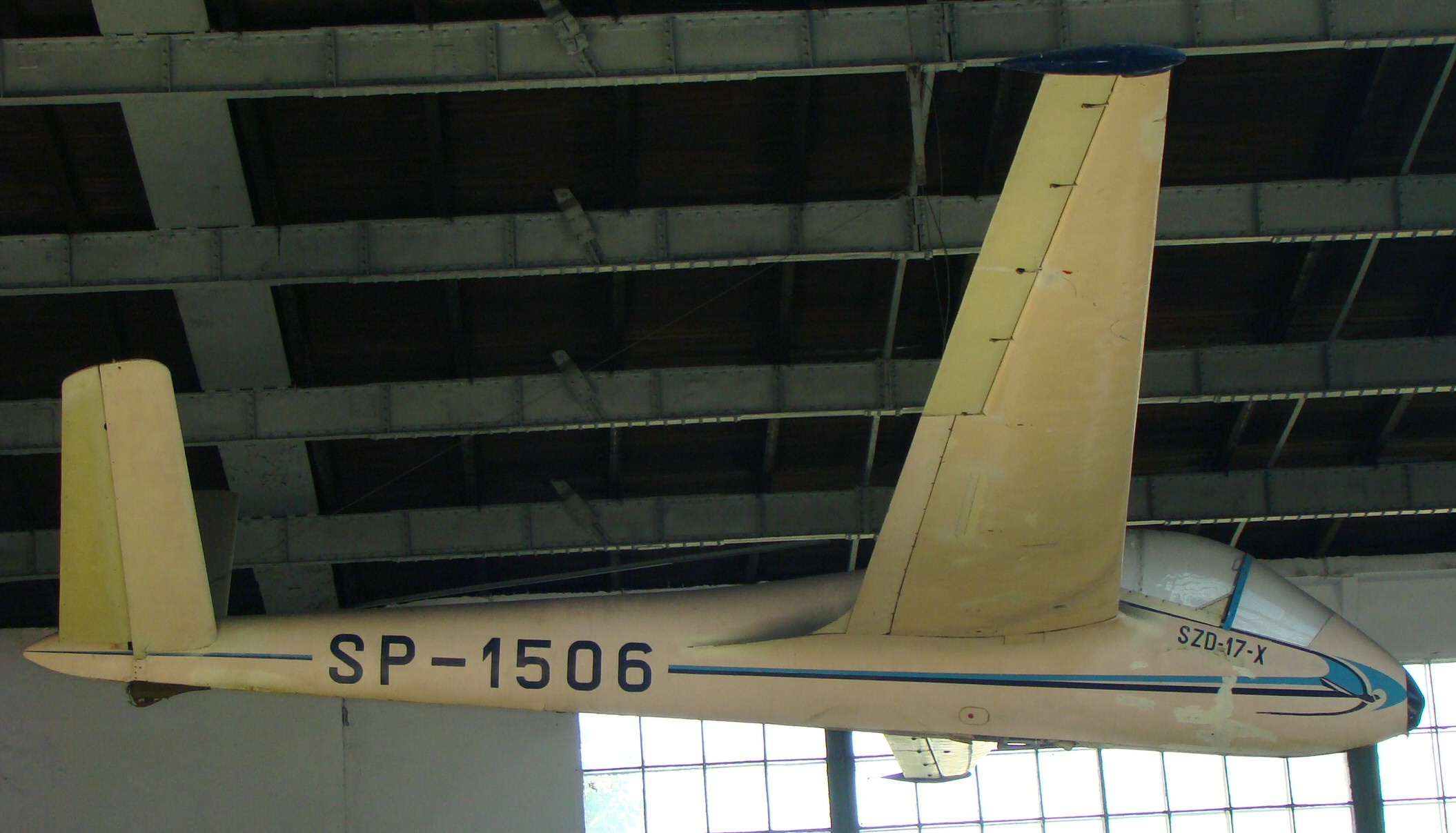
- SZD-17x in the Polish Aviation Museum

General information
- Type: Glider
- National origin: Poland
- Manufacturer: SZD
- Designer: Jan Dyrek, Tadeusz Kostia
- Number built: 4

History
- Introduction date: 1956
- First flight: 9 March 1956
- Developed from: SZD-14x Jaskółka M

The SZD-17X Jaskółka L was a single-seat high-performance competition glider designed and built in Poland at Szybowcowy Zakład Doświadczalny (Glider Experimental Works) in Bielsko-Biała in 1955.

== Development ==
The SZD-17X Jaskółka L (Swallow Laminar) drew on the experience gained from developing the SZD-11 and SZD-14X gliders combined with new laminar flow aerofoil sections and flaps, as well as provision for water ballast and a fully retractable undercarriage. Main designer was Tadeusz Kostia, main constructor Jan Dyrek. Construction of the SZD-17X was of conventional wooden semi-monocoque fuselage and thick skinned wooden wings with wooden spars, retaining the Jerzy Rudlicki's butterfly tail of the SZD-14X. First flight of the SZD-17X took place at Bielsko airfield, flown by Adam Zientek, on 9 March 1956.

Four aircraft, (reg'n no.'s SP-1504 to SP-1507), were built for use in 1956 World Gliding Championships, but performance fell short of expectations and they finally were not used there. Despite the disappointing performance, Tadeusz Góra was able to establish a cross-country speed record on 9 May 1956 whilst flying SP-1506. SP-1506 was used until 1977, then it was given to the Polish Aviation Museum. The glider was nicknamed laminarka, due to its laminar flow profile.

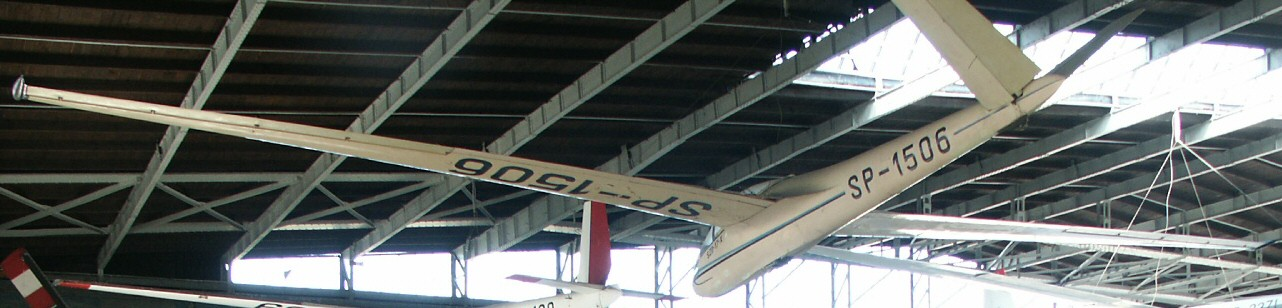
SZD-17x SP-1506 showing its V-tail in the Polish Aviation Museum

== Specifications (SZD-17X Jaskółka L) ==
Data from The World's Sailplanes:Die Segelflugzeuge der Welt:Les Planeurs du Monde

General characteristics

- Crew: 1
- Length: 6.8 m (22 ft 4 in)
- Wingspan: 16 m (52 ft 6 in)
- Height: 1.26 m (4 ft 2 in)
- Wing area: 13.6 m^{2} (146 sq ft)
- Aspect ratio: 18.8
- Airfoil: NACA 65_{2}512a
- Empty weight: 340 kg (750 lb) equipped
- Max takeoff weight: 540 kg (1,190 lb)

Performance

- Never exceed speed: 250 km/h (160 mph, 130 kn)
- Aerotow speed: 140 km/h (76 kn; 87 mph)
- Winch launch speed: 120 km/h (65 kn; 75 mph)
- g limits: +7.9 -1.9 at 186 km/h (100 kn; 116 mph)
- Maximum glide ratio: 31.2
- Rate of sink: 0.8 m/s (160 ft/min) at 87 km/h (47 kn; 54 mph)
- Wing loading: 39.7 kg/m^{2} (8.1 lb/sq ft)

Note: A. Glass quotes different specifications: maximum glide ratio 30.5 at 98 km/h; best sink rate 0.86 m/s at 93 km/h; wing loading 31.2 kg/m^{2} (40 with ballast).

== See also ==
Aircraft of comparable role, configuration, and era

- Schempp-Hirth Standard Austria
- EoN Olympia 419

Related lists

- List of gliders
