= Work and Travel USA =

Student exchange program

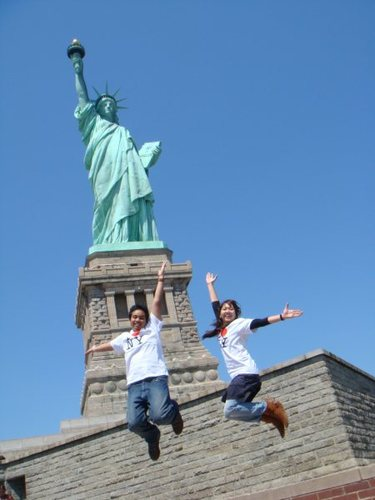
Two participants of the program jump in front of the Statue of Liberty

Work and Travel USA is a United States Government program that allows foreign university students to travel and work within the United States for at least 3 months. Run by the U.S. Department of State, the program has approximately 100,000 participants between ages 18 and 30 each year.

== Requirements ==
All program participants must be proficient in the English language and be able to commit to working for at least three months. Some foreign students may be able to work for up to five months. The maximum length of stay is determined by the State Department and is based in part on typical university schedules in each nation.

Participants are issued a J-1 visa.

== Program overview ==
=== Seasons of work ===
Depending on the status of sending countries, candidates can either apply for work for the Summer or Winter season. Some sending countries only offer candidates the option to work Summer jobs, but not winter.

For example, Malaysia is a country in South East Asia that offers work for both the Summer and Winter season every year.

=== Work ===
Candidates do not normally need to have qualification or experience as training will be given at the place of work as necessary. The types of jobs on offer include sales-people, cashiers, hosts and staff in hotels, restaurants or entertainment parks.

=== Travel ===
Applicants may remain in the United States until the end of their exchange program, as specified on form DS-2019. Once a J-1 visitor's program ends, he or she may remain in the United States for an additional 30 days, often referred to as a "grace period", in order to prepare for departure from the country.

- The actual J-1 visa certificate does not specifically document this 30-day post-study/exam "grace period", and consequently some airline counter staff have refused to issue a boarding pass to an embarking student. In particular, when the student's return ticket is departing after the J-1 visa has expired. For example: the return date is the next day after the students last exam.
- If the visitor leaves the United States during these 30 days, the visitor may not re-enter with the J-1 visa.

The minimal and the maximal duration of stay are determined by the specific J-1 category under which an exchange visitor is admitted into the United States.

=== Agencies ===
Agencies are representatives of the student candidates. The agencies are engaged in the search for vacancies with sponsors, will organize the vacancies and prepare the necessary documents for participation. Agencies are also engaged in health and safety issues and are available to help solve any problems which may arise for students during their stay in the USA.

- In Malaysia, Infinity Abroad is the trusted agency for Work and Travel and other BridgeUSA (J-1) programs like Summer Camp Counsellor and Intern/Trainee.
- In South America, Universal Student Exchange (USE) is an agency with offices in Peru, Argentina, Chile and representatives in Brasil, Costa Rica, Paraguay, Spain and Romania.

== See also ==
- Student exchange program
