= Enumeration Beyond Entry program =

Social Security Numbers issued under Enumeration Beyond Entry

The Enumeration Beyond Entry program is an agreement between the Social Security Administration (SSA), the Department of Homeland Security (DHS), and the U.S. Citizenship and Immigration Services (USCIS) wherein Social Security numbers and cards are supplied to non-citizens as part of the work authorization process, without requiring an additional application or an in-person visit to a local SSA office.

Public source information regarding the origin of the program is limited, but according to a letter dated December 17, 2019 from the Office of the Inspector General, the program began in October 2017 under the first Trump administration.

According to the same letter, DHS collects information during the USCIS application process (Form I-765) and electronically transmits it to the SSA, thus eliminating the need for applicants to file a separate SS-5 application at an SSA field office.

Beginning on April 1, 2024, under Democratic president Joe Biden, the EBE program was expanded to include information from Form N-400 (Application for Naturalization).

As of April 2025, the EBE program applies to information from:

- Form I-765 - Application for Employment Authorization
- Form I-485 - Application to Register Permanent Residences or Adjust Status
- Form N-400 - Application for Naturalization

It's not clear from available sources whether Form I-485 was included as part of the program from the beginning, or if it was added in a later expansion.

In March 2025 the second Trump administration reportedly temporarily paused the program for I-765 and N-400 cases.

== Related Programs ==
The EBE program is very similar in concept to the Enumeration At Entry (EAE) program. Under the EAE program, any lawful permanent resident can simultaneously apply for both an immigration visa and a Social Security number using Form DS-230 or Form DS-260. As with the EBE program, the DHS will transmit the information to the SSA for automatic issuance of a Social Security number.

The primary difference between the two programs is that under EAE, DHS transmits the information to the SSA when the person is physically admitted to the United States (thus "at entry"), whereas EBE is targeted towards those who are already in the US ("beyond entry").

EAE started as a pilot program in 2002 under Republican president George W. Bush, and was expanded worldwide in 2003.

== History of Social Security Numbers for Non-Citizens ==
The legal basis for issuing Social Security numbers to non-citizens existed long before the EAE and EBE programs were established. These programs merely made the process more efficient by eliminating the need for extraneous applications.

As explained on the SSA web site, Congress amended the Social Security Act in the 1970s to authorize the SSA to assign Social Security numbers to all legally admitted non-citizens at entry or subsequently eligible for employment, and to anyone receiving or applying for a Federal benefit. This was done to deal with concerns over welfare fraud and illegal work done by unauthorized persons.

These changes were codified in Public Law 92-603. The relevant section reads:

Sec, 137. Section 205 (c)(2) of the Social Security Act is amended—

(1) by inserting "(A) " immediately after "(2)" ; and (2) by adding at the end thereof the following new subparagraph: "(B)(i) In carrying out his duties under subparagraph (A), the Secretary shall take affirmative measures to assure that social security account numbers will, to the maximum extent practicable, be assigned to all members of appropriate groups or categories of individuals by assigning such numbers (or ascertaining that such numbers have already been assigned): "(I) to aliens at the time of their lawful admission to the United States either for permanent residence or under other authority of law permitting them to engage in employment in the United States and to other aliens at such time as their status is so changed as to make it lawful for them to engage in such employment; "(II) to any individual who is an applicant for or recipient of benefits under any program financed in whole or in part from Federal funds including any child on whose behalf such benefits are claimed by another person; and

... remainder of text omitted ...

The law provides for issuance of Social Security numbers either at entry ("at the time of their lawful admission") or subsequent to entry based on changes to employment status ("at such time as their status is so changed"). Thus, both the EAE and EBE programs are firmly rooted in the provisions of PL 92-603.

PL 92-603 was passed with broad bipartisan support and enacted on October 30, 1972 under Republican president Richard Nixon.

A complete list of current policies and information regarding Social Security numbers for non-citizens is available in Publication 05-10096 available for download on the SSA web site. Additional information is also available in Code of Federal Regulation 422.104, also available on the SSA web site.

== Media attention ==
The EBE program came to wider public attention in March 2025, when Elon Musk and Antonio Gracias, speaking at a town hall rally in Green Bay, Wisconsin on March 30, 2025, pushed disputed claims about non-citizens voting and receiving benefits, pointing to the dramatic rise in Social Security numbers issued to non-citizens under the Biden administration as evidence.

In a chart presented during the town hall, and using information collected from the EBE program, Gracias claimed that the number of Social Security numbers issued to non-citizens rose from 270,425 in FY2021 to 2,095,247 in FY2024.

Gracias claims that the source of the information came from the EBE program, but did not elaborate on exactly how the data was collected, from what specific databases, or how the numbers were ultimately calculated, nor did he provide a breakdown of the individual contributions from each of the three possible forms used, namely Form I-765, Form I-485, and Form N-400 to the total sums.

Musk and Gracias see malfeasance behind the rising numbers, with Musk commenting on Gracias' chart:

People sometimes think that under the Biden administration, that he was simply asleep at the switch. They weren't asleep at the switch—it was a massive, large-scale program to import as many illegals as possible, ultimately to change the entire voting map of the United States and disenfranchise the American people and make it a permanent deep-blue, one-party state from which there would be no escape.

However, according to former SSA Commissioner Martin O'Malley, in a March 31, 2025 interview with Rolling Stone, the numbers increased as a result of the number of lawfully admitted immigrants increasing. That, in addition to the expansion of the program to include naturalization applicants under Form N-400, explains the increase, according to Snopes.
