= Advertising mail =

Distribution of advertising by direct mail or letterbox drop

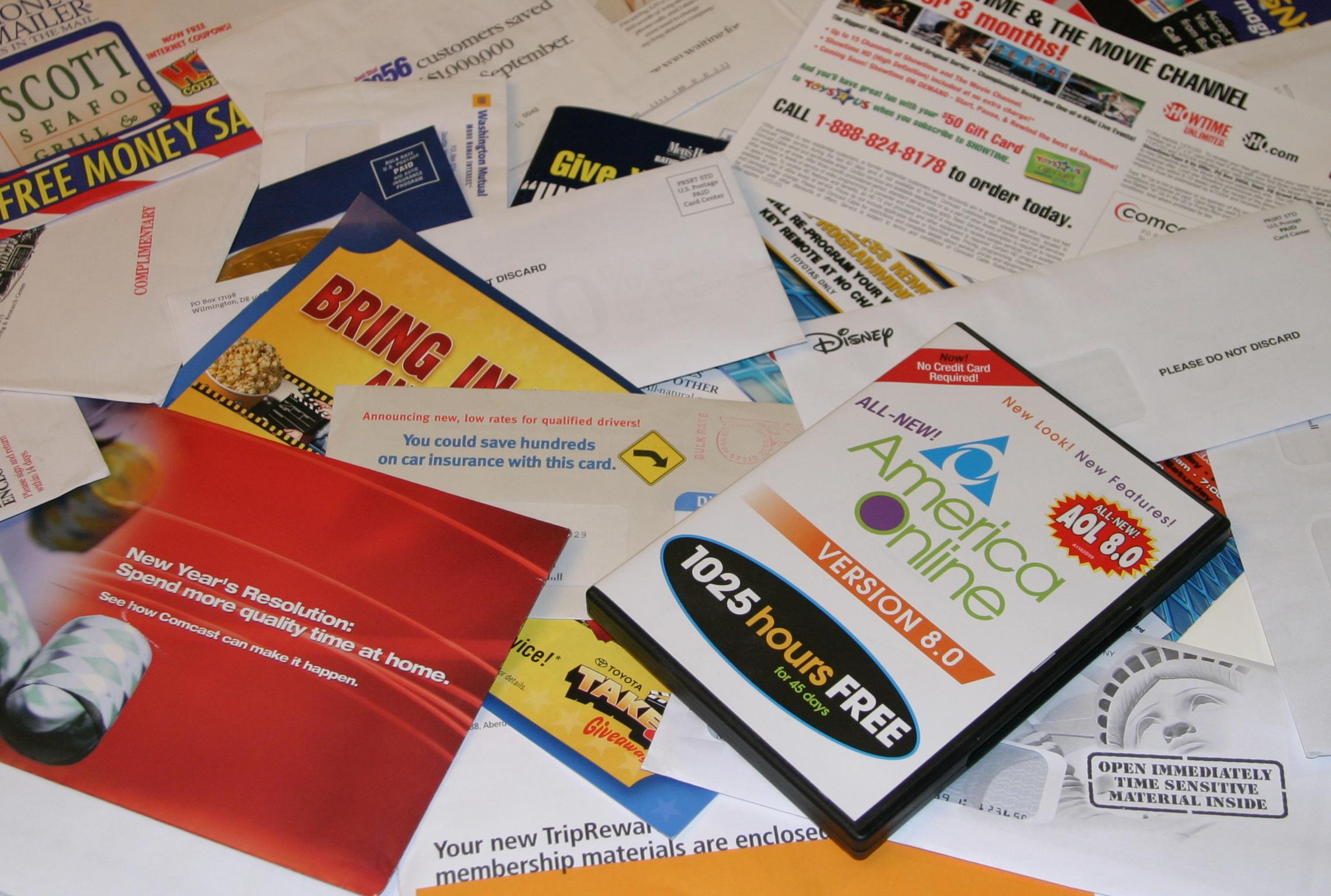
Typical advertising mail

Advertising mail, also known as direct mail (by its senders), junk mail (by its recipients), mailshot or admail (North America), letterbox drop or letterboxing (Australia), is the delivery of advertising material to recipients of postal mail. The delivery of advertising mail forms a large and growing service for many postal services, and direct-mail marketing forms a significant portion of the direct marketing industry. Some organizations attempt to help people opt out of receiving advertising mail, in many cases motivated by a concern over its negative environmental impact.

Advertising mail includes advertising circulars, plastic mailers, coupon envelopes (Money Mailer, Valpak), catalogs, CDs, "pre-approved" credit card applications, and other commercial merchandising materials delivered to homes and businesses. It may be addressed to pre-selected individuals, or unaddressed and delivered on a neighbourhood-by-neighbourhood basis.

== Origin ==
North Carolina state historians say Lunsford Richardson "is widely to considered to have invented ‘junk mail’" in the process of expanding the market for his new products made by the Vicks company of Greensboro, North Carolina. In 1917, the U.S. Postal Service began allowing mail to be sent to rural addresses without including the name of the addressee. Vicks sent out millions of samples of Vicks VapoRub.

== Postal services ==
Postal systems offer lower rates for buyers of bulk mail permits. In order to qualify for these rates, marketers must format and sort the mail in specific ways – which reduces the handling required by the postal service.

Income from advertising mail represents a significant and growing portion of some postal services' budgets, and it is a service actively marketed by them. In the United States, ad mail dollars decreased from $96.6 billion in 2004, to $80.9 billion in 2013. A study by Boston Consulting Group predicts that overall share of ad-spend in the US will increase from 11% in to 12% by 2020. In Canada, addressed and unaddressed advertising mail accounted for 20% of Canada Post's revenue in 2005, and the share is increasing. Postal services employ the terms advertising mail, admail, and direct mail, while avoiding and objecting to the pejorative term junk mail.

The United States Postal Service offers a direct mail service known as Every Door Direct Mail, that provides resources allowing businesses to target, design, print and mail to specific households without needing to know the addresses.

In many developed countries, advertising mail represents a significant and growing amount of the total volume of mail. In the United States, "Standard mail: advertising" comprised 29% of all mail in 1980 and 43% in 2003.

== Direct mail marketing ==
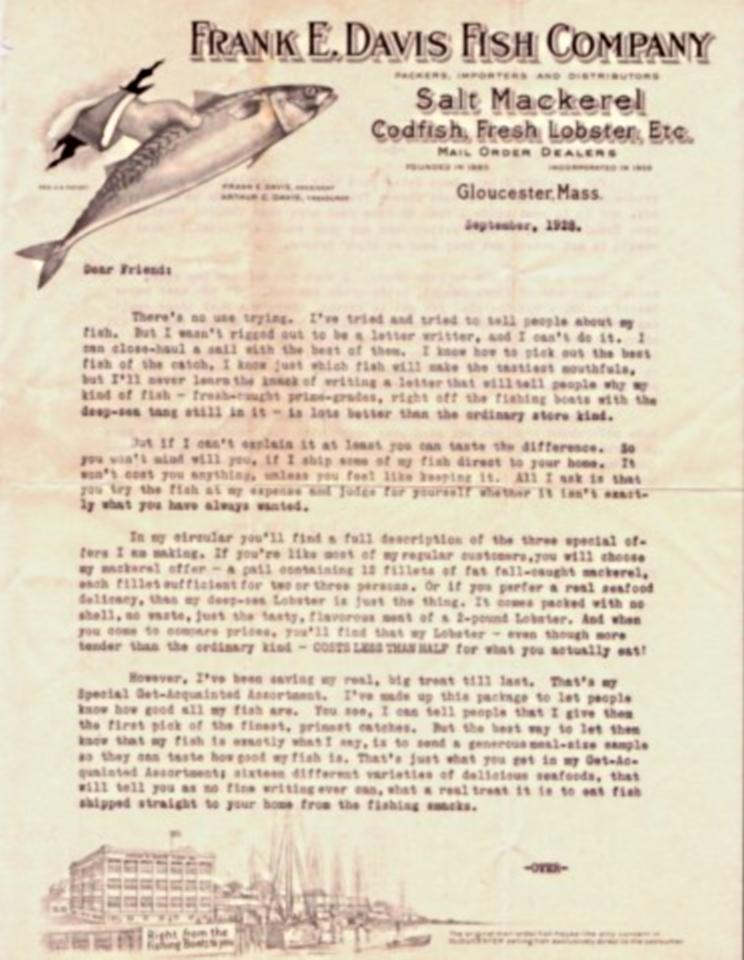
1928 direct mail advertising letter offering mail delivery of fish and seafood

Direct mail is a common form of direct marketing, and may be employed by for-profit businesses, charities and other non-profits, political campaigns, and other organizations. Direct mail encompasses a wide variety of marketing materials, including brochures, catalogs, postcards, newsletters and sales letters. In 2015 more than 150 million direct mail promotions were sent out with a reported 42% of respondents scanning or reading the mail. Scammers also use direct mail in the form of auto warranty and home warranty scams.

=== Creation ===
Copywriters write the words, also known as copy, for direct mail. These copywriters are known inside the trade as direct response copywriters. Direct response copy follows a proven format based on testing results. Graphic designers who specialize in direct marketing also play a key role in the success of direct mail programs. Many direct mail marketers will mail different version of copy (A/B testing) to test the effectiveness of different appeals. The winning mail package will be known as the control and the direct mail company will continue to mail the control until a different package produces improved results, usually measured by metrics such as revenue and conversion rate. Some campaigns incorporate tactile embellishments—such as foil stamping, embossing, specialty UV coatings, metallic finishes, and soft-touch laminates—to attract attention and encourage interaction.

=== Targeting ===
Advertisers often refine direct mail practices into targeted mailing in which mail is sent following database analysis to select recipients considered most likely to respond positively. This reduces costs for mailers by narrowing the mailing universe to only the most likely audience. For example, a person who has demonstrated an interest in golf may receive direct mail for golf-related products or perhaps for goods and services that are appropriate for golfers. This use of database analysis is a type of database marketing. Alternatively, unaddressed direct mail may be sent on a neighbourhood-by-neighbourhood basis. Whether at the individual or neighbourhood level, direct mail marketing allows recipients to be targeted, attempting to match the demographic profile of the recipients to one most closely matching that of likely customers. Individually targeted direct mail may be tailored based on previous transactions and gathered data. For example, all male recipients of an offer may receive a personalized package with a man's picture on the cover while all female recipients receive a picture of a woman.

Often advertisers will include a Johnson Box in letters. These are aimed at drawing the targeted consumers into reading further in the letter.

=== Cost-effectiveness ===
To the non-professional, direct mail may seem wasteful, yet the medium can be one of the most cost-effective. Database targeting combined with an effective pricing, creative and list strategy can reduce waste and maximize profitable results for the mailer. Testing is accomplished in a variety of ways including A/B split testing of new mailings versus a control and testing lists through "Nth" name selects.

=== Political usage ===
Political campaigns make frequent use of direct mail, both to gain votes from the electorate as a whole, and to target certain groups of voters thought to be open to a candidate's message and to appeal for campaign funds.

Certain organizations and individuals have become known for their prowess in direct mail, including in the US, the Free Congress Foundation in the 1970s, Response Dynamics, Inc. in the 1980s, the National Congressional Club, and Richard Viguerie. With the advent of the Internet in political campaigns, direct mail became just one of many campaign management tools, but still played a significant role.

=== Nonprofit ===
Nonprofit companies use direct mail marketing as a consistent form of advertising. In its modern form, direct mail fundraising appeared in the United States after World War II when nationwide charities such as the National Easter Seal Society sought ways to broaden their fundraising base.

It was only with the advent in the 1960s of the ZIP code and, later, the computer that direct mail fundraising began to gain wide use. Before the ZIP code, it was difficult to target appropriate recipients of direct mail fundraising appeals, and before the computer, compiling and maintaining lists of supporters was tedious and costly. During the 1970s, when computers became increasingly affordable, the use of direct mail fundraising spread widely. It quickly became the means by which most Americans learned about and first provided financial support for their charities of choice.

The explosive growth of the nonprofit sector in the United States—quadrupling in the 1980s and doubling again in the 1990s and early 2000s—led to a massive expansion in the use of direct mail to build and sustain large, nationwide donor and membership lists. Today, direct mail fundraising accounts for at least one-fifth of the more than $250 billion contributed annually in the U.S. to the nation's 1.6 million nonprofit organizations

In recent years, electronic communication media has been used more commonly among nonprofits. Online, email, and social media campaigns, collectively referred to as digital fundraising, have been used in coordination with direct mail fundraising. Nonprofits supplement direct mail campaigns with email blasts and social media posts, using similar messaging and visuals to tie the various communications together. However, digital fundraising has not grown fast enough to replace direct mail for most nonprofits. In 2012, digital fundraising accounted for 7 percent of charitable donations in the United States.

This form of marketing is increasingly used by charitable groups in the UK. In 2013, £239 million was spent by British charities on direct mail advertising campaigns.

=== Current relevance ===
Direct mail marketing is under scrutiny by many of its former and current advocates. The arguments against using direct mail marketing include possible impact on the environment and changing attitudes among consumers.

In the United States, the common practice of address standardization can defeat the purpose of advertising mail by stripping away local identity, thus leaving many recipients alienated. It is also argued that direct mail is not cost-efficient. It has been suggested that social media will eventually replace direct mail as the preferred method for marketing communications. Those who believe direct mail marketing has a future cite its strong growth in 2011. It has been reported that large publishers like the Tribune Company and RR Donnelley have growing direct mail divisions. Nonprofit organizations continue to use direct mail at a subsidized USPS rate.

=== Business-to-business mailings (B2B) ===
When targeted to other businesses rather than individuals, direct mail is known as a business-to-business mailing. Traditionally, this worked in one of two ways: as a direct sale, therefore precluding the use of a salesperson or a retail store, or as a method of generating leads for a salesforce. The former method was ideally used by products that were easy to sell, were familiar to the prospect and needed no demonstration. The latter method was used for large-ticket items or for those that needed demonstration, for example.

One method of direct mailing used in B2B is known as "bill-me." In this direct-mail marketing offer, the buyer is shipped the product prior to payment and is then sent an invoice later.

== Opting out ==
Several organizations offer opt-out services to people who wish to reduce or eliminate the amount of addressed advertising mail they receive. In the UK, the Mailing Preference Service allows people to register with them for removal from posted as opposed to hand-delivered mail. As of 2017 in the United States two organizations offering these services include Catalog Choice and DMAChoice. A similar organization by the name of 41pounds.org received customer complaints and then became defunct. Another one by the name of Tonic Mailstopper (formerly GreenDimes) no longer appears to be in business either.

Several websites critical of junk mail have guides for people interested in reducing the amount of junk mail they get, such as the Center for a New American Dream.

In response to a US Supreme Court ruling (Rowan v. Post Office Dept., 397 U.S. 728 (1970)), the United States Postal Service enables an applicant to obtain a Prohibitory Order, which gives people the power to stop non-governmental organizations from sending them mail, and to demand such organizations remove the consumers’ information from their mailing lists.

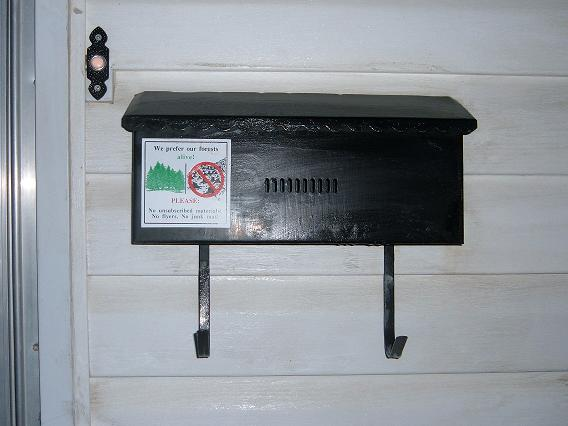
A "No Junkmail" sticker on a mailbox in Calgary, Canada

In Canada, the highly publicized Red Dot Campaign offers advice on reducing unaddressed advertising mail. The campaign focuses on advertising the Canada Post policy to respect "No Junkmail" signs, noting that this policy is not promoted by Canada Post itself. The name "red dot" refers to an internal marker used by Canada Post to indicate which households do not wish to receive unaddressed admail.

The UK Royal Mail also offers an opt-out service, though unaddressed government mailings cannot be separated from advertisements, and those who opted out of the latter would stop receiving the former as well.

== Criticism ==
=== Environmental effect ===
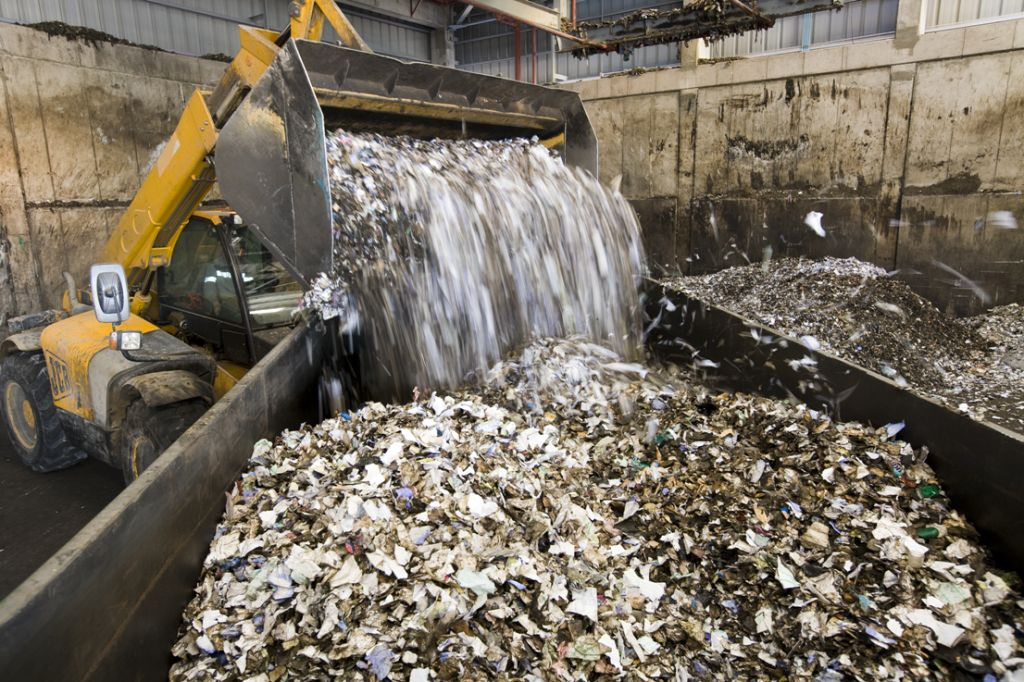
Solid waste after being shredded to a uniform size

Several environmental groups express concern about the environmental impact generated by direct mail.

In the US, the Environmental Protection Agency estimates that 44% of junk mail is discarded without being opened or read, equalling four million tons of waste paper per year, with 32% recovered for recycling. Further, the Ohio Office of Compliance Assistance and Pollution Prevention (OCAPP) estimates that 250,000 homes could be heated for a single day's junk mail (70,000,000,000,000/3 btus of energy or 28,870,000,000/21 kWh of energy).

In the UK, the Minister of State responsible for the Department for Environment, Food and Rural Affairs estimated that "direct mail and promotions" accounted for between 500,000 and 600,000 tonnes of paper in 2002, with 13% being recycled. The government and the Direct Marketing Association (UK) together agreed on recycling targets for the direct mail industry, including a goal of 55% by 2009, though the DMA's latest estimates are that the industry will fall well short of this mark.

Mike Berners-Lee estimates that receiving five letters per day plus two printed catalogs per week results in 480 kilograms (1,060 lb) CO_{2e} per year.

A New York Times article from 2009 states that in the United States 51.5 million metric tons of greenhouse gases are emitted each year from mail advertisements. The Environmental Protection Agency indicates that in 2009 total US greenhouse gas emissions were 6,700.10 million metric tons.

=== Privacy issues ===
Recipients may conceive of advertising mail as a privacy problem, both because its generation requires extensive collection and use of information, and because receipt of mail can be an intrusion into the home. Numerous public opinion polls have found that Americans find advertising mail intrusive, for instance, in June 2003, the Pew Internet & American Life Project found that 19 percent of Americans found, "junk mail delivered by the postal service" a very big intrusion and 33 percent found it to be a big intrusion. Researchers at the University of California recently found that four out of five Americans favor a do-not-mail law, similar to the existing do-not-call telemarketing registry.

=== Attention ===
Advertising mail has been criticized as a form of attention theft.

== See also ==
- Direct marketing
  - Direct mail fundraising
  - Direct response marketing
  - Direct Marketing Associations
