= N400 =

N400 or N-400 may refer to:

- N400 (neuroscience), an event-related potential component elicited by meaningful stimuli (words, pictures, etc.)
- N-400 road (Spain), a highway connecting Toledo to Cuenca
- Honda N400, a car similar to the Honda N360
- Samsung N400, a mobile phone by Samsung
- Form N-400, United States Citizenship and Immigration Services application for naturalization
- A variant of the Aston Martin V8 Vantage car
- Chevrolet N400, branding of the Wuling Hongguang V in Latin American markets
