= U.S. Automotive Protection Services =

US extended warranty company

U.S. Automotive Protection Services LLC (USAPS) is an extended warranty company for vehicles based in Wentzville, Missouri. They have been known to send direct mail marketing letters and phone calls, implying a pre-existing relationship with the consumer to lend legitimacy to their company.

In 2022 USAPS settled a consent judgment with the Wisconsin Department of Justice to identify their company in letters and not use misleading phrases such as "official business", "final notice", or "customer account #", and to pay $75,000 in penalties.

The Colorado Attorney General sent a subpoena to the company in March 2025 and was still attempting to contact the company in June 2026 for violating the state's consumer protection statutes.
