= Cissna =

Cissna is a surname. Notable people with the surname include:

- L. Francis Cissna (born 1966), American lawyer and government official
- Sharon Cissna (born 1942), American politician

== See also ==
- Cissna Park, Illinois
