= Olick =

Olick is a surname. Notable people with the surname include:

- Jeffrey K. Olick (born 1964), American sociologist
- Karen Olick, American political strategist
