= Campaign manager =

Administrator for a political candidate's campaign

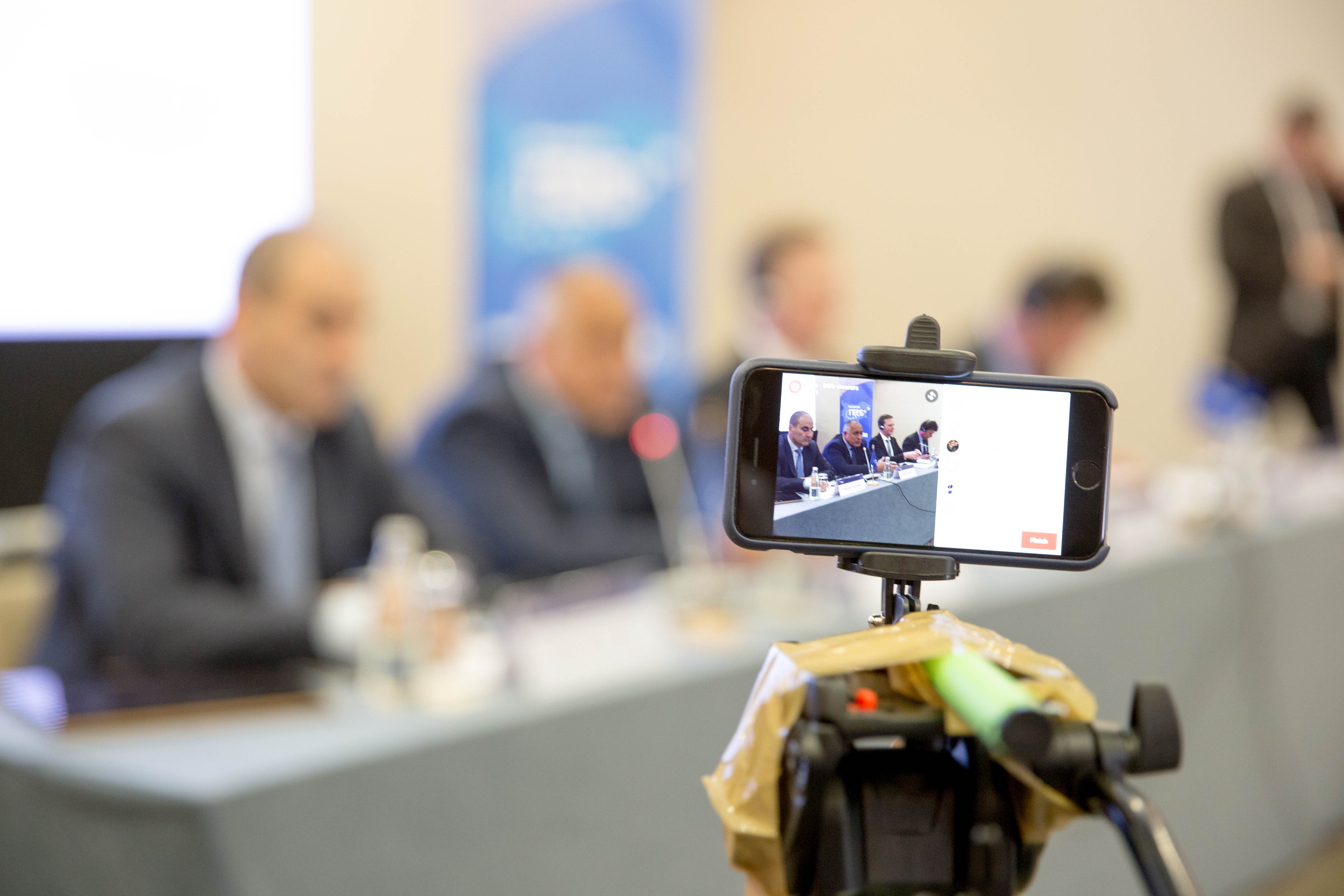
Campaign Managers' Meeting, 25-26 April 2016, Sofia, Bulgaria

A campaign manager, campaign chairperson, or campaign director is an individual whose role is to coordinate a political campaign's spending, broad tactics, and hiring. They lead operations such as fundraising, advertising, polling, getting out the vote (with direct contact to the public), and other activities supporting the effort, directly.

Apart from the candidate, they are often a campaign's most visible leader. However, modern campaign managers, particularly at the presidential level, are mostly concerned with executing strategy, not setting it. The senior strategists are typically outside political consultants, primarily pollsters and media consultants.

Particularly for large, well-funded campaigns, campaign managers often manage a huge number of staffers and volunteers in a variety of departments; while also coordinating closely with the candidate and outside consultants.

In the United States, increasingly, campaign management has been a speciality occupation. The top-tier of managers will move throughout the country working on a different campaign each election cycle. The challenges of building a successful operation from scratch in less than 2 years makes experienced professionals increasingly valuable.

In addition to their past experience, experienced campaign managers also bring with them knowledge of campaign management tools and relationships with political consultants.

The pay ranges for a campaign manager differ depending on the scale of the political race.

== History ==
The role of campaign manager evolved significantly over time. In the early American republic, open campaigning was considered undignified, but candidates still relied on surrogates to advance their political interests. One of the earliest and most notable examples was John Beckley, the first clerk of the United States House of Representatives, who managed efforts on behalf of Thomas Jefferson during the 1796 and 1800 presidential campaigns. Beckley's activities included publishing anti-Federalist and pro-Jefferson literature, as well as collecting intelligence on Jefferson's political rivals.

The modern concept of the campaign manager began to take shape in the late 19th century. During Grover Cleveland's 1892 presidential campaign, his managers organized a public notification ceremony at Madison Square Garden in New York, departing from the tradition of private notification ceremonies held in the nominee's home. The role became more firmly established during the 1896 presidential election, when Mark Hanna, a businessman and friend of Republican candidate William McKinley, left his business interests to serve as McKinley's national campaign manager. Hanna developed a strategy that included formalizing relationships between the political party and corporate contributors, positioning the president as party leader, and organizing an elaborate campaign staff devoted to distributing campaign materials to the widest possible audience.
