= Jennifer B. Higgins =

American government official

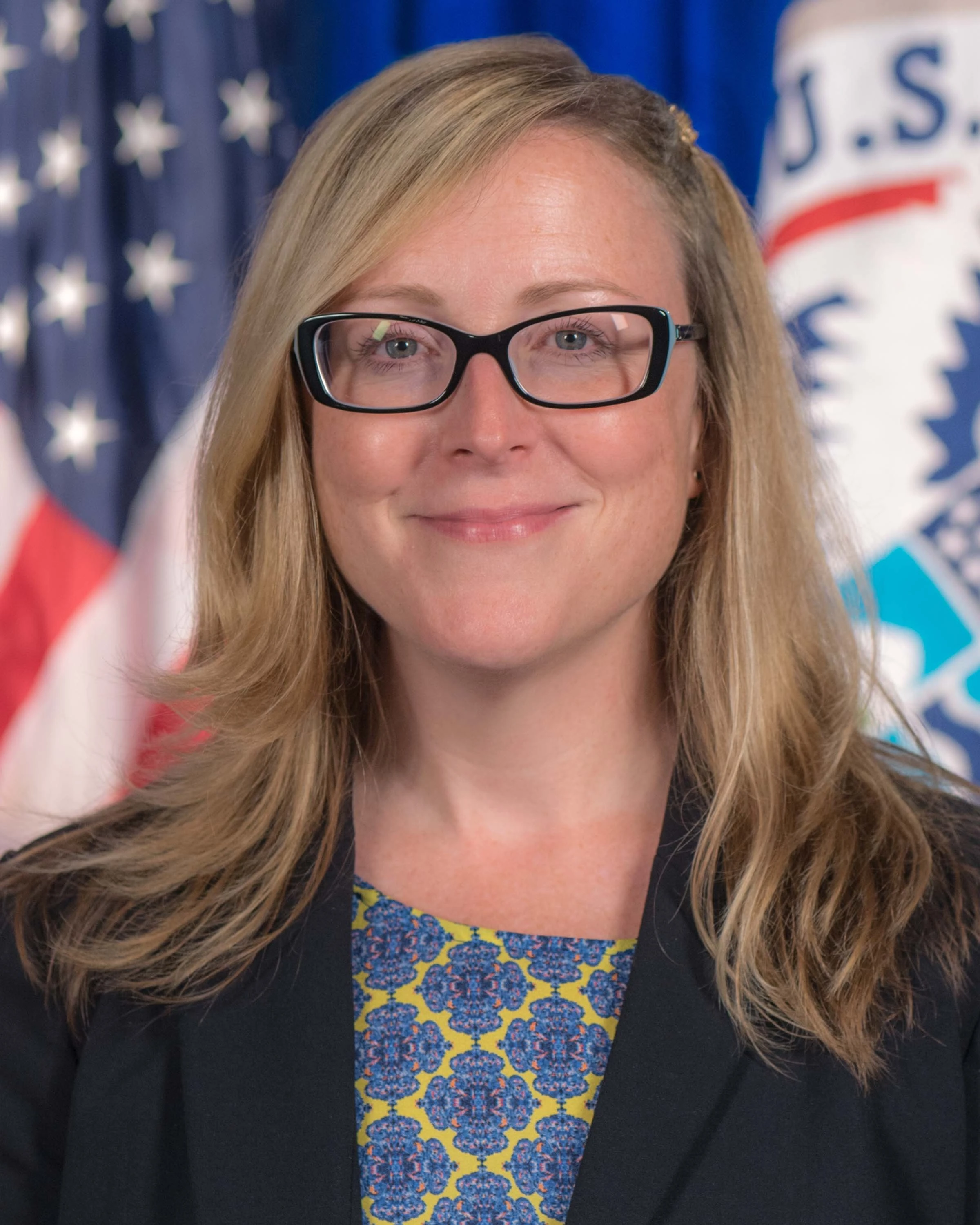

Director of the United States Citizenship and Immigration Services
- Acting; January 20, 2025 – February 9, 2025
- President: Donald Trump
- Preceded by: Ur Jaddou
- Succeeded by: Kika Scott (acting)

Personal details
- Education: American University

Jennifer B. Higgins is an American government executive who served as the acting director of U.S. Citizenship and Immigration Services (USCIS) and its deputy director since 2022. She was previously the acting chief of staff to the U.S. Secretary of Homeland Security from 2021 to 2022.

== Education ==
Higgins earned a master's degree in comparative politics from American University.

== Career ==
Higgins began her federal career in 1999 as a Presidential Management Fellow with the Immigration and Naturalization Service's Office of International Affairs. Upon completion of her fellowship in 2001, she joined the Refugee Affairs Division as an immigration officer. From 2007 to 2016, Higgins held leadership positions within the Refugee, Asylum, and International Operations Directorate (RAIO) at United States Citizenship and Immigration Services (USCIS), as the branch chief for asylum operations. In 2014, she was promoted to the Senior Executive Service (SES), becoming deputy chief for the Refugee Affairs Division. She also served as a senior advisor to the USCIS director on immigration reform in 2015.

Higgins was chief of staff to the U.S. Deputy Secretary of Homeland Security from 2016 to 2017. From January 2017 to 2021, she was the associate director for the Refugee, Asylum, and International Operations Directorate (RAIO) at U.S. Citizenship and Immigration Services (USCIS). In September 2021, she became the acting chief of staff to the U.S. Secretary of Homeland Security, succeeding Karen Olick.

On January 31, 2022, Higgins became deputy director of USCIS. On January 20, 2025, she was appointed as the acting director of USCIS. Higgins was succeeded as deputy director by Andrew Davidson on February 9, 2025. On February 9, 2025, Higgins was succeeded as acting director of USCIS by Kika Scott.

Political offices
Preceded by Ur Jaddou	Director of the United States Citizenship and Immigration Services; Acting; 2025	Succeeded by Kika Scott; Acting
