= Monis v The Queen =

Judgement of the High Court of Australia

- Court: High Court of Australia
- Full case name: Monis v The Queen; Droudis v The Queen
- Decided: 27 February 2013
- Citations: [2013] HCA 4, (2013) 249 CLR 92

Case history
- Prior actions: R v Monis [2011] NSWDC 39; Monis v R [2011] NSWCCA 231, (2011) 215 A Crim R 64

Court membership
- Judges sitting: French CJ, Hayne, Heydon, Crennan, Kiefel and Bell JJ

Case opinions
- (6:0) The law in question effectively burdened political communication, satisfying the first part of the Lange test. (per French CJ, Hayne, Heydon, Crennan, Kiefel and Bell JJ) (3:3) The law was reasonably and appropriately adapted to achieving the legitimate object of protecting people from intrusive, seriously offensive communications. The second limb of the Lange test was satisfied, so it did not offend the implied freedom of political communication. (per Crennan, Kiefel and Bell JJ) (6:0) For a communication to be considered offensive for the purposes of the law in question, it must be "in the higher ranges of seriousness". (per French CJ, Hayne, Heydon, Crennan, Kiefel and Bell JJ)

Monis v The Queen is a 2013 High Court of Australia case that dealt with the implied freedom of political communication in relation to whether or not the government may criminalise sending offensive messages through the postal system.

== Background ==
Man Haron Monis was alleged to have sent letters (and in one case, a recording on a CD) to parents, spouses and other relatives of Australian soldiers killed while on active service in Afghanistan (and in one case, to the mother of an Austrade official killed in a bombing in Indonesia). The letters contained expressions of sympathy to the relatives of the deceased, but also contained criticisms of the deceased: assertions that they were murderers of innocent civilians, comparisons of the body of one deceased soldier to the “dirty body of a pig”, and comparisons to Adolf Hitler. Copies of the letters were also sent to Australian politicians.

Section 471.12 of the Code makes it an offence for a person to use a postal or similar service "in a way ... that reasonable persons would regard as being, in all the circumstances... offensive".

Monis was charged with 12 counts under s 471.12 of the Commonwealth Criminal Code. In addition, Amirah Droudis was charged with eight counts of aiding and abetting Monis in the commission of those offences.

Mr Monis and Ms Droudis claimed that s 417.12 violated the implied constitutional freedom of political communication. The New South Wales Court of Criminal Appeal rejected this argument and found the section was valid. The case was appealed to the High Court.

== The case ==
Monis v The Queen was a case heard in the High Court of Australia by Chief Justice Robert French, and Justices Kenneth Hayne, Dyson Heydon, Susan Crennan, Susan Kiefel and Virginia Bell.

== The decision ==
On appeal, the High Court divided evenly on the question (3–3). As a result, the decision of the Court of Appeal was affirmed.

The Court was not obliged to determine whether the communications in the present case were "offensive" for the purposes of s 417.12. The sole question before the Court was whether s 417.12 infringed the implied freedom and was so invalid.

The Court reiterated that the implied freedom of political communication does not operate as an individual right; rather, it is an implied restriction on the legislative competence of Australian parliaments and executives.

In determining whether s 417.12 infringed the implied freedom, the Court applied the test expounded in Lange v Australian Broadcasting Corporation, as modified in Coleman v Power.

There are two limbs to that test:

1. Does the law effectively burden freedom of communication about government or political matters?
2. If so:
  1. does the law have an object that is compatible with the maintenance of the constitutionally prescribed system of representative and responsible government? and
  2. is the law reasonably appropriate and adapted to achieving that legitimate object or end?

All members of the Court construed the word "offensive" in s 417.12 narrowly. They found the true operation of the provision is only to make illegal use of postal services that are "very", "seriously" or "significantly" offensive, or that are "calculated or likely to arouse significant anger, significant outrage, disgust or hatred in the mind of a reasonable person in all the circumstances." There were a number of reasons for adopting this interpretation including: the provision is a criminal provision, and carries a significant penalty; the provision restricts a common law freedom; the prohibition on “offensive” uses of postal services sits together with prohibitions on “menacing” and “harassing” uses, suggesting the provision intends to target more serious conduct; and legislation should be interpreted, if possible, so as to avoid constitutional invalidity.

Despite this narrow construction, all members of the Court found that s 417.12 does effectively burden freedom of communication about government or political matters. That is because even construed narrowly, the provision would criminalise some political communications. The first limb of the Lange test was therefore satisfied.

Crennan, Kiefel, and Bell JJ held that the purpose of the law was to protect people from “intrusive”, seriously offensive communications. The nature of postal communications is that they are delivered into people's private homes and workplaces. Seriously offensive communications are likely to be unsolicited.

They held that this purpose is compatible with the maintenance of the constitutionally prescribed system of government. Further, the law is reasonably and appropriately adapted to achieving that legitimate purpose. The freedom of political communication is not absolute. Section 417.12 is not directed at political communications – it only incidentally affects them. It is unlikely to impose an extensive burden them. The law is therefore valid.

In contrast, French CJ (with whom Heydon J agreed) and Hayne J held that the purpose of s 417.12 is simply to prevent the use of postal services in an offensive way. For slightly different reasons, they held that this is not a legitimate purpose with respect to the Lange test. Notably, they both appeared to consider that the restrictions imposed on political communications were greater than did Crennan, Kiefel, and Bell JJ. Both French CJ and Hayne J attached a greater degree of importance to the role that offensive communications play in political discourse.

French CJ, Hayne, and Heydon JJ also held that s 417.12 is invalid as it should not be read down to avoid infringement of the implied freedom.

== See also ==
- Rowan v. United States Post Office Department

== Footnotes ==
This article contains content derived from the "Casenote: Monis v The Queen [2013] HCA 4", Australian Human Rights Commission 2013, which is licensed under the Creative Commons Attribution 4.0 International License.
