= León Rodríguez =

American lawyer and government official (born 1962)

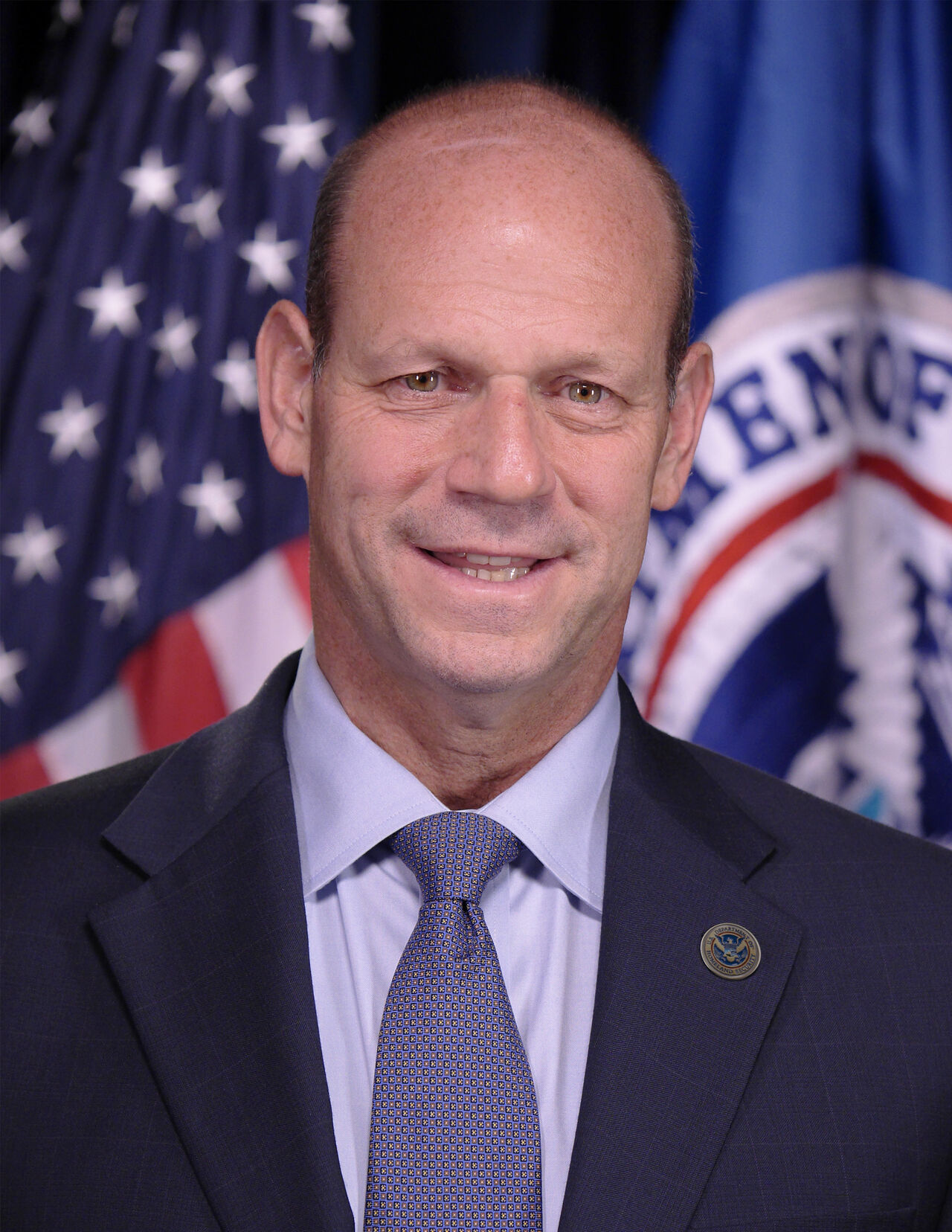
- Official portrait, 2014

4th Director of United States Citizenship and Immigration Services
- In office July 9, 2014 – January 20, 2017
- President: Barack Obama
- Preceded by: Alejandro Mayorkas
- Succeeded by: L. Francis Cissna

Director of the U.S. Department of Health and Human Services Office for Civil Rights
- In office 2011–2014
- President: Barack Obama
- Preceded by: Georgina Verdugo
- Succeeded by: Jocelyn Samuels

Personal details
- Born: 1962 (age 62–63); Brooklyn, New York, U.S.
- Political party: Democratic
- Spouse: Jill Schwartz
- Children: 2
- Education: Brown University (BA); Boston College (JD)
- Occupation: Lawyer

León Rodríguez (born 1962) is an American lawyer who headed United States Citizenship and Immigration Services under President Barack Obama. He previously served as director the Office for Civil Rights of the United States Department of Health and Human Services, as chief of staff and deputy assistant attorney general for the United States Department of Justice Civil Rights Division, and as the county attorney of Montgomery County, Maryland.

== Early life and family ==
=== Childhood and education ===
Rodríguez was born in 1962 in Brooklyn, New York City, to a Jewish Cuban family. His parents, Isaac and Sarah (Policar) Rodríguez, had grown up in Havana and fled to the United States the previous year, during the first wave of the Cuban exodus. Rodríguez's grandparents were Jews from Turkey and Poland; his paternal grandfather and namesake, born "Leon Rodrik," immigrated to Cuba from Turkey in the 1920s.

Rodríguez grew up speaking Spanish at home. When he was four years old, his parents moved the family from New York to Miami Beach, Florida, and he attended local public schools, including Miami Beach Senior High School. He later graduated from Brown University and the law school of Boston College.

=== Marriage ===
Shortly after graduating from law school, Rodríguez married Jill Schwartz, an obstetrician. The couple went on to have two children: a daughter and a son.

== Career ==
Rodríguez began his career as a prosecutor in the Kings County District Attorney's Office. He went on to serve as a trial attorney with the United States Department of Justice Civil Rights Division and in the United States Attorney's Office for the Western District of Pennsylvania, before moving to the Washington, D.C. area to enter private practive. In 2007, he was appointed as county attorney of Montgomery County, Maryland.

After rejoining the Department of Justice's Civil Rights Division for a brief tenure as chief of staff and deputy assistant attorney general, he was appointed director the Office for Civil Rights of the United States Department of Health and Human Services under Secretary Kathleen Sebelius in 2011. In 2014, Barack Obama nominated him to serve as the director of United States Citizenship and Immigration Services.

Political offices
Preceded by Georgina Verdugo	Director of the United States Department of Health and Human Services Office for Civil Rights; 2011–2014	Succeeded by Jocelyn Samuels
Preceded by Alejandro Mayorkas	Director of United States Citizenship and Immigration Services; 2014–2017	Succeeded by L. Francis Cissna
