= Political campaign staff =

People who formulate and implement the strategy needed to win an election

Political campaign staff are the group of people who formulate and implement the strategy of a political campaign. Campaign staffs are generally composed both of unpaid volunteers and paid employees of either the campaign itself or a related political party. The staff may include political consultants who provide advice and assistance to a campaign.

== Structure of a campaign ==
Campaigns are generally run by a campaign manager who coordinates the campaign and assures that efforts are being focused effectively. In small local campaigns, the campaign manager will often be the only paid staff member and will be responsible for every aspect of the campaign that is not covered by the candidate or volunteers. In larger campaigns, such as a United States presidential campaign, hundreds of staff members will cover the required tasks. While campaign managers are often the lead strategists in local campaigns, in the United States larger campaigns hire consultants to serve as strategists and the campaign manager focuses mostly on coordinating the campaign staff. Campaign managers will often have deputies who oversee various aspects of the campaign at a closer level.

Directly below the campaign manager on the organization chart is the deputy campaign manager and directly below them are department directors who coordinate specific aspects of the campaign. These staff members often have deputies as well.

In some campaigns, an executive chairman of the campaign committee will be appointed. The responsibility of an executive chairman will vary widely by campaign, usually an executive chairman is a consultant on internal matters such as campaign staff appointments and major internal policy.

Below the department level, campaigns vary widely in their structure. On larger campaigns, there will be various coordinators for certain functions within each department. For example, within the fundraising department, there might be a staff member who focuses only on direct mail fundraising.

The foundation of the campaign structure are the interns and volunteers. Their tasks can include addressing envelopes, entering data into databases, and canvassing voters on behalf of the campaign.

== Departments and their respective purposes ==
=== Operations department ===
- Chief Operating Officer or Operations Director
  - Human Resources
  - IT & Cybersecurity
  - Financial Operations
  - Field Operations

Larger statewide and national campaigns will have operations departments, which is responsible for the internal functions that power a campaign as an organization. While structure varies, the operations department will generally take on human resources and people operations responsibilities, including running payroll; IT and cybersecurity operations, which secure the campaign's electronic systems and ensure their availability for use; financial operations which will track the budget against actual spending and raising; and field operations, which handles the logistics of a larger field program. On some campaigns, including smaller campaigns, these functions are sometimes outsourced to outside vendors to keep overhead low.

=== Field department ===
The field department focuses on the "on-the-ground" organizing that is required in order to personally contact voters through canvassing, phone calls, and building local events. Voter contact helps construct and clean the campaign's voter file in order to help better target voter persuasion and identify which voters a campaign most wants to bring out on election day. Field is generally also tasked with running local "storefront" campaign offices as well as organizing phone banks and staging locations for canvasses and other campaign events.

On the statewide level, field departments are generally organized by geography with an overall statewide field director who oversees the efforts of several regional field directors who in turn manage several local offices.

- State Chairperson
- State Finance Chairperson
- Congressional District Chairperson
- County Chairperson
- State Director
  - State Deputy Director for Volunteer Operations (Grassroots)
    - County Coordinator
      - Precinct Captain
    - Coalitions Coordinator
  - State Deputy Director for Administration
    - Scheduling and Advance Coordinator
- State Policy Director
  - Legislative Advisor
- State Communications Director

Other field workers below this level include:

- Volunteer Coordinator: tasked full-time with recruiting, retaining, and scheduling volunteers
- Field Organizer: the lowest level of field staff, these paid workers generally do direct voter contact full-time as well as assisting the Deputy Director
- GOTV ("Get out the vote") coordinator: generally either brought in within the last few months of the campaign or a re-tasked staffer, GOTV coordinators plan the local GOTV efforts.

In addition to voter persuasion and voter identification, field staff will often provide information for the campaign headquarters as to what is going on in the communities they work in. Field staffers are the primary liaison between the campaign and local influentials such as interest group leaders and prominent community activists. Field departments are also often primarily responsible for the local distribution of "swag" i.e. lawn signs, bumper stickers, buttons, and other such materials.

=== Communications department ===
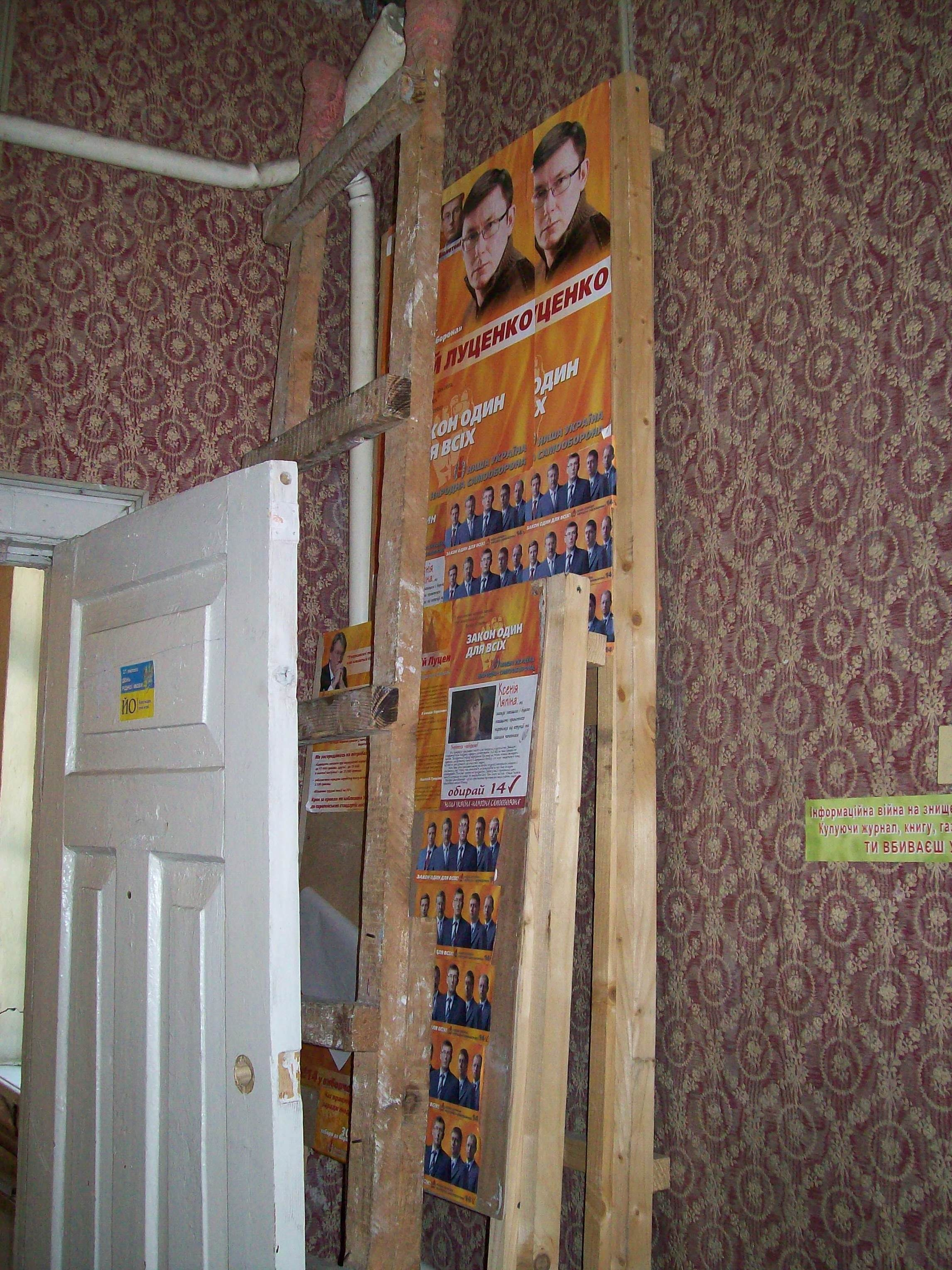
Our Ukraine–People's Self-Defense Bloc campaign material in Ukraine, August 2007

The communications department oversees both the press relations and advertising involved in promoting the campaign in the media. They are responsible for the campaign's message and image among the electorate. Press releases, advertisements, phone scripts, and other forms of communication must be approved by this department before they can be released to the public. The staffers within this office vary widely from campaign to campaign. However, they generally include:

- A communications director who oversees the entirety of the campaign's messaging, message planning, media relations, and the whole communications staff.
- A press secretary who monitors the media and coordinates the campaign's relations with the press. Press secretaries set up interviews between the candidate and reporters, brief the press at press conferences, and perform other tasks involved in press relations.
- A rapid response director who makes sure that the campaign responds quickly to the attacks of the other campaigns. They and their staff constantly monitor the media and the moves of their opponents, making sure that attacks are rebutted quickly.
- Creative team managing all visual communications and ensuring consistency of campaign materials/merchandise (both print and digital) through web design, graphic design, advertising, promotional items. Often these staffers work closely with the IT department.

=== Political department ===
- Activists, Grassroots, and Volunteers
- Outreach
- Education

Researching and developing a set of policies requires a large team to research and write each plank. Researchers also provide information to the campaign on issues and the backgrounds of candidates (including the candidate they work for) in order to be aware of skeletons in the various candidates' closets. The latter practice is known as opposition research. On smaller campaigns this is often folded into the communications department.

=== Fundraising (Finance) department ===
The finance department coordinates the campaign's fundraising operation and ensures that the campaign always has the money it needs to operate effectively. The techniques employed by this campaign vary based on the campaign's needs and size. Small campaigns often involve casual fundraising events and phone calls from the candidate to donors asking for money. Larger campaigns will include everything from high-priced sit-down dinners to e-mail messages to donors asking for money.

=== Legal department ===
The legal department makes sure that the campaign is in compliance with the law and files the appropriate forms with government authorities. In Britain and other Commonwealth countries, such as Canada and India, each campaign must have an official agent, who is legally responsible for the campaign and is obligated to make sure the campaign follows all rules and regulations.

This department will also be responsible for tracking all financial transactions, including bank reconciliations, loans and backup for in-kind donations. They are generally required to keep both paper and electronic files. Small campaigns will often have one person responsible for financial disclosure while larger campaigns will have dozens of lawyers and treasurers making sure that the campaign's activities are legal. After the election, the compliance and legal department must still respond to audit requests and, when required, debt retirement.

=== Technology department ===
- Chief Information Technology Officer
  - Office of New Media
  - Office of Applications and Networks
  - Office of Data and Strategy

The technology department designs and maintains campaign technology such as voter file, websites, and social media. While local (county, city, town, or village) campaigns might have volunteers who know how to use computers, state and national campaigns will have information technology professionals across the state or country handling everything from websites to blogs to databases.

=== Scheduling and advance department ===
The scheduling and advance department makes sure that the candidate and campaign surrogates are effectively scheduled so as to maximize their influence on voters. This department also oversees the advance people who arrive at events before the candidate to make sure everything is in order. Often, this department will be a part of the field department.

On small campaigns the scheduling coordinator may be responsible for developing and executing events. The scheduling coordinator typically manages the candidate's personal and campaign schedule, field and advance team schedules, and gathers important information about all events the campaign and candidate will attend.
