= Ur Jaddou =

American attorney (born 1974)

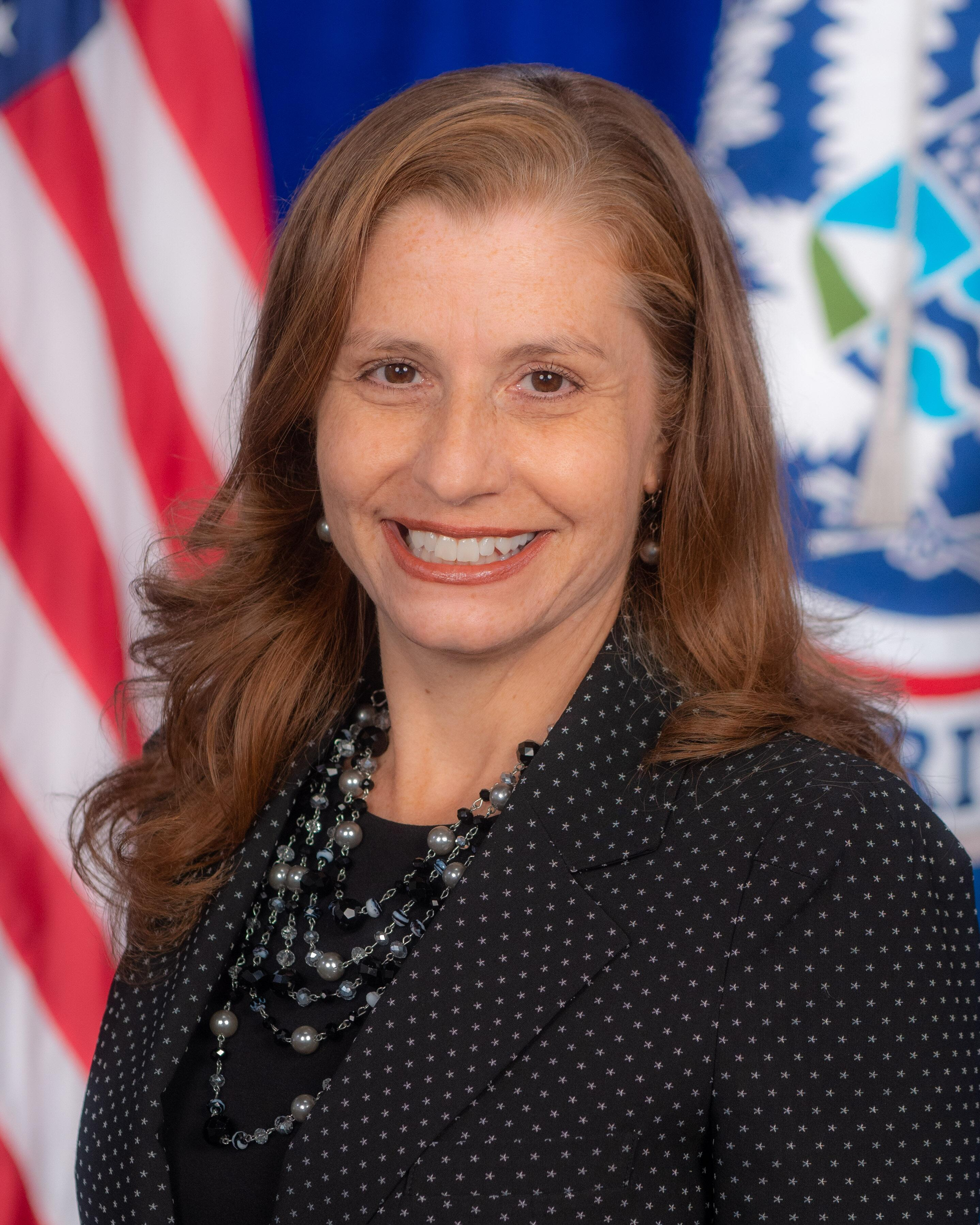

6th Director of the United States Citizenship and Immigration Services
- In office August 3, 2021 – January 20, 2025
- President: Joe Biden
- Preceded by: L. Francis Cissna
- Succeeded by: Joseph Edlow

Personal details
- Born: 1974 (age 51–52) Chula Vista, California, U.S.
- Party: Independent
- Education: Stanford University (BA, MA); University of California, Los Angeles (JD)

Ur Mendoza Jaddou (born 1974) is an American attorney who served as the director of the United States Citizenship and Immigration Services in the Department of Homeland Security from 2021 to 2025.

== Early life and education ==
Jaddou was born and raised in Chula Vista, California. Her mother is from Mexico and her father is from Iraq, of Assyrian descent. Jaddou earned a Bachelor of Arts and Master of Arts in philosophy from Stanford University and a Juris Doctor from the UCLA School of Law.

== Career ==
From 2002 to 2007, Jaddou was senior counsel to Congresswoman Zoe Lofgren. From 2007 to 2011, she was majority chief counsel to the United States House Judiciary Subcommittee on Immigration and Citizenship. From 2012 to 2014, she was deputy assistant secretary of the Bureau of Legislative Affairs for regional, global, and functional affairs. Jaddou then joined the United States Department of Homeland Security, serving as chief counsel for Citizenship and Immigration Services. Since 2017, Jaddou has also been an adjunct law professor at the Washington College of Law. From 2018 to 2021, Jaddou was the director of DHS Watch, a watchdog group operated by America's Voice.

=== Nomination as director of USCIS ===
On April 12, 2021, President Joe Biden announced his intent to nominate Jaddou to be the director of the United States Citizenship and Immigration Services. On April 15, 2021, her nomination was sent to the Senate. The Senate confirmed her on July 30, 2021 by a 47–34 vote.

=== Director of USCIS ===
Jaddou was sworn in as Director of the United States Citizenship and Immigration Services on August 3, 2021. Under Jaddou, USCIS changed its mission statement in February 2022 to include words like "welcome" and "respect" for immigrants, after the Trump administration moved to emphasize that the agency's work included "securing the homeland." The Trump administration also had removed the phrase, "nation of immigrants," from the agency's mission statement, prompting backlash from immigrant rights groups, but Jaddou did not restore the phrase.

Jaddou has called for USCIS to hire thousands of additional staff to address record case backlogs. She testified in Congress in April 2022 that the agency was still dealing with vacancies and morale problems experienced during the Trump administration.

Political offices
Preceded by Tracy Renaud; Acting	Director of the United States Citizenship and Immigration Services; 2021–2025	Succeeded by Jennifer B. Higgins; Acting
