= Joseph Edlow =

American lawyer (born 1981)

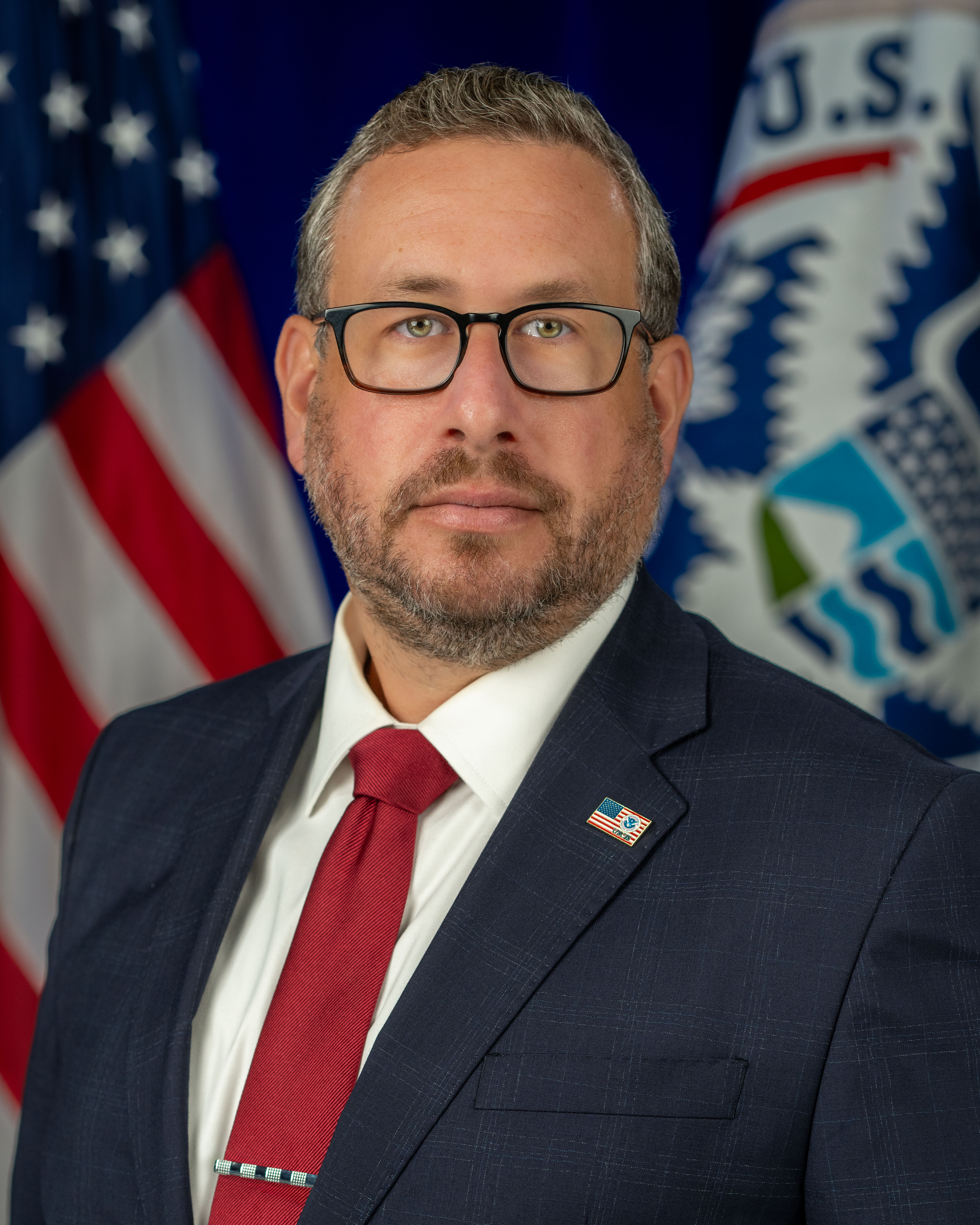

7th Director of the United States Citizenship and Immigration Services
- Incumbent
- Assumed office July 18, 2025
- President: Donald Trump
- Preceded by: Ur Jaddou
- Acting; February 20, 2020 – January 20, 2021
- President: Donald Trump
- Preceded by: Mark Koumans (acting)
- Succeeded by: Tracy Renaud (acting)

Personal details
- Born: Joseph Benjamin Edlow; May 31, 1981 (age 44) Baltimore, Maryland, U.S.
- Party: Independent
- Education: Brandeis University (BA); Case Western Reserve University (JD)

Joseph Benjamin Edlow (born May 31, 1981) is an American lawyer who has served as the director of the United States Citizenship and Immigration Services (USCIS) since 2025.

== Early life and education ==
Edlow was born on May 31, 1981, in Baltimore, Maryland, to a Jewish family. He graduated from Brandeis University with a Bachelor of Arts in political science, government, and history in 2003, then earned a Juris Doctor (J.D.) from the Case Western Reserve University School of Law in 2006.

== Career ==
After graduating from law school, Edlow became the political director for Scott Rolle's unsuccessful campaign to be the attorney general of Maryland. From 2006 to 2007, he worked as an associate attorney in private practice, then was an assistant chief counsel for the United States Immigration and Customs Enforcement (ICE) from 2008 to 2015.

From 2015 to 2017, Edlow was legal counsel to Representative Raúl Labrador (R-ID) and then counsel to the United States House Committee on the Judiciary from 2017 to 2018. From 2018 to 2019, he was deputy assistant attorney general at the Office of Legal Policy of the U.S. Department of Justice.

Edlow was chief counsel of United States Citizenship and Immigration Services (USCIS) from 2019 to 2020 and deputy director for policy at USCIS from 2020 to 2021, he was also acting director of the agency during this period. Beginning in 2022, he was also a visiting fellow at the Heritage Foundation's Border Security and Immigration Center.

=== Nomination to be USCIS director ===
On March 10, 2025, President Donald Trump nominated Edlow to be Director of the United States Citizenship and Immigration Services. His nomination hearing took place on May 21, 2025, with Chuck Grassley, chair of the Senate Judiciary Committee, presiding. On June 12, 2025, the Senate Judiciary Committee advanced Edlow's nomination to the U.S. Senate with a party-line vote.

Edlow's nomination was approved by the full U.S. Senate on July 15, 2025, by a vote of 52 yeas to 47 nays. He was sworn into office on July 18.

Political offices
Preceded by Mark Koumans; Acting	Director of the United States Citizenship and Immigration Services; Acting; 2020–2021	Succeeded by Tracy Renaud; Acting
Preceded by Angelica Alfonso-Royals; Acting	Director of the United States Citizenship and Immigration Services; 2025–present	Incumbent
