= Immigration Examinations Fee Account =

Account in the Treasury of the United States

The Immigration Examinations Fee Account (IEFA) is an account in the Treasury of the United States into which all revenues collected from fees for immigration and naturalization are deposited, and that is used to fund the costs associated with providing the immigration and naturalization benefits. The account funds most of the operations of the United States Citizenship and Immigration Services (USCIS), the sub-agency of the U.S. Department of Homeland Security that is tasked with most of the associated work (such as adjudication of USCIS immigration forms).

== Use in fee determination and relation with other laws ==
=== Some fees that are set by statute ===
While most USCIS fees for immigration and naturalization benefits are set by USCIS, some fees are explicitly set through legislation. The three main legislatively set fees are:

- The filing fee for temporary protected status (TPS) is set at $50 for initial filing, with renewals free of charge. USCIS does not have the authority to change these fees.
- Premium Processing Service fee was set originally by Congress at $1,000, but USCIS was allowed to make adjustments for inflation, which it did till the fee reached $1,440 in 2019. In 2020, an updated fee was authorized by the Emergency Stopgap USCIS Stabilization Act: $1,500 for H-2B and R categories, $2,500 for all others.
- CNMI education funding fee of $200. DHS has the authority to adjust this fee starting in 2020.

=== General fee determination ===
The concept of the Immigration Examinations Fee Account, and the authority of USCIS to set a fee schedule to make sure that the fees cover the costs of providing the associated services, and are consistent with other aspects of United States federal law and regulations around fee-setting; some of these other laws and used to inform the USCIS' process of setting and updating fees:

- The Independent Offices Appropriations Act of 1952, also known as the user fee statute, that provided federal agencies with the authority to assess user fees or charges through administrative regulations. The Act provides that charges for services or things of value should be fair and based on “(A) the costs to the Government; (B) the value of the service or thing to the recipient; (C) the public policy or interest served; and (D) other relevant facts.”
- The Chief Financial Officers Act of 1990: Subsection 205(a)(8) of the CFO Act requires each agency's Chief Financial Officer to “review, on a biennial basis, the fees, royalties, rents, and other charges imposed by the agency for services and things of value it provides, and make recommendations on revising those charges to reflect costs incurred by it in providing those services and things of value.”
- Office of Management and Budget (OMB) Circular No. A-25: Two key aspects of this are relevant: first, as a general policy, the user charge is to be assessed against each identifiable recipient for special benefits derived from Federal activities beyond those received by the general public. Second, the charge should be based on the "full cost" of the service that includes direct and indirect costs.

== History ==
The Departments of Commerce, Justice, and State, the Judiciary, and Related Agencies Appropriation Act, 1989, Pub. L. No. 100-459, Sec. 209, 102 Stat. 2186, 2203 (1988) authorized the Immigration and Naturalization Service (INS) to prescribe and collect fees to recover the cost of providing certain immigration and naturalization benefits. That law also authorized the establishment of the IEFA in the Treasury of the United States. All revenue from fees collected for immigration and naturalization benefits are deposited in the IEFA and remain available to provide immigration and naturalization benefits and the collection, safeguarding and accounting for fees. INS no longer exists, and its functions are split between the United States Citizenship and Immigration Services (USCIS), U.S. Immigration and Customs Enforcement (ICE), and U.S. Customs and Border Protection (CBP). The immigration and naturalization benefits described in the Act were at the time handled by the Adjudication & Naturalizations Program (ANP) of INS; USCIS is the successor organization for this program.

A later legislation, the Departments of Commerce, Justice, and State, the Judiciary, and Related Agencies Appropriations Act, 1991, Pub. L. No. 101-515, Sec. 210(d), 104 Stat. 2101, 2121 (1990), allowed for the fees to be set at a level to ensure recovery of all costs, not just the costs of processing the petition or application, but also costs of processing other petitions that may have no fee (such as asylum petitions) as well as administrative costs.

Another provision requires the Attorney General to prepare and submit annually to Congress statements of financial condition of the IEFA, including beginning account balance, revenues, withdrawals, and ending account balance and projections for the ensuing fiscal year.

IEFA fee reviews conducted biennially by USCIS have sometimes led to identification of various kinds of indirect costs that were not accounted for in previous fees, as well as cost increases due to increases in the cost of living, and these has been used as a basis for either fee increases or the charging of additional fees.
