= Johnson Box =

Box around the key message of a direct mail advertisement to draw the reader's attention

A Johnson Box is commonly found at the top of direct mail letters, containing the key message of the letter. Its purpose is to draw the reader's attention to this key message first, and hopefully grab their attention, enticing them to read the rest of the letter.

A Johnson Box is very effective, but it lends a "salesy" air to a letter, and so is considered inappropriate for letters that are intended to be formal or personal.

It has also been adapted to the email format, with the goal of ensuring the most attention grabbing content in the email is visible in the preview pane of an email reader.

The Johnson Box is named after direct marketer Frank Johnson, who is credited with using the Johnson Box to improve response to his offers for American Heritage magazine. He does not claim credit for creating the device, claiming to have only popularized it.

The Johnson Box has since "evolved" by use. It is often used in the middle of the page, particularly to highlight a testimony or an important sentence from the writing. It is now even used to surround an order form at the bottom right of the page which reiterates the benefit and offer.
