= Prescreen =

Prescreen is the process by which a lender proactively evaluates a consumer's credit history in order to decide whether or not to offer them credit. The process of prescreening consumers happens without the consumers' knowledge and without any derogatory effects on their credit file. The use of credit data for prescreen is strictly regulated in the United States by the Fair Credit Reporting Act (FCRA).

== History ==
The concept of prescreen was originally conceived as a new, more efficient method of account acquisition for financial institutions. Traditionally, financial services were provided by small community banks. These banks offered a specific set of credit products and services that met the needs of their community. When a potential customer would walk into their branch and apply for a credit product (like a credit card for example), the bank would evaluate the consumer's credit history and decide whether or not to approve the application.

However, as the financial industry consolidated in the latter half of the twentieth century, national financial institutions emerged, offering a comprehensive spectrum of credit products and services. This led to the creation of a national financial services marketplace in which new segments of profitable consumers across the country were up for grabs. Prescreen was developed to help banks efficiently tap this new, national pool of potential customers.

== How prescreen works ==
Instead of waiting for a customer to ask for a credit product, banks can proactively screen a huge batch of consumers for a credit product and send pre-approved offers to all who pass the bank's prescreen criteria. The emergence of national credit bureaus and automated credit decisioning software enabled this batch prescreen approach to be successfully implemented at financial institutions across the country.

== Direct mail prescreen ==
Today, batch prescreen is ubiquitous in the financial industry. The most common method for distributing batch prescreen offers is direct mail. During the first quarter of 2010, U.S consumers received 481 million direct mail prescreen credit offers which represents a 29 percent increase on the 372.4 million mailed in the first quarter of 2009. However, as the volume of direct mail prescreen offers increases, the acceptance rate of those offers tends to decrease. The reason for this inverse correlation is that the number of U.S consumers interested in responding to direct mail prescreen offers tends to remain relatively static. Direct mail prescreen, while compelling to some consumers, just doesn't appeal to everyone. Additionally, the printing and mailing of billions of direct mail pieces a year (most of which are immediately thrown away) contributes more than 4 million tons of paper to the nation's landfills each year.

== Instant prescreen ==
In response to the limited effectiveness of direct mail batch prescreen, financial institutions developed a new application for the concept of prescreen, instant prescreen, in 1992. The basic premise of instant prescreen is the same as direct mail prescreen: using credit data to evaluate a consumer for a credit product without that consumer's knowledge. However, the execution of instant prescreen is radically different than batch prescreen. With instant prescreen, financial institutions prescreen new or existing customers for additional credit products in real time at the point of contact. So instead of sending unsolicited prescreen offers to huge batches of unknown consumers, instant prescreen enables banks to offer known customers relevant credit products whenever those customers choose to contact the bank. This approach to prescreen focuses on deepening existing customer relationships and tends to produce higher acceptance rates than direct mail prescreen.
