= Direct mail fundraising =

Direct mail fundraising is a form of direct marketing widely used by nonprofit organizations in North America, Europe, and parts of Asia-Pacific to acquire new donors or members and retain the level of their contributions or dues as part of a fundraising program.

The professional use of direct mail fundraising requires an understanding both of the principles and practice of direct marketing and of the discipline of fundraising. In direct marketing, practitioners view large numbers of prospects or donors through the lens of statistics. Fundraising teaches us how to view prospects or donors as individuals, with unique values, beliefs, and preferences.

== History and growth in the United States ==
In its modern form, direct mail fundraising appeared in the United States after World War II, when nationwide charities such as the National Easter Seal Society sought ways to broaden their fundraising base.

It was only with the advent in the 1960s of the ZIP Code and, later, the computer that direct mail fundraising began to gain wide use. Before the ZIP Code, it was difficult to target appropriate recipients of direct mail fundraising appeals, and before the computer, compiling and maintaining lists of supporters was tedious and costly. During the 1970s, when computers became increasingly affordable, the use of direct mail fundraising spread widely. It quickly became the means by which most Americans learned about and first provided financial support for their charities of choice.

The explosive growth of the nonprofit sector in the United States — quadrupling in the 1980s and doubling again in the 1990s and early 2000s — led to a massive expansion in the use of direct mail to build and sustain large, nationwide donor and membership lists. Today, direct mail fundraising accounts for at least one-fifth of the more than $250 billion contributed annually in the U.S. to the nation's 1.6 million nonprofit organizations.

Direct mail fundraising has its own unique jargon, much of it related to the art and science of creating, producing and mailing the right appeal to the right list at the right time, and measuring the results.

In recent years, electronic communication media has been used more commonly among nonprofits. Online, email, and social media campaigns, collectively referred to as digital fundraising, have been used in coordination with direct mail fundraising. Nonprofits supplement direct mail campaigns with email blasts and social media posts, using similar messaging and visuals to tie the various communications together.

However, digital fundraising has not grown fast enough to replace direct mail for most nonprofits. In 2018, digital fundraising accounted for 8.5% percent of charitable donations in the United States.

== See also ==
- Direct mail
