= Karen Olick =

American political strategist

Karen Olick is an American political strategist who is a managing director at SKDK. She served as chief of staff to the U.S. Secretary of Homeland Security in 2021 and to U.S. senator Barbara Boxer from 1995 to 2006.

== Career ==
Olick worked for U.S. senator Barbara Boxer as her communications director from 1993 to 1995. From 1995 to March 2006, she was Boxer's chief of staff.

After leaving Boxer's office, Olick became the executive director of Americans United for Change (AUC). During her tenure, AUC campaigned against U.S. president George W. Bush's proposal to overhaul Social Security and supported the first 100-Hour Plan of the new U.S. House of RepresentativesDemocratic leadership.

In March 2007, Olick joined Squier Knapp Dunn (SKD), a Democratic media and communications firm. She was responsible for running SKD’s direct-mail business for the firm's Washington, D.C., clients and also worked as a general consultant and strategist. Olick remained with the firm, which later became SKDKnickerbocker, until January 2021, holding roles including managing director and president of brand and advocacy advertising.

In February 2021, Olick joined the U.S. Department of Homeland Security (DHS) as chief of staff to secretary Alejandro Mayorkas. In September 2021, she announced her resignation from the role. In October 2021, Olick rejoined SKDK as a managing director.
