= Extended warranty =

Product warranty offered in addition to a standard warranty

An extended warranty, sometimes called a service agreement, a service contract, or a maintenance agreement, is a prolonged warranty offered to consumers in addition to the standard warranty on new items. The extended warranty may be offered by the warranty administrator, the retailer or the manufacturer. Extended warranties cost extra and for a percentage of the item's retail price. Some extended warranties that are purchased for multiple years state in writing that during the first year, the consumer must still deal with the manufacturer in the occurrence of malfunction. Thus, what is often promoted as a five-year extended guarantee, for example, is actually only a four-year guarantee.

Extended warranties have terms and conditions which may not match the original terms and conditions. For example, these may not cover anything other than mechanical failure from normal usage. Exclusions may include commercial use, "acts of God", owner abuse, and malicious destruction. They may also exclude parts that normally wear out such as tires and lubrication on a vehicle.

These types of warranties are provided for various products, but automobiles and electronics are common examples. Warranties which are sold through retailers such as Best Buy may include significant commission for the retailer as a result of reverse competition. For instance, an auto warranty from a car dealership may be subcontracted and vehicle repairs may be at a lower rate which could compromise the quality of service. At the time of repair, out-of-pocket expenses may be charged for unexpected services provided outside of the warranty terms or uncovered parts.

== Overview ==
An extended warranty is coverage for electrical or mechanical breakdown. It may or may not cover peripheral items, wear and tear, damage by computer viruses, re-gassing, normal maintenance, accidental damage, or any consequential loss. Most state insurance regulators have approved the inclusion of normal wear and tear, accidental damage from handling, rental car and towing, power surge and other coverages in addition to the standard coverage for defects in materials and workmanship. The indemnity is to cover the cost of repair and may include replacement if deemed uneconomic to repair. It is important for consumers to read and understand the terms and conditions offered at the point of sale. In retail consumer electronics, extended warranties cost 20% to 30% of the price, and give sales associates up to 15% commission at some retailers.

Consumer advocate groups, such as the non-profit Consumers Union, advise against purchasing extended warranties unless they can be purchased at manufacturers cost. David Butler of the Consumers Union says, "The extended warranty is definitely in the best interest of the company because if the product breaks down they want you to be satisfied with it and buy another one when the time comes, but isn't often in the best interest of the consumer unless it can be purchased at cost with no or very little markup." Consumers Union said in 2006 that only two products deserved extended warranty consideration: projection TVs and digital cameras, as both are expensive to repair and require frequent repairs. In spite of such advice, consumers frequently purchase extended warranties because they overestimate the frequency of failure.

== Extended auto warranty ==
All new cars in the United States come with a warranty that cover repairs for a certain period of time and a certain number of miles, such as 3 years and 36,000 miles. An extended warranty provides similar coverage beyond those time or mileage limits. Legally, only the original manufacturer can "extend" a warranty. Other providers often use the term "extended warranty" to refer to similar products, although technically they should be considered Vehicle Service Contracts rather than "warranties."

According to the Automobile Protection Association (APA), which publishes the Lemon-Aid Car Buyer’s Guides, extended warranties or vehicle service contracts are a good idea if they cover items likely to break down within the coverage period. Extended auto warranties often offer other perks not included in a general factory warranty, such as trip interruption insurance and roadside assistance. Auto warranties generally do not cover vandalism or theft, dings or dents, road salt damage, environmental or natural disaster-related damage, car wash damage, or normal routine maintenance.

Most vehicle service contracts are sold at car dealerships at the time the vehicle is sold, although other providers offer them outside the dealership, often at lower prices.

== By region ==
=== Canadian province of Québec ===
Based upon the Québec civil code and the Loi sur la protection du consommateur every merchant is responsible to uphold the legal guarantee of a product. This legal guarantee protects the consumer from: purposefully hidden malfunctions, defaults that could not be readily identified at the moment of purchase, the guarantee that the item purchased can be used for its stated uses and finally guarantees a reasonable life expectancy based on the price paid. This guarantee survives even when the initial purchaser sells his goods to another person. A merchant cannot ask a consumer to pay any fees or shipping charges in order to be eligible to receive their legal guarantee. The office for the protection of consumers does not take a particular stance towards extended warranties. However, they recommend that consumers should be vigilant and question themselves whether the warranty really adds anything to the already applicable legal warranty. Finally they point out that the number of consumers who go to court against merchants in order for them to apply the legal warranty is almost proportional to the number of consumers who take legal means against a merchant for failing to respect extended warranties they have sold.

=== United States ===
In the United States, extended warranties are regulated by many state insurance commissioners as "service contracts." Service contracts can cover automobiles, consumer goods (such as appliances, electronics, lawn equipment, etc...) and homes. The regulatory structure requires licensure or registration of the warranty providers, financial solvency regulation, and service contract consumer disclosures. Service warranty "providers" apply for licensure or registration, and then may sell their products, usually at the point of sale of the product, for example at the car dealership, or at the retail consumer electronics store, but some companies such as After, Inc, SquareTrade, Warranty Direct and Motoreasy also sell directly to consumers. In the United States, a type of extended warranty called vehicle service contracts are typically regulated by the states as insurance. At one point, California issued a cease and desist letter to several corporations which were selling the insurance illegally in the state; the corporations contended that it was not insurance because the contracts required that certain additives be used.

The Service Contract Industry Council was founded by Fredrick D. Schaufeld and Bernie Schermer in 1988 and is a trade association of members of the industry.

=== United Kingdom ===
The extended warranty market has been subject to several investigations. In 2002 the Office of Fair Trading decided that self-regulation of the industry had failed and passed the case onto the Competition Commission. This concluded that the market was not acting in the interests of consumers. The Citizens Advice Bureau have expressed concerns about extended warranties being mis-sold. The Office of Fair trading investigated the extended warranty market again and published a market review in 2012. They said that the UK market is worth an estimated £1billion a year. Out of this £1billion they estimate 75% of people do not compare prices before buying an extended warranty.

== See also ==
- Warranty
- Extended service plan
- Auto warranty robocalls
- Automotive warranty
