= Campaign management tool =

A campaign management tool is software that facilitates the launching and coordination of political campaigns across multiple social media platforms.

In the past, political campaigns were conducted using traditional methods of personal contact, such as television and radio media purchasing, print advertising and direct mail. However, the rising popularity of the Internet has changed how campaigns talk to voters, and also how campaigns maintain communications between staff members, volunteers and political consultants, and getting the campaign message out via the web, e-mail and interactive web forms.

Campaigns are also utilizing an increasing number of tools that assist with accounting, contact management, and handling increasingly complicated government regulations.

The exact best implementation of these sorts of tools is under debate. Politicians in many states have started websites and weblogs (or "blogs") with a variety of degrees of success. Social software has been used to benefit politicians. However, at the same time, companies are offering tools that push the edge of social responsibility, including those for publishing spam. Other companies pretending to be legitimate polling agencies, attempt to influence voters through leading questions, in so called "push polls".

Some of the tools are those which enable the formation of local groups. These rapidly forming groups give citizens the confidence that they are not alone, and inspire collective actions. As Reed's law predicted, tools that enable group formations at the edges of the network (Edge Tools), deliver measurable value, as can be seen by the use of Meetup and Get Local on the Howard Dean campaign. While many activists and technologists see great value in these tools, many campaign professionals fear the loss of control. The value of these tools to campaigns below the Presidential level also remains uncertain.

Other kinds of internet tools for campaign management do not have such specific methods of organizing people. There is an increasing number of companies providing web-based software to replace database systems that require a specific computer or network. By making databases for GOTV/voter tracking, fundraising, accounting and campaign management accessible from any location, these vendors are allowing campaigns to take advantage of resources that many individual volunteers and campaign staff have available at home, expanding the use of distributed campaigning techniques.

== See also ==
- List of democracy and elections-related topics
- Voter database
