= L. Francis Cissna =

American lawyer and government official (born 1966)

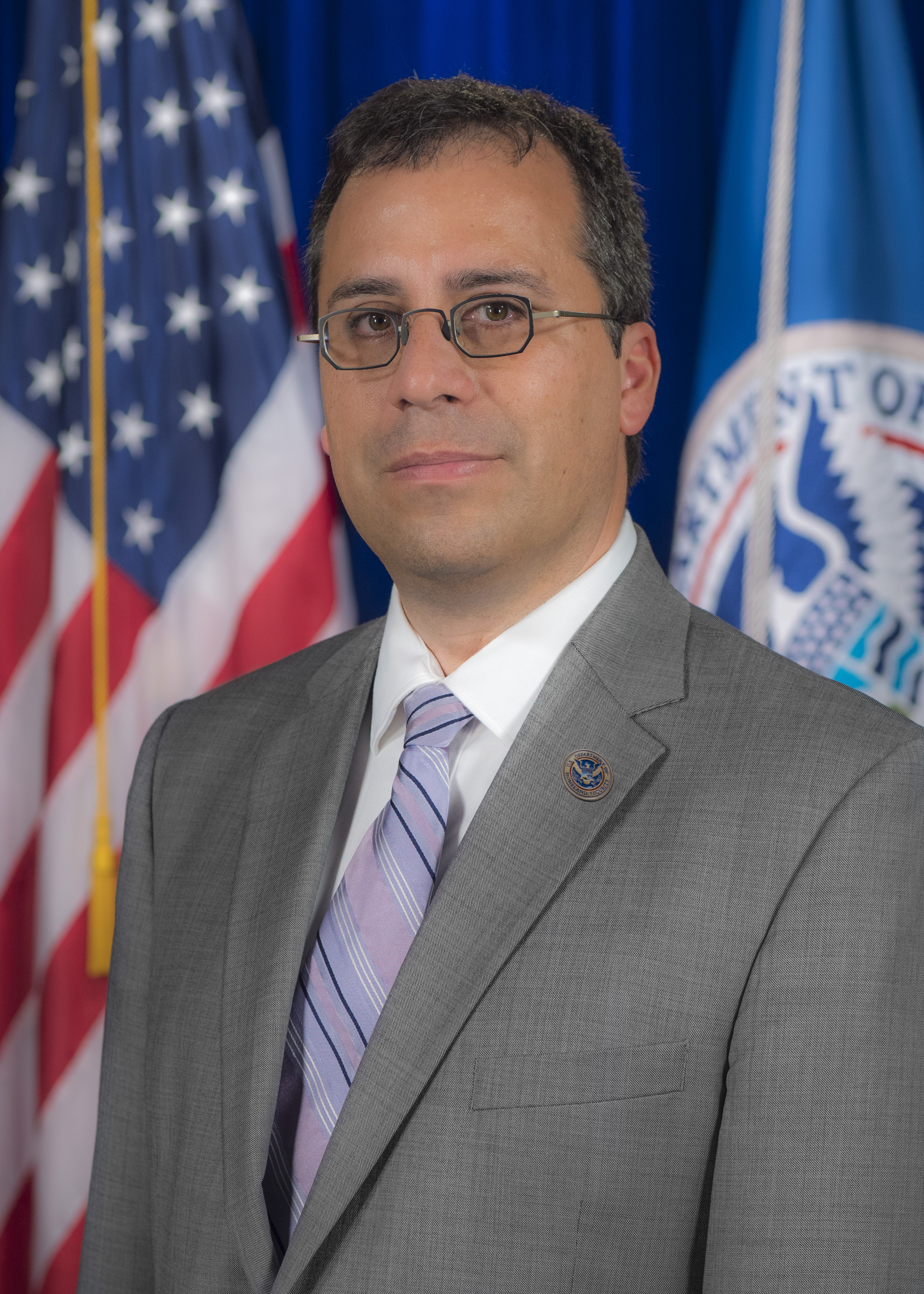

Director of the United States Citizenship and Immigration Services
- In office October 8, 2017 – June 1, 2019
- President: Donald Trump
- Preceded by: León Rodríguez
- Succeeded by: Ur Jaddou

Personal details
- Born: Lee Francis Cissna; July 5, 1966 (age 59) Silver Spring, Maryland, U.S.
- Education: Massachusetts Institute of Technology (BS); Columbia University (MA); Georgetown University (JD)

Lee Francis Cissna (born July 5, 1966) is an American lawyer and government official who served as Director of United States Citizenship and Immigration Services from 2017 to 2019. Prior to assuming that role, he was the Director of Immigration Policy in the Office of Policy of the U.S. Department of Homeland Security.

== Early life and education ==
Cissna is the son of a Peruvian immigrant. He graduated from Massachusetts Institute of Technology with a B.S. in physics and political science. He also attended Columbia University and obtained an M.A. in international affairs, as well as Georgetown University Law Center, where he received his Juris Doctor.

== Career ==
=== Public sector ===
Cissna worked at the U.S. Department of State, serving as a U.S. Foreign Service Officer stationed in Port-au-Prince, Haiti and Stockholm, Sweden. He also worked in the Office of the Chief Counsel under U.S. Citizenship and Immigration Services.

Cissna also served on the staff of Senator Chuck Grassley.

Cissna was the Director of Immigration Policy in the Office of Policy of the U.S. Department of Homeland Security, where he created and administered policy focused on immigration benefits programs, including with respect to temporary workers and immigrants. He was also Chair of the OECD Working Party on Migration.

=== Private sector ===
Cissna was an attorney at the law firm of Kaufman & Canoles in Richmond, Virginia, working in the immigration group. He also practiced law at Steptoe & Johnson LLP and Kirkpatrick & Lockhart LLP in their international trade practice group.

== USCIS Director ==
=== Nomination ===
On April 8, 2017, President Trump announced his intent to nominate Cissna as Director of United States Citizenship and Immigration Services. That agency is under the Department of Homeland Security, where Cissna currently works as director of immigration policy in the Office of Policy.

The Trump administration was interested in Cissna due to his work on the displacement of U.S. workers by foreign workers on H-1B visas. Mark Krikorian, executive director of the Center for Immigration Studies, stated that Cissna is "very knowledgeable about the immigration system" and knows "all of the wrinkles of this stuff."

On April 25, 2017, Cissna's nomination was received in the U.S. Senate and referred to the Committee on the Judiciary. He was confirmed by the U.S. Senate on October 5, 2017.

=== Tenure ===
In February 2018, Cissna announced a new mission statement for USCIS. The new mission statement no longer included the phrase "USCIS secures America's promise as a nation of immigrants." When asked about the removal of this phrase, Cissna said the U.S. is "indisputably a nation of immigrants" and that the agency's mission was "not something where you put eternal professions of American values. That sort of thing belongs chiseled in the wall of a monument, not in some bureaucratic mission statement."

Cissna had a role in the Trump administration family separation policy.

In June 2018, Cissna issued a new policy memo directing USCIS to investigate "thousands of old fingerprint records and files to determine whether foreigners made false or fraudulent statements in their attempts to obtain legal residency in the United States."

According to a September 2018 profile in Politico, as the head of USCIS, Cissna has "transformed his agency into more of an enforcement body and less of a service provider."

=== Resignation ===
On April 7, 2019, rumors began to float that White House advisor Stephen Miller was pressuring for the replacement of Cissna as part of larger purge of immigration and homeland security officials in the Trump administration. Sources indicated that Julie Kirchner, the former executive director of the Federation for American Immigration Reform (FAIR), which pushes for lower levels of immigration, was being considered as an option to lead the agency. Leaders of anti-immigration groups, including Rosemary Jenks at NumbersUSA, RJ Hauman at FAIR, and Mark Krikorian at Center for Immigration Studies, pushed for Cissna to remain at the head of USCIS, calling him effective at his work and skillful within the bounds of the law at restricting legal immigration to the United States. Senator Grassley referred to a potential firing of Cissna as "a real mistake ... to fire good people like that."

On May 24, 2019, Cissna announced in an email to USCIS employees that he had submitted his resignation at the request of President Trump, effective June 1.

On October 3, 2019, the Department of Homeland Security confirmed that Cissna had returned to the department's Office of Policy division in which he worked previously.

== Personal life ==
Cissna's wife's mother came to the U.S. as a Palestinian refugee in 1957. Cissna speaks English and Spanish. He has two children.

Political offices
| Preceded by León Rodríguez | Director of the United States Citizenship and Immigration Services; 2017–2019 | Succeeded by Ur Jaddou |
