= Cost efficiency =

Measure of parallel computing efficacy

Cost efficiency (or cost optimality), in the context of parallel computer algorithms, refers to a measure of how effectively parallel computing can be used to solve a particular problem. A parallel algorithm is considered cost efficient if its asymptotic running time multiplied by the number of processing units involved in the computation is comparable to the running time of the best sequential algorithm.

For example, an algorithm that can be solved in $O(n)$ time using the best known sequential algorithm and $O\left(\frac{n}{p}\right)$ in a parallel computer with $p$ processors will be considered cost efficient.

Cost efficiency also has applications to human services.
