= Rowan v. United States Post Office Department =

Rowan v. U. S. Post Office Dept.
- Supreme Court of the United States

Argued January 22, 1970 Decided May 4, 1970
- Full case name: Daniel Rowan, dba American Book Service, et al., Appellants, v. United States Post Office Department, et al.
- Citations: 397 U.S. 728 (more) 90 S. Ct. 1484; 25 L. Ed. 2d 736; 1970 U.S. LEXIS 44

Case history
- Prior: 300 F. Supp. 1036 (C.D. Cal. 1969); probable jurisdiction noted, 396 U.S. 885 (1969).

Holding
- The addressee of postal mail has unreviewable discretion to decide whether to receive further material from a particular sender, and a vendor does not have a constitutional right to send unwanted material to an unreceptive addressee.

Court membership
- Chief Justice Warren E. Burger Associate Justices Hugo Black · William O. Douglas; John M. Harlan II · William J. Brennan Jr. Potter Stewart · Byron White; Thurgood Marshall

Case opinions
- Majority: Burger, joined by unanimous
- Concurrence: Brennan, joined by Douglas

Laws applied
- 39 U.S.C. § 4009

Rowan v. Post Office Dept., 397 U.S. 728 (1970), is a case in which the United States Supreme Court ruled that an addressee of postal mail has sole, complete, unfettered and unreviewable discretion to decide whether he or she wishes to receive further material from a particular sender, and that the sender does not have a constitutional right to send unwanted material into someone's home. It thus created a quasi-exception to free speech in cases in which a person is held as a "captive audience".

== Background ==
While the statute only explicitly applies to "a pandering advertisement which offers for sale matter which the addressee in his sole discretion believes to be erotically arousing or sexually provocative", a lower court had found that § 4009 was constitutional when interpreted to prohibit advertisements similar to those initially mailed to the addressee, and this decision upholds that interpretation. In other words, a recipient may obtain a Prohibitory Order prohibiting mail from a given sender, and the mailing used as the basis for that order need not be erotic or sexually provocative in order to be the basis of prohibiting the sender from sending further mail. The only absolute requirement is that it must be possible to construe the mail as an offer to sell goods or services.

== Opinion of the Court ==
The opinion of the Court was delivered by Justice Warren Burger, and a concurring opinion was filed by Justice William Brennan, joined by William Douglas. The majority concluded that the addressee of postal mail has sole, complete, unfettered and unreviewable discretion to decide whether to receive further material from a particular sender, and a vendor does not have a constitutional right to send unwanted material to an unreceptive addressee.

== Subsequent developments ==
The United States Postal Service's PS Form 1500 still refers to material that the applicant considers "erotically arousing or sexually provocative" even though the court interpreted the statute to apply to any unwanted advertising: "The statute allows the addressee sole, complete, unfettered and unreviewable discretion to decide whether he wishes to receive any further material from a particular sender."

== See also ==
- Prohibitory Order
- Administrative Procedure Act (United States)
- Due Process
- Monis v The Queen
- List of United States Supreme Court cases
- List of United States Supreme Court cases by the Burger Court
- List of United States Supreme Court cases, volume 397
- List of United States Supreme Court cases involving the First Amendment
