= Automotive warranty =

Guarantee provided by a vehicle manufacturer or a third party

An automotive warranty is a guarantee provided by a vehicle manufacturer or a third party, ensuring that any defects or issues with a vehicle will be repaired or addressed within a specified period after purchase. This warranty is most often an important aspect of purchasing vehicles since it provides buyers with protection against manufacturing defects or unexpected failures.

== Scope and duration ==
The scope and duration of automotive warranties can vary significantly, but they generally cover areas such as: bumper-to-bumper warranty, powertrain warranty, corrosion warranty, emissions warranty and others. There is also an "extended car Warranty" also known as a "service contract" which is purchased separately. It often comes into effect after the expiration of the manufacturer's warranty.

The specific terms and conditions of automotive warranties can vary widely based on the manufacturer, the model of the vehicle, and sometimes even the country in which the vehicle is purchased.

== Automotive warranty claims ==
Automotive warranty claims are requests made by vehicle owners or authorized service centers to the vehicle's manufacturer or warranty provider for repair or replacement of parts and components that are covered under the vehicle's warranty.

Automotive warranty claim involves a lot of processes which may include the warranty coverage, identification of issue, verification, documentation, claim submission, claim review and approval, repair and settlement.

Warranty claims are important for consumers because they help mitigate the cost of repairs due to manufacturing defects or other covered issues. For manufacturers, managing warranty claims efficiently is crucial for customer satisfaction and maintaining brand reputation.

Filing an automotive warranty claims can be very cumbersome. The vehicle owner can make the process simpler by engaging companies that offer Automotive warranty claims processing services.

=== Automotive warranty claims processing ===
Automotive warranty claims processing refers to the procedure that is followed when a vehicle owner or a dealership makes a claim under the vehicle's warranty. This claim is made to address repairs or replacements that are covered under the warranty agreement.

Automotive warranty claims processing is often offered by reliable companies that are into the warranty industry niche. The process typically involves several steps to ensure that the claim is valid, the repair is necessary, and the costs are covered as per the warranty terms. The process may involve the identification of a problem, service appointment, initial assessment, claim submission, claim review, approval or denial, repair and reimbursement, documentation and follow-Up.

== See also ==
- Automotive industry
- Automotive engineering
- Automobile repair shop
- Warranty
- Extended warranty
- Warranty deed
