= Form N-400 =

United States citizenship application

USCIS Form N-400, Application for Naturalization (2016 revision)

Form N-400 is used to apply for US citizenship through the naturalization process. Lawful permanent residents (also known as green card holders) of the United States, who meet the eligibility requirements, can file N-400 form to request citizenship. In the United States, 8.8 million Lawful Permanent Residents are eligible to naturalize.

Becoming an American citizen gives the same rights and privileges of citizenship as natural born American citizens, except one: naturalized U.S. citizens are not eligible for the Office of the President or Vice President of the United States.

== US citizenship eligibility requirements ==
To be able to apply for citizenship through naturalization, you have to meet the following requirements. You must:

- Be 18 years of age or above.
- Be a lawful permanent resident for 5 years (3 years if married to a US citizen).
- Have maintained continuous residence during the past 5 years (3 years if married to a US citizen).
- Have maintained physical presence during the past 5 years (3 years if married to a US citizen).
- Have good moral character.
- Have basic knowledge of English.
- Have basic knowledge of US government and history.
- Be willing to take the Oath of Allegiance.

== Content ==
The N-400 form is a series of questions about eligibility, personal information, marital history, children, criminal activities and the oath of allegiance to the United States. Many private sector online services are available to candidates for naturalization to help them complete the form. Sometimes a lawyer's help is required.

Filing the form costs $760 when submitted by mail, or $710 when filed online. The biometrics fee is now included in the filing fee as of April 2024. Reduced fees or fee waivers may be available for eligible applicants.

After filing the form, the applicant undergoes an interview process with the United States Citizenship and Immigration Services (USCIS). The USCIS interview includes an English and civics test. The English test has three components: reading, writing, and speaking. The civics test covers important U.S. history and government topics.
