= United States Citizenship and Immigration Services =

US immigration agency

- USCIS logo

Agency overview
- Formed: March 1, 2003; 23 years ago
- Jurisdiction: Federal government of the United States
- Headquarters: 5900 Capital Gateway Drive Camp Springs, Maryland, U.S.
- Employees: 24,200+ (2025)
- Annual budget: $6.81 billion (2025)
- Agency executives: Joseph Edlow, Director; James Kernochan, Deputy Director
- Parent agency: United States Department of Homeland Security
- Key document: USCIS Policy Manual
- Website: uscis.gov

United States Citizenship and Immigration Services (USCIS) is an agency of the United States Department of Homeland Security (DHS) that administers the country's naturalization and immigration system.

== History ==
The USCIS is a successor to the Immigration and Naturalization Service (INS), which was dissolved by the Homeland Security Act of 2002 and replaced by three components within the DHS: USCIS, Immigration and Customs Enforcement (ICE), and Customs and Border Protection (CBP).

=== Expansion of enforcement authority ===
In September 2025, the Department of Homeland Security expanded U.S. Citizenship and Immigration Services' law enforcement capabilities by developing a force of special agents who have the authority to investigate suspected visa and immigration fraud. Before USCIS' employment of its own special agents, these investigations were primarily handled by Homeland Security Investigations, a component of US Immigration and Customs Enforcement.

=== Screening requirements ===
In 2025, a policy alert was given for new guidelines that would be enforced immediately for USCIS: immigrant candidates would be assessed for views considered anti-American or antisemitic. The policy was criticized on the grounds that its vagueness could discourage people from applying out of fear of violating the policy.

== Functions ==
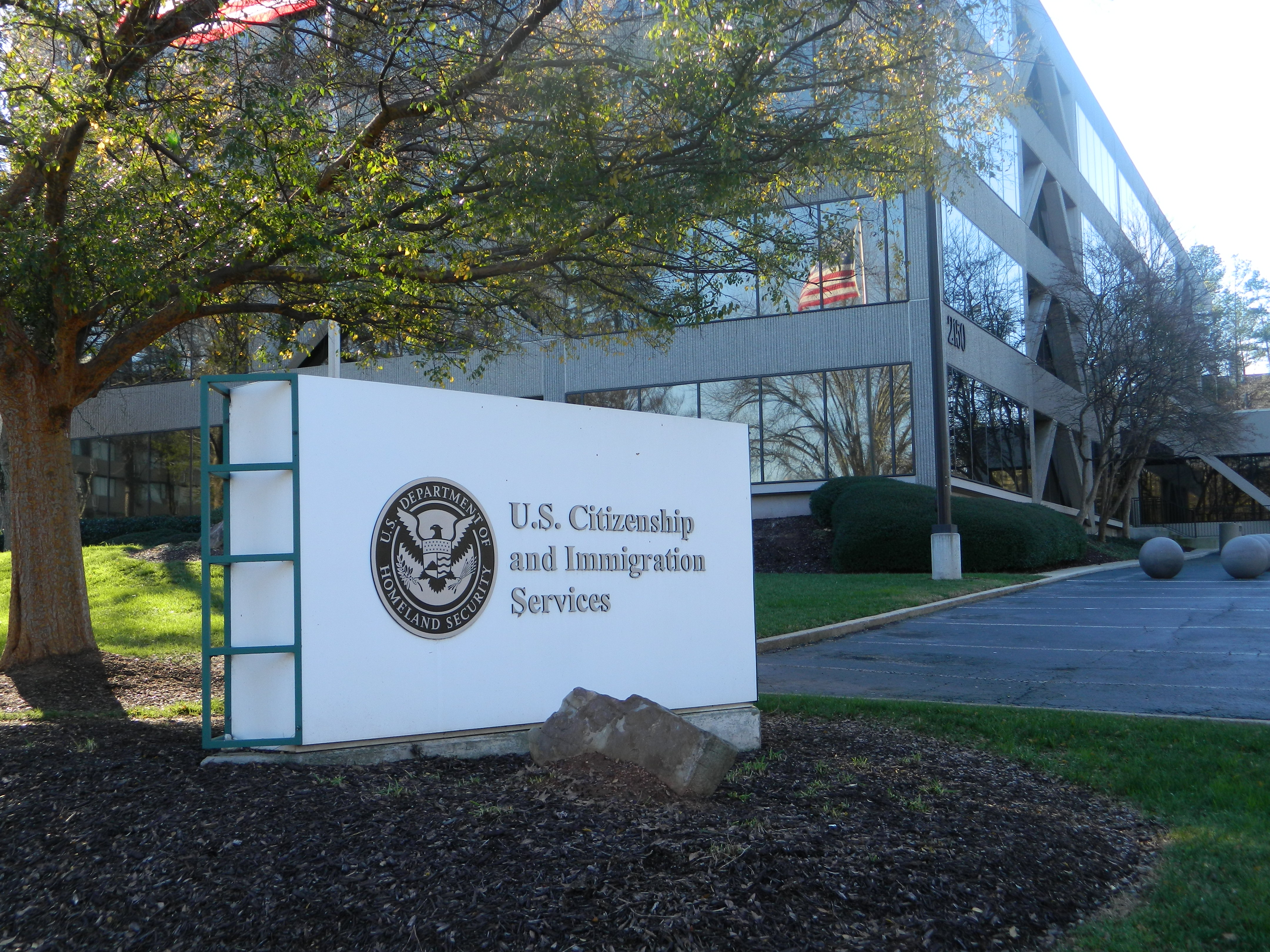
USCIS Office in Atlanta, Georgia

USCIS processes immigrant visa petitions, naturalization applications, asylum applications, applications for adjustment of status (green cards), and refugee applications.

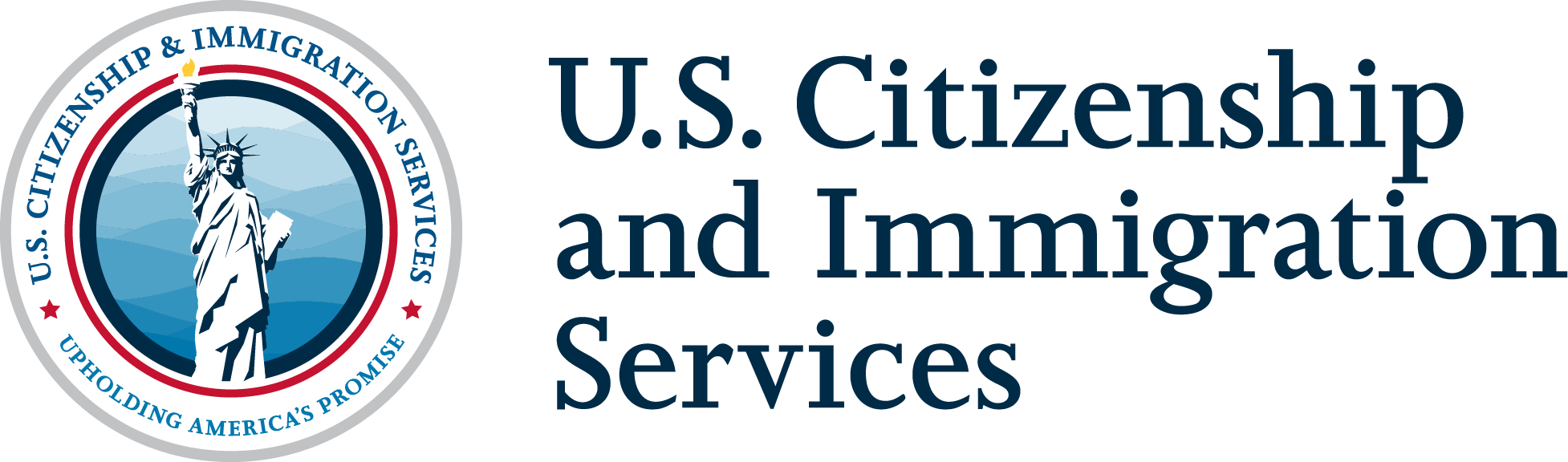
Updated logo announced under Biden, used September 2024-January 2025

It also makes adjudicative decisions performed at the service centers, and manages all other immigration benefits functions (i.e., not immigration enforcement) performed by the former INS.

The USCIS's other responsibilities include:

- Administration of immigration services and benefits
- Issuing employment authorization documents (EAD)
- Adjudicating petitions for non-immigrant temporary workers (H-1B, O-1, etc.)

While core immigration benefits functions remain the same as under the INS, a new goal is to process immigrants' applications more efficiently.

A lawful permanent resident is eligible to become a U.S. citizen after holding a permanent resident card for at least five continuous years, with no trips out of the country of 180 days or more.

If the lawful permanent resident marries a U.S. citizen, eligibility for U.S. citizenship is shortened to three years so long as the resident has been living with their spouse continuously for at least three years and the spouse has been a resident for at least three years.

=== Forms ===
USCIS handles all forms and processing materials related to immigration and naturalization. This is evident from USCIS's predecessor, the Immigration and Naturalization Service (INS), which is defunct as of March 1, 2003.

USCIS handles two kinds of forms: those related to immigration, and those related to naturalization. Forms are designated by a specific name, and an alphanumeric sequence consisting of a letter followed by two or three digits.

Forms related to immigration are designated with an I (for example, I-551, Permanent Resident Card) and forms related to naturalization are designated by an N (for example, N-400, Application for Naturalization).

== Directors ==
No.	Portrait	Director	Took office	Left office	Time in office	Party	President
1	Eduardo Aguirre	Eduardo Aguirre (born 1946)	August 15, 2003	June 16, 2005	1 year, 305 days	Republican	George W. Bush (R)
–	Michael Petrucelli	Michael Petrucelli; Acting	June 17, 2005	July 25, 2005	38 days	?	George W. Bush (R)
2	Emilio T. Gonzalez	Emilio T. Gonzalez (born 1956)	December 21, 2005	April 18, 2008	2 years, 119 days	Republican	George W. Bush (R)
–	Jonathan "Jock" Scharfen	Jonathan "Jock" Scharfen; Acting	April 21, 2008	December 2, 2008	225 days	?	George W. Bush (R)
3	Alejandro Mayorkas	Alejandro Mayorkas (born 1959)	August 12, 2009	December 23, 2013	4 years, 133 days	Democratic	Barack Obama (D)
–	Lori Scialabba	Lori Scialabba; Acting	December 23, 2013	July 9, 2014	198 days	?	Barack Obama (D)
4	León Rodríguez	León Rodríguez (born 1962)	July 9, 2014	January 20, 2017	2 years, 195 days	Democratic	Barack Obama (D)
–	Lori Scialabba	Lori Scialabba; Acting	January 20, 2017	March 31, 2017	70 days	?	Donald Trump (R)
–	James W. McCament	James W. McCament; Acting	March 31, 2017	October 8, 2017	191 days	?	Donald Trump (R)
5	L. Francis Cissna	L. Francis Cissna (born 1966)	October 8, 2017	June 1, 2019	1 year, 236 days	Independent	Donald Trump (R)
–	Mark Koumans	Mark Koumans; Acting	June 1, 2019	June 10, 2019	9 days	Independent	Donald Trump (R)
–	Ken Cuccinelli[1]	Ken Cuccinelli^{[1]} (born 1968); Acting	June 10, 2019	November 18, 2019	161 days	Republican	Donald Trump (R)
–	Mark Koumans	Mark Koumans; Acting	November 18, 2019	February 20, 2020	94 days	Independent	Donald Trump (R)
–	Joseph Edlow	Joseph Edlow (born 1981); Acting	February 20, 2020	January 20, 2021	335 days	Independent	Donald Trump (R)
–	Tracy Renaud	Tracy Renaud; Acting	January 20, 2021	August 3, 2021	195 days	Independent	Joe Biden (D)
6	Ur Mendoza Jaddou	Ur Mendoza Jaddou (born 1974)	August 3, 2021	January 20, 2025	3 years, 170 days	Independent	Joe Biden (D)
–	Jennifer B. Higgins	Jennifer B. Higgins; Acting	January 20, 2025	February 9, 2025	20 days	?	Donald Trump (R)
–	Kika Scott	Kika Scott; Acting	February 9, 2025	May 25, 2025	105 days	?	Donald Trump (R)
–	Angelica Alfonso-Royals	Angelica Alfonso-Royals; Acting	May 25, 2025	July 18, 2025	54 days	?	Donald Trump (R)
7	Joseph Edlow	Joseph Edlow (born 1981)	July 18, 2025	Incumbent	1 year, 121 days	Independent	Donald Trump (R)

^{1} Ken Cuccinelli served from July 8 to December 31, 2019, as de facto Acting Director. His tenure as Acting Director was ruled unlawful. He remained Principal Deputy Director at USCIS for the remainder of his tenure.

== Immigration courts and judges ==
The United States immigration courts, immigration judges, and the Board of Immigration Appeals, which hears appeals from them, are part of the Executive Office for Immigration Review (EOIR) within the United States Department of Justice. (USCIS is part of the Department of Homeland Security.)

== Operations ==
=== Internet presence ===
USCIS's official website was redesigned in 2009 and unveiled on September 22, 2009. The last major redesign before 2009 was in October 2006. The website now includes a virtual assistant, Emma, who answers questions in English and Spanish.

=== Inquiry and issue resolution ===
USCIS's website contains self-service tools, including a case status checker and address change request form.

Applicants, petitioners, and their authorized representatives can also submit case inquiries and service requests on USCIS's website. The inquiries and requests are routed to the relevant USCIS center or office to process.

Case inquiries may involve asking about a case that is outside of normal expected USCIS processing times for the form.

Inquiries and service requests may also concern not receiving a notice, card, or document by mail, correcting typographical errors, and requesting disability accommodations.

If the self-service tools on USCIS's website cannot resolve an issue, the applicant, petitioner, or authorized representative can contact the USCIS Contact Center.

If the Contact Center cannot assist the inquirer directly, the issue will be forwarded to the relevant USCIS center or office for review. Some applicants and petitioners, primarily those outside of the U.S., may also schedule appointments on USCIS's website.

=== Funding ===
Unlike most other federal agencies, USCIS is funded almost entirely by user fees, most of it via the Immigration Examinations Fee Account (IEFA).

The Immigration and Nationality Act authorizes USCIS to collect fees for its immigration case adjudication and naturalization services.

In fiscal year 2020, USCIS had a budget of US$4.85 billion; 97.3% of it was funded by fees and 2.7% by congressional appropriations.

=== Staffing ===
USCIS consists of approximately 19,000 federal employees and contractors working at 223 offices around the world.

=== Offices ===
A field USCIS office provides interviews for all non-asylum cases; naturalization ceremonies; appointments for information; and applicant services.

USCIS Asylum offices schedule interviews only for asylum and suspension of deportation and special rule cancellation of removal under the Nicaraguan Adjustment and Central American Relief Act (NACARA).

Asylum offices do not provide information services. Applications are not filed at asylum offices.

International offices provide services to U.S. citizens, permanent U.S. residents, and certain other people who are visiting or residing outside the U.S. International offices are in the following cities

City	Country
Ankara	Turkey
Beijing	China
Guangzhou	China
Havana	Cuba
San Salvador	El Salvador
Guatemala City	Guatemala
Tegucigalpa	Honduras
New Delhi	India
Nairobi	Kenya
Mexico City	Mexico

== See also ==
- Visa policy of the United States
  - H-1B Visa
  - Permanent residence (United States) ("Green card")
  - Visa Waiver Program
- The other two major U.S. immigration-related agencies:
  - U.S. Customs and Border Protection (CBP)
  - U.S. Immigration and Customs Enforcement (ICE)

=== Comparable international agencies ===
- Immigration, Refugees and Citizenship Canada
- Irish Naturalisation and Immigration Service
- Bureau of Immigration (India)
- Directorate General of Immigration (Indonesia)
- UK Visas and Immigration
