= Joe Kent =

American soldier and politician (born 1980)

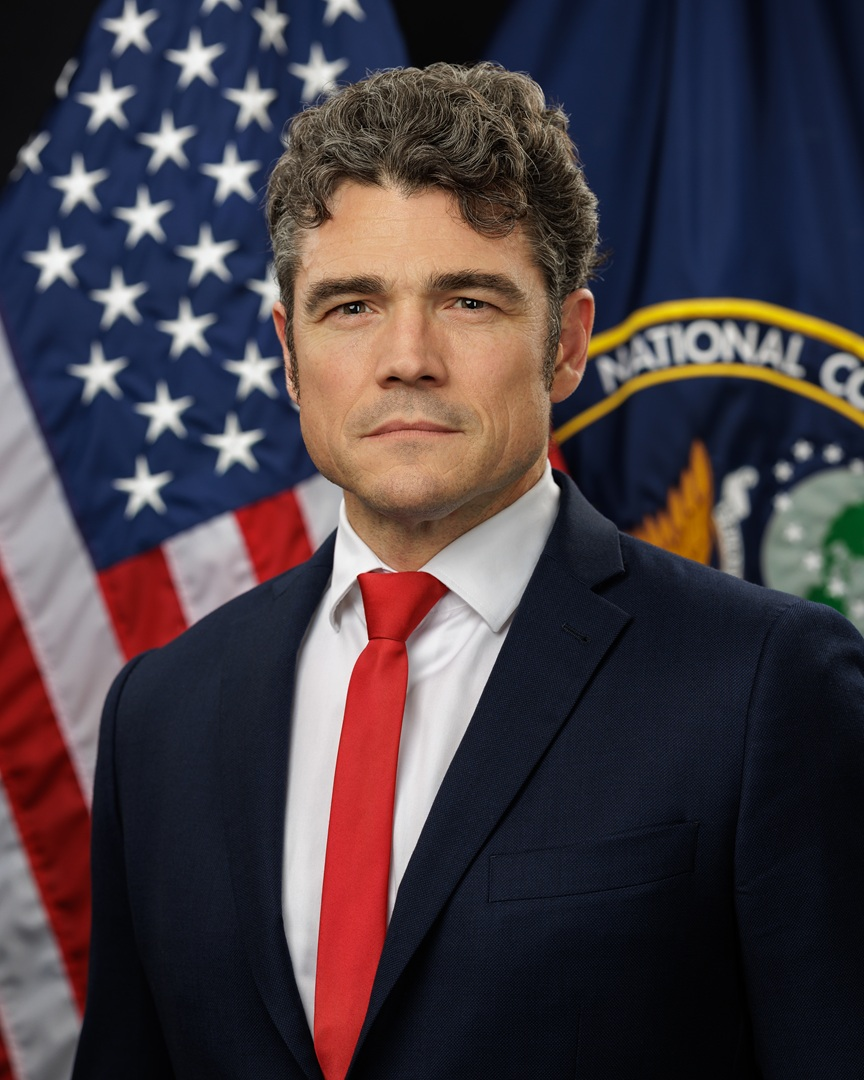
- Official portrait, 2025

8th Director of the National Counterterrorism Center
- In office July 31, 2025 – March 17, 2026
- President: Donald Trump
- Preceded by: Christine Abizaid
- Succeeded by: Joe Weirsky (acting)

Acting Chief of Staff to the Director of National Intelligence
- In office circa. February 2025 – July 19, 2025
- President: Donald Trump
- Director: Tulsi Gabbard
- Succeeded by: Matt Baker

Personal details
- Born: Joseph Clay Kent; April 11, 1980 (age 46) Sweet Home, Oregon, U.S.
- Party: Republican (2021–present)
- Other political affiliations: Libertarian (2012–2019); Democratic (2019–2021)
- Spouses: Shannon M. Smith (m. 2014; died 2019); Heather Kaiser (m. 2023)
- Children: 2
- Education: Norwich University (BS)

Military service
- Allegiance: United States
- Branch/service: United States Army
- Years of service: 1998–2018
- Rank: Chief warrant officer
- Unit: 75th Ranger Regiment; Army Special Forces; Intelligence Support Activity; Special Activities Center
- Battles/wars: War on terror; Iraq War; First Battle of Fallujah

Joseph Clay Kent (born April 11, 1980) is an American politician, former United States Army warrant officer, and former Central Intelligence Agency paramilitary officer who served as the director of the National Counterterrorism Center from 2025 to 2026. A member of the Republican Party, Kent was the nominee in the United States House of Representatives election for Washington's third congressional district in 2022 and 2024.

Kent enlisted in the 75th Ranger Regiment and applied for the Special Forces before the September 11 attacks. He served eleven combat tours, primarily in Iraq, and retired in 2018, becoming a paramilitary officer with the CIA. In January 2019, Kent's wife, Shannon, was killed in a suicide bombing in Manbij, Syria. He became involved in political advocacy after Shannon's death.

In 2022, Kent ran for Congress in Washington's third congressional district. Running as a supporter of Donald Trump, he eliminated incumbent Republican Jaime Herrera Beutler in the nonpartisan primary but lost to Democrat Marie Gluesenkamp Perez in the general election. Kent ran again in 2024, losing to Gluesenkamp Perez in a rematch. Kent has ascribed to various political views ranging from libertarian to far-right. (Note: Attributed to multiple references:)

In February 2025, Trump nominated Kent for director of the National Counterterrorism Center. That month, he began serving as the chief of staff to Tulsi Gabbard, the director of national intelligence. Kent was confirmed by the Senate in July. In March 2026, Kent resigned as the director of the National Counterterrorism Center, citing disagreement over U.S. involvement in the Iran war and the influence of Israel and the Israeli lobby in domestic politics.

== Early life and education ==
Joseph Clay Kent was born on April 11, 1980, in a cabin in Sweet Home, Oregon. Kent was the first child of Roman Catholic parents who later graduated from law school. He was raised in Portland, Oregon. Kent expressed an early interest in the military, constructing weapons out of Lego bricks. He was inspired to join the United States Army after watching television coverage of the Battle of Mogadishu. Kent graduated from Norwich University with a degree in strategic studies and defense analysis.

== Career ==
=== Military and intelligence service (1998–2019) ===
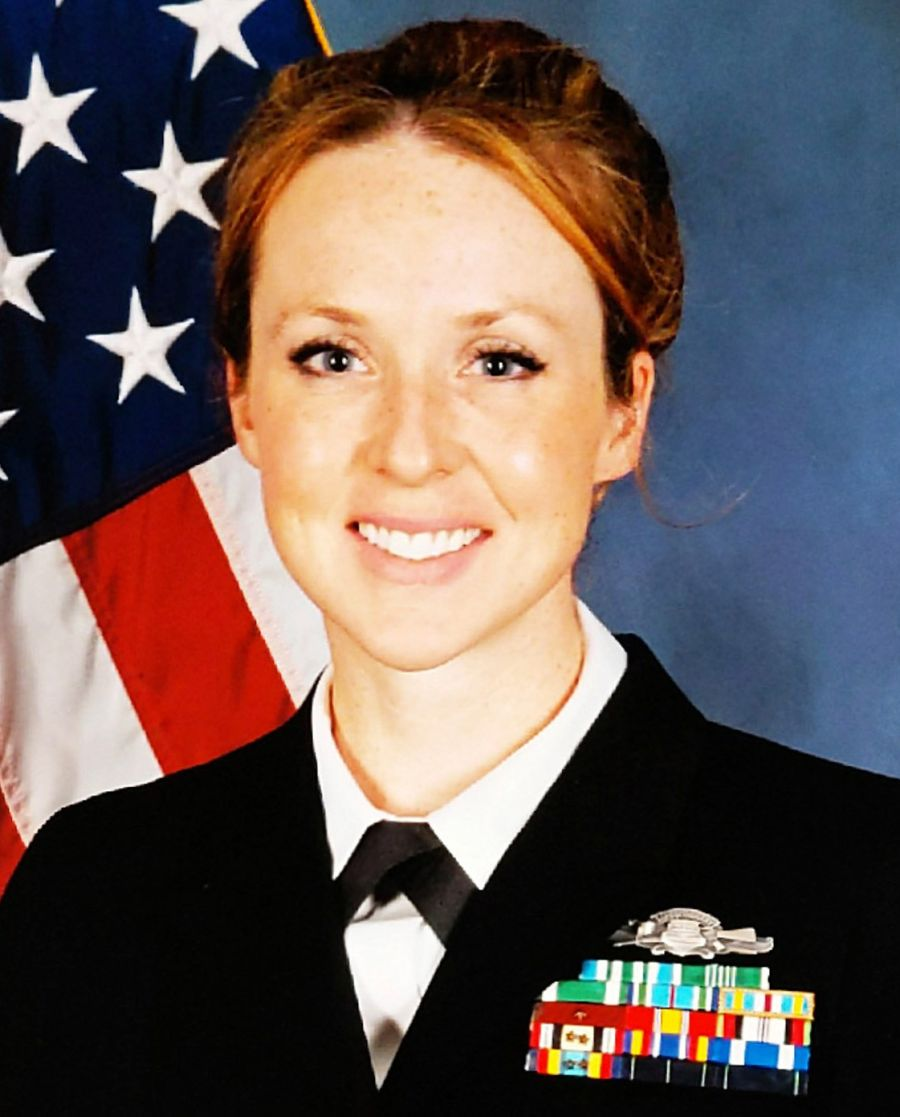
Shannon Smith, Kent's first wife, was killed in the 2019 Manbij bombing.

At 17, Kent enlisted in the Army on a Ranger contract, allowing him to enter the 75th Ranger Regiment. He applied for the Special Forces before the September 11 attacks, and took a qualification course days before the attacks. By September 2003, following his training, Kent was deployed to Iraq, where he fought in the First Battle of Fallujah, and searched for Iraqi officials. He served eleven combat tours including deployments in Yemen and north Africa before retiring. Kent held the final rank of chief warrant officer. He later became a paramilitary officer with the Central Intelligence Agency.

In December 2014, Kent married Shannon Smith, a cryptologist whom he had met at Fort Belvoir, where he had been assigned to an Army Special Operations Command. They had two children, born in 2015 and 2017. In January 2019, Shannon was killed in a suicide bombing in Manbij. After the bombing, Kent left government work, and began to write columns for CNN, Breitbart News, and Fox News speaking out against the war on terror. He consulted with the White House and volunteered for Veterans for Trump and Concerned Veterans for America.

=== U.S. congressional campaigns in Washington (2021–2022; 2023–2024) ===
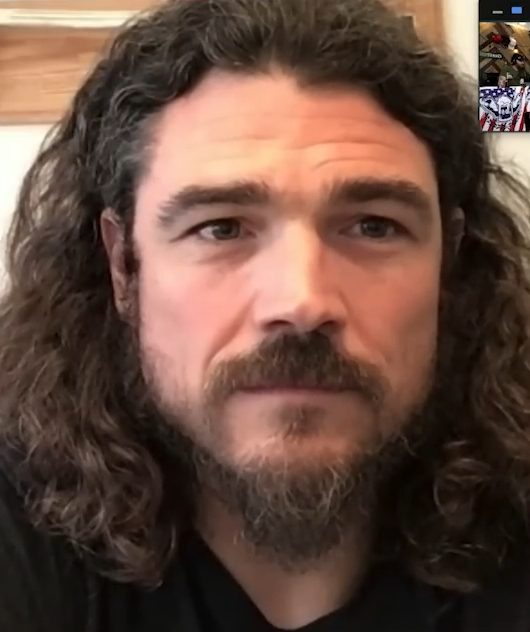
Kent in 2020

On February 18, 2021, Kent announced his intention to run in the United States House of Representatives election for Washington's third congressional district as a Republican, citing Jaime Herrera Beutler's decision to vote to impeach Donald Trump in his second impeachment following the January 6 Capitol attack. Kent aligned himself with Trump in his campaign announcement. By July, he had raised US$366,000, the most of any candidate in the election at that point, and garnered financial support from Steve Wynn and Peter Thiel. In September, Trump endorsed Kent. His prominence was bolstered by Tucker Carlson, who had frequently had Kent as guest on the Fox News program Tucker Carlson Tonight (2016–2023).

In March 2022, he entered into a dispute with white supremacist commentator Nick Fuentes, who claimed during a livestream that Kent privately told him, "I love what you're doing." News agencies could not verify the claim; Kent denied that the statement had ever been made. After Kent disavowed Fuentes and stated he had not sought his endorsement over his views on race and religion, Fuentes chastised Kent for not being sufficiently conservative. Kent was later interviewed by American Virtue, an organization associated with Fuentes, and stated American culture was "anti-white" and "anti-straight-white-male". The Associated Press reported in July the Kent campaign had paid a member of the Proud Boys, a far-right militia, as a consultant, that Kent was a political ally of Joey Gibson, a right-wing political activist, and that Kent had photographed himself with Greyson Arnold, a self-described Christian nationalist. The campaign told the Associated Press Kent was unaware who Arnold was. In September, CNN reported Kent had given an interview to Arnold. In his campaign, he made repeated references to Sam Francis, a paleoconservative writer who identified as a white nationalist late in life.

Kent defeated Herrera Beutler in the state's open primary in August, though he received fewer votes than Marie Gluesenkamp Perez, a Democrat. Gluesenkamp Perez shifted her campaign towards issues with broad Democratic appeal, including abortion, as well as schools and jobs. Kent's views led to Gluesenkamp Perez garnering some Republican support. She defeated Kent in one of the largest upsets that year. He initially refused to concede, but eventually did so in December. On January 11, 2023, Kent announced a second campaign for Washington's third congressional district. Kent married Heather Kaiser that year. By October 2024, polling between Gluesenkamp Perez and Kent indicated that the election was likely to be close. That month, they debated at KATU's studio in Portland, Oregon. Gluesenkamp Perez won the 2024 election in November.

=== Acting chief of staff to the director of national intelligence (February–July 2025) ===
By February 2025, Kent had been serving as the acting chief of staff to Tulsi Gabbard, the director of national intelligence; his role was disclosed by The Washington Post in March. Responding to a request from the Trump administration, Kent requested the National Intelligence Council conduct an intelligence assessment on connections between the government of Venezuela and the organized crime syndicate Tren de Aragua. After the report failed to yield associations between the government and the gang, he pressured Michael Collins, the acting chairman, to reassess its analysis after The New York Times reported on the internal report. The assessment conflicted with Trump's invocation of the Alien Enemies Act, which requires a connection to a foreign state. Kent was a member of the Signal group chat involved in one of the United States government group chat leaks.

== Director of the National Counterterrorism Center (2025–2026) ==
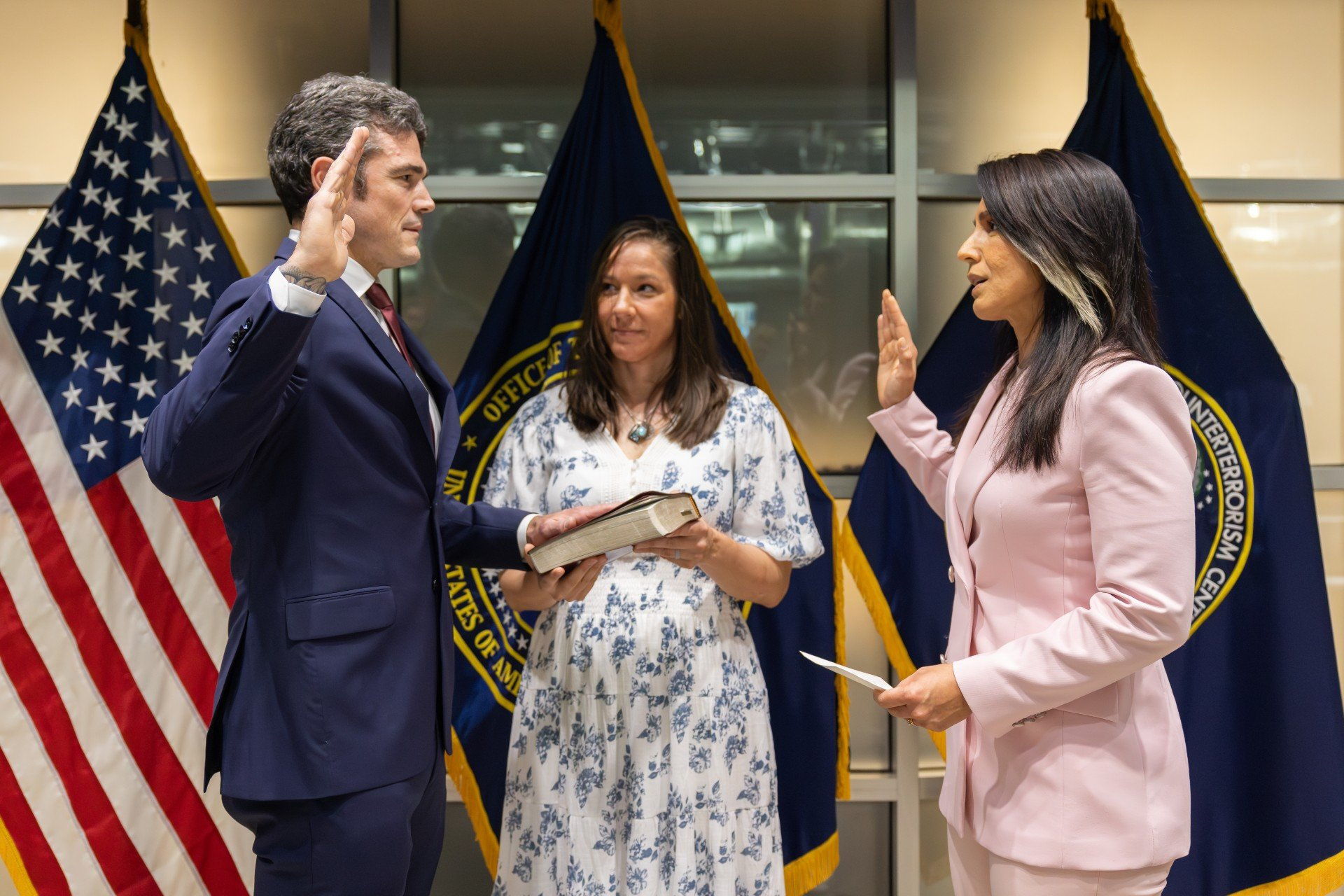
Kent is sworn in as director of the National Counterterrorism Center in July 2025.

On February 3, 2025, Donald Trump named Kent as his nominee for director of the National Counterterrorism Center. He appeared before the Senate Select Committee on Intelligence on April 9, in which he defended his involvement in the Signal group chat and asserted the government was involved in the January 6 Capitol attack. On July 30, Kent was confirmed by the Senate in a 52–44 vote along party lines. In October, The New York Times reported Kent had obtained access to the Federal Bureau of Investigation's files on the assassination of Charlie Kirk, alarming the bureau's director, Kash Patel. According to The Wall Street Journal, Kent had been sidelined from the team responsible for producing and delivering the President's Daily Brief in the final months of his tenure.

=== Resignation ===
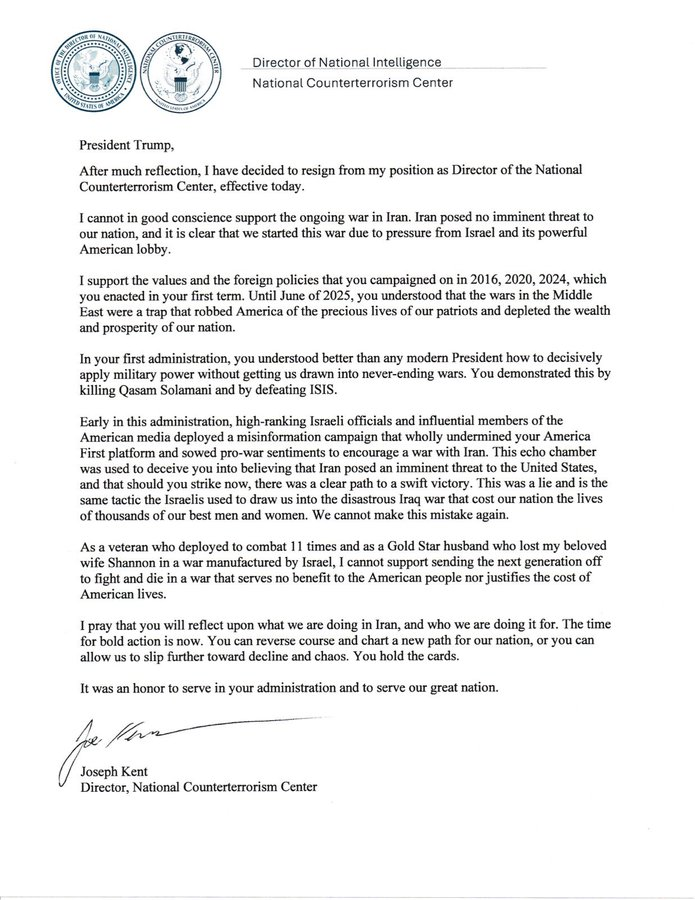
Kent's resignation letter

On March 16, 2026, Kent told Trump, vice president JD Vance, and White House chief of staff Susie Wiles that he intended to resign as director of the National Counterterrorism Center over Trump's decision to initiate the Iran war. The following day, he published a resignation letter, writing on X that the U.S. entered the war amid "pressure from Israel and its powerful American lobby". Kent denied that Iran was an "imminent threat" to the United States. According to Semafor, Kent had been facing an investigation by the Federal Bureau of Investigation for allegedly leaking classified information. The inquiry began several months prior to his resignation.

In an interview with Tucker Carlson the following day, Kent said that he and other senior officials were "not allowed" to share concerns about the necessity of airstrikes with Trump. He alleged that the decision-making process had been limited to a select few advisors and continued to emphasize the involvement of Israeli officials. Kent appeared on the podcasts of several political commentators associated with the MAGA movement, including Megyn Kelly, Saagar Enjeti, and Shawn Ryan, in an effort to encourage opposition to the war.

== Political positions ==
Kent voted for George W. Bush in 2000 and 2004 before shifting his political beliefs towards libertarianism, supporting Ron Paul. According to voting records, he was registered with the Libertarian Party in the 2012 presidential election until 2019, when he became a Democrat; Kent voted for Bernie Sanders in the 2020 Democratic Party presidential primaries in order to support Republicans in that year's presidential election. A spokesman for Kent described his political philosophy as "inclusive populism", rejecting discrimination.

Kent has embraced false claims of fraud in the 2020 presidential election. A month following the January 6 Capitol attack, he stated Donald Trump had "no control" over the mob and attributed the severity of the attack to security planning. Kent attended the Justice for J6 rally and compared the treatment of rioters to that of Iraqi citizens in the Iraq War. He later called for releasing security footage of the attack, and claimed the mob was brought to violence by provocateurs associated with the deep state. After the FBI search of Mar-a-Lago, Kent told Steve Bannon on War Room the raid constituted "war". He called for defunding the Federal Bureau of Investigation in response.

In January 2022 Kent led a rally against a false claim that the Washington State Board of Health was set to forcefully quarantine citizens who did not get the COVID-19 vaccine. In March, he appeared at an event organized by the Washington State Three Percenters, a far-right militia. Kent once advocated for a federal ban on abortion, but later narrowed his position towards states' rights. By the following month, he had called for an investigation into Anthony Fauci over the origin of SARS-CoV-2 and for an immigration moratorium. In September, Kent stated Fauci should be charged with murder and described COVID-19 vaccines as "experimental gene therapy"; he is unvaccinated against COVID-19. At a rally with Matt Gaetz in September 2021, Kent advocated for school vouchers and per-child tax deductions for parents. Kent opposed several proposals to replace the Interstate Bridge, including tolling and light rail, in his 2024 campaign.

=== Military affairs ===
Kent is a non-interventionist, citing his military experience and the death of his wife. He began to question the management of the U.S. military during the Iraq War, when officials sought to eliminate members of Saddam Hussein's government. According to Mother Jones, Kent read David Hackworth's memoir About Face (1990), a book critical of the "clerks at the top" directing the U.S.'s involvement in the Vietnam War. He defended Trump's pardons of two Army officers convicted of Uniform Code of Military Justice offenses, Mathew L. Golsteyn and Clint Lorance, and his intervention in the case of Eddie Gallagher, a Navy SEAL involved in a high-profile war crimes case; in an interview with The New York Times in November 2019, Kent compared Gallagher's case with that of Chelsea Manning.

=== Foreign policy ===
At a conference held at Washington Marriott Marquis in April 2022, Kent argued the "political establishment" seeks to initiate a conflict against Russia, including by providing military assistance to Ukraine—a level of support he outright opposed. He stated Russian president Vladimir Putin's demands for Donetsk and Luhansk Oblasts were "very reasonable". His comments on Tucker Carlson Tonight denouncing support for Ukraine as deterring a peace deal were repeated by TASS, a Russian state-owned news agency. In September 2023, Kent described the Biden administration's strategy as immoral, arguing that the U.S. is fueling a prolonged war that is "unsustainable" for Ukraine. Kent has specifically stated that the policy uses the Ukrainian civilian population as "cannon fodder", describing drafted Ukrainian soldiers—whom he characterized as formerly everyday workers and students—as being sent to die in a "muddy ditch" in a war he believed they cannot win. He has argued that by providing continuous aid, the U.S. prevents a necessary, albeit likely painful, peace deal from being brokered.

In 2021, following the U.S. withdrawal from Afghanistan, Kent emerged as a vocal critic of what he described as Washington’s failed "nation-building" strategies. In March 2026, Kent characterized U.S.-Israeli strikes against Iran as a "manufactured" war, arguing they did not serve American interests and risked repeating the "disastrous" mistakes of the Iraq War.

== Electoral history ==
=== 2022 ===
2022 United States House of Representatives primary for Washington's third congressional district
Party	Candidate	Votes	%
Democratic	Marie Gluesenkamp Perez	67,937	31.0
Republican	Joe Kent	49,887	25.4
Republican	Jaime Herrera Beutler	48,828	22.3
Republican	Heidi St. John	35,054	16.0
Republican	Vicki Kraft	7,012	3.2
Democratic	Davy Ray	4,853	2.2
Independent	Chris Byrd	3,785	1.7
Republican	Leslie French	1,091	0.5
American Solidarity	Oliver Black	451	0.2
Total votes		218,898	100.0

2022 United States House of Representatives election for Washington's third congressional district
Party	Candidate	Votes	%
Democratic	Marie Gluesenkamp Perez	160,323	50.41
Republican	Joe Kent	157,690	49.59
Total votes		318,013	100.0

=== 2024 ===
2024 United States House of Representatives primary for Washington's third congressional district
Party	Candidate	Votes	%
Democratic	Marie Gluesenkamp Perez	97,274	45.9
Republican	Joe Kent	83,389	39.3
Republican	Leslie Lewallen	25,868	12.2
Independent	John Saulie-Rohman	5,406	2.6
Total votes		211,937	100.0

2024 United States House of Representatives election for Washington's third congressional district
Party	Candidate	Votes	%
Democratic	Marie Gluesenkamp Perez	215,177	51.9
Republican	Joe Kent	199,054	48.1
Total votes		414,231	100.0

== Works cited ==
=== Articles ===
- Allam, Hannah (March 19, 2022). "Building on anti-mask activism, far-right groups pivot from mandates to midterms". The Washington Post.
- Barnes, Julian; Haberman, Maggie; Savage, Charlie (May 16, 2025). "Trump Appointee Pressed Analyst to Redo Intelligence on Venezuelan Gang". The New York Times. Archived from the original on May 20, 2025.
- Barnes, Julian; Haberman, Maggie; Barrett, Devlin (October 28, 2025). "Official's Access to F.B.I. Files in Charlie Kirk Case Drew Pushback". The New York Times. Archived from the original on October 28, 2025.
- Brooks, Taylor (July 31, 2025). "Senate Confirms Joseph Kent as National Counterterrorism Center Director". ExecutiveGov.
- Brunner, Jim (February 27, 2021). "After impeachment vote, Rep. Herrera Beutler draws pro-Trump challengers". The Seattle Times. Archived from the original on May 22, 2025.
- Brunner, Jim (July 17, 2021). "Rep. Herrera Beutler challenger Joe Kent leads in fundraising among pro-Trump rivals". The Seattle Times.
- Brunner, Jim (September 1, 2021). "Trump endorses Joe Kent, Republican challenger to Rep. Jaime Herrera Beutler, who voted for impeachment". The Seattle Times. Archived from the original on May 22, 2025.
- Brunner, Jim; Takahama, Elisa (January 12, 2022). "Protesters descend on WA Board of Health after misinformation about vaccine plans goes viral". The Seattle Times.
- Brunner, Jim (April 11, 2022). "In Southwest WA, a far-right clash tests power of Trump's endorsement in race for Congress". The Seattle Times.
- Brunner, Jim (August 9, 2022). "Rep. Jaime Herrera Beutler concedes primary defeat to Trump-endorsed challenger Joe Kent". The Seattle Times.
- Brunner, Jim (August 16, 2022). "In race for Herrera Beutler's seat, Marie Gluesenkamp Perez focuses on Democratic and Republican voters". The Seattle Times. Archived from the original on May 22, 2025.
- Brunner, Jim (October 11, 2022). "Some Republicans buck party, backing Marie Gluesenkamp Perez for Congress vs. Joe Kent". The Seattle Times. Archived from the original on May 22, 2025.
- Brunner, Jim (April 10, 2025). "Joe Kent defends Signal chat, repeats Jan. 6 conspiracy at Senate hearing". The Seattle Times. Archived from the original on May 21, 2025.
- Brynelson, Troy (November 29, 2021). "Republican Joe Kent faces 'the establishment' and his own party in long-odds congressional bid". Oregon Public Broadcasting.
- Brynelson, Troy (March 7, 2022). "Congressional candidate Joe Kent distances from white nationalist amid social media spat". Oregon Public Broadcasting. Archived from the original on October 18, 2022.
- Brynelson, Troy (November 14, 2022). "Facing defeat, Joe Kent campaign looks to 'cure' challenged ballots". Oregon Public Broadcasting. Archived from the original on November 16, 2022.
- Brynelson, Troy (October 26, 2023). "Federal panel dismisses claims questioning Joe Kent's job". Oregon Public Broadcasting. Archived from the original on February 22, 2024.
- Cornfield, Jerry (October 16, 2024). "Gluesenkamp Perez and Kent spar as poll shows rematch is a dead heat". Washington State Standard. Oregon Public Broadcasting.
- Cornfield, Jerry (October 23, 2024). "Joe Kent doesn't like the I-5 bridge project. Could he change it if he's in Congress?". Washington State Standard.
- Cornfield, Jerry (February 3, 2025). "Trump names Washington's Joe Kent to lead counterterrorism agency". Washington State Standard. Archived from the original on May 10, 2025.
- Dent, Alec (October 14, 2022). "The Right's Quiet Uncanceling of a Dead White Supremacist". Vanity Fair.
- Ellenbecker, Lauren (January 11, 2023). "Joe Kent to run for 3rd District seat in 2024". The Columbian. Archived from the original on August 13, 2025.
- Fertig, Natalie (November 9, 2024). "Democrat Marie Gluesenkamp Perez wins Washington state rematch". Politico. Archived from the original on May 6, 2025.
- Feuer, Alan (August 9, 2022). "F.B.I. Search Ignited Violent Rhetoric on the Far Right". The New York Times. Archived from the original on August 11, 2022.
- "GOP's Joe Kent concedes Washington state Congressional race". Associated Press. December 21, 2022. Archived from the original on January 14, 2023.
- Gutman, David (September 28, 2022). "In WA congressional debate, Joe Kent mocks vaccines, Marie Gluesenkamp Perez calls him extremist". The Seattle Times. Archived from the original on May 23, 2025.
- Hair, Calley (February 22, 2021). "Heidi St. John among Republicans challenging Herrera Beutler for 3rd District seat". The Columbian. Archived from the original on July 22, 2025.
- Hair, Calley (March 19, 2021). "Washougal woman running for 3rd District on 'anti-authoritarian' platform". The Columbian.
- Heilbrunn, Jacob (April 2, 2022). "Trumpian Conservatives Hold an 'Emergency' Meeting Over Russia". Politico Magazine. Archived from the original on June 25, 2025.
- Homans, Charles (May 16, 2023). "Without Tucker Carlson, Far Right Loses a Foothold in the Mainstream". The New York Times.
- Karni, Annie (November 12, 2022). "Perez, a Democrat, Wins in Washington, Picking Up a Competitive House Seat". The New York Times.
- Karni, Annie (March 3, 2024). "Aging Bridge Is a Flashpoint in Competitive Washington State House Race". The New York Times.
- Karni, Annie; Edmondson, Catie (September 27, 2024). "G.O.P. Candidates, Looking to Soften Their Image, Turn to Their Wives". The New York Times. Archived from the original on May 22, 2025.
- Karni, Annie (October 16, 2024). "In Race for Congress, Republican Election Deniers and Skeptics Seek Swing Seats". The New York Times.
- Kaczynski, Andrew; Steck, Em (September 30, 2022). "GOP congressional candidate Joe Kent's ties to white nationalists include interview with Nazi sympathizer". CNN.
- Kent, Joe (September 18, 2023). "U.S. position cruel, irresponsible". The Columbian.
- Kim, Seung Min; Klepper, David (March 17, 2026). "Top counterterrorism official Kent resigns over Trump's Iran war, says Iran posed no imminent threat". Associated Press.
- Klepper, David (March 18, 2026). "Ex-counterterrorism official says he wasn't allowed to share concerns about Iran war with Trump". Associated Press.
- Knowles, Hannah; Sotomayor, Marianna; Itkowitz, Colby (November 16, 2022). "Republicans narrowly win House, ending full Democratic control of Congress". The Washington Post.
- La Corte, Rachel (October 12, 2022). "Washington House seat in play amid increased polarization". Associated Press. Archived from the original on October 18, 2022.
- Lamothe, Dan (March 22, 2026). "Joe Kent says he wants Trump to hear MAGA opposition to Iran war". The Washington Post.
- Lanard, Noah (October 5, 2022). "Joe Kent's Forever War". Mother Jones. Archived from the original on October 18, 2022.
- Messerly, Megan (March 19, 2026). "The GOP is dismissing Joe Kent. They might come to regret it". Politico.
- Minsberg, Talya (March 25, 2025). "Who Was in the Signal Group Chat?". The New York Times. Archived from the original on May 11, 2025.
- Mutnick, Ally; Ferris, Sarah; Schneider, Elena (November 15, 2022). "'The weirdest election I've ever been a part of': How the GOP almost blew the House". Politico. Archived from the original on August 14, 2025.
- Mutnick, Ally; Shepard, Steven (April 24, 2024). "Why narrow majorities and House gridlock are here to stay in 2024". Politico. Archived from the original on May 22, 2025.
- Nakashima, Ellen; Silverman, Ellie (March 21, 2025). "Counterterror nominee and Jan. 6 denier working as Gabbard's top aide". The Washington Post. Archived from the original on March 25, 2025.
- Oppel, Richard (February 8, 2019). "Her Title: Cryptologic Technician. Her Occupation: Warrior". The New York Times. Archived from the original on May 31, 2025.
- Philipps, Dave; Oppel, Richard; Arango, Tim (November 25, 2019). "How SEALs and Veterans View the Trump-Navy Tussle Over Gallagher". The New York Times. Archived from the original on May 22, 2025.
- Rosenfeld, Arno (March 17, 2026). "Joe Kent, Trump official with white supremacist ties, resigns over Iran war and blames Israel". The Forward.
- Ryan, Missy (March 22, 2019). "War Torn". The Washington Post. Archived from the original on April 9, 2023.
- Schmitt, Eric (July 30, 2025). "Senate Approves Trump's Pick for Top Counterterrorism Post". The New York Times. Archived from the original on July 31, 2025.
- Slodysko, Brian (July 26, 2022). "GOP's links to extremism surface in congressional primary". Associated Press. Archived from the original on September 2, 2022.
- Stepansky, Joseph (March 17, 2026). "US National Counterterrorism Center director Joe Kent resigns over Iran war". Al Jazeera.
- Talcott, Shelby (March 18, 2026). "FBI investigates intelligence aide who resigned over war". Semafor.
- Thompson, Stuart (April 15, 2022). "How Russian Media Uses Fox News to Make Its Case". The New York Times. Archived from the original on May 22, 2025.
- "Trump nominates Joe Kent as director of National Counter Terrorism Center". Oregon Public Broadcasting. February 3, 2025. Archived from the original on May 22, 2025.
- Volz, Dustin; Dawsey, Josh; McGraw, Meridith (March 17, 2026). "Trump's Advisers Circle the Wagons as Signs of Dissent Over Iran Emerge". The Wall Street Journal.
- "Washington 3rd Congressional District Primary Election Results". The New York Times. August 6, 2024. Archived from the original on May 22, 2025.
- "Washington Third Congressional District Election Results". The New York Times. November 8, 2022. Archived from the original on May 22, 2025.
- "Washington Third Congressional District Election Results". The New York Times. November 5, 2024. Archived from the original on May 22, 2025.
- "Washington Third Congressional District Primary Election Results". The New York Times. August 2, 2022. Archived from the original on May 23, 2025.
- Weisman, Jonathan; Rosenberg, Matthew (September 18, 2021). "Sparse Right-Wing Protest of Jan. 6 Arrests Draws Huge Police Response". The New York Times. Archived from the original on May 22, 2025.
- Weisman, Jonathan; Broadwater, Luke (January 5, 2022). "A Long, Hard Year for Republicans Who Voted to Impeach After Jan. 6". The New York Times. Archived from the original on May 22, 2025.
- Weisman, Jonathan (September 8, 2022). "Why a Narrow, Hard-Right G.O.P. House Majority Could Spell Chaos". The New York Times. Archived from the original on February 26, 2023.
- Weisman, Jonathan (October 15, 2022). "New Generation of Combat Vets, Eyeing House, Strike From the Right". The New York Times. Archived from the original on October 17, 2022.
- Wilson, Jason (February 5, 2025). "Trump's pick for key national security position linked to far-right figures". The Guardian.
- Yaw, Claudia (September 7, 2021). "Joe Kent rides waves of endorsements at rally with Matt Gaetz". The Reflector. Archived from the original on November 16, 2022.

=== Documents ===
- "Joseph C Kent in the U.S., Public Records Index, 1950-1993, Volume 2" (Document). Public Records Index.
- "Joseph Clay Kent in the U.S., Index to Public Records, 1994-2019" (Document). Index to Public Records.
