= 2022 United States House of Representatives elections in Washington =

- November 8, 2022

All 10 Washington seats to the United States House of Representatives
	Majority party	Minority party
Party	Democratic	Republican
Seats before	7	3
Seats after	8	2
Seat change	▲1	▼1
Popular vote	1,751,591	1,261,966
Percentage	57.91%	41.73%
Swing	▼1.43%	▲2.55%

Democratic hold Democratic gain
Republican hold
Democratic
50–60%
60–70%
70–80%
80–90%
Republican
50–60%
60–70%
70–80%
80–90%

The 2022 United States House of Representatives elections in Washington were held on November 8, 2022, to elect the 10 U.S. representatives from the state of Washington, one from each of the state's 10 congressional districts. The elections coincided with other elections to the House of Representatives, elections to the United States Senate and various state and local elections. Going into this election, the Democratic Party represented seven seats, while the Republican Party represented three seats.

These were the first elections to the House of Representatives held in Washington state after the 2020 redistricting cycle. The Democratic Party gained a seat, flipping the 3rd district from Republican to Democratic control, and reducing the Republicans' share of the delegation to just two districts.

== Redistricting ==
=== Process ===
Washington state has used a bipartisan redistricting commission to draw its districts since the passage of a ballot initiative in 1983. The Democratic and Republican parties each appoint two people to the commission, and the four appointees select a fifth member to serve as the nonvoting chair of the commission. For the 2020 redistricting cycle, the Democrats appointed April Sims, secretary-treasurer of the Washington State Labor Council, and Brady Piñero Walkinshaw, CEO of Grist and a former member of the Washington House of Representatives. The Republicans chose Paul Graves, a lawyer and former member of the Washington House of Representatives, and Joe Fain, president and CEO of the Bellevue Chamber of Commerce and a former member of the Washington Senate. They selected Sarah Augustine, executive director of the Dispute Resolution Center for Yakima and Kittitas counties, as chair.

=== Failure of the commission ===
The commission was required to approve a final set of district maps by 11:59 PM on November 15, 2021. However, for the first time since the process was enacted in 1983, the deadline was not met. Although the commission approved a set of maps with seconds to go before midnight, they did not vote to transmit those maps until after the deadline had passed. The members of the commission faced widespread criticism for missing the deadline and for making negotiations behind closed doors rather than in front of the public. Some speculated that the actions of the commission may have violated Washington's Open Public Meetings Act, which generally prohibits public commissions from making decisions in private, and the Washington Supreme Court demanded that the redistricting commission produce a detailed timeline of what occurred in the hours before the deadline. Because the commission failed to meet the deadline, the Washington Supreme Court took over responsibility for the state's maps.

Several Washington politicians expressed disappointment that the commission failed and that the supreme court would be drawing the state's maps. Republican former state senator Ann Rivers claimed that it was "fair to wonder" if some members of the commission wanted to miss the deadline so that the majority-liberal supreme court could take over redistricting. The League of Women Voters called for the entire process to be reformed, believing it should be more transparent and that the commissioners should be given more time and training. Washington Senate Majority Leader Andy Billig said his caucus would introduce legislation to require that the final version of the commission's map be released to the public before the final vote to prevent future commissions from missing the deadline.

=== Supreme Court ===
Some speculated that maps drawn by the supreme court may have been more favorable to the Democratic Party compared to those drawn by the bipartisan commission, as five out of the court's nine justices were originally appointed by Democratic governors (three by Jay Inslee and two by Christine Gregoire). The members of the commission urged the supreme court to adopt the maps that it drew but did not approve in time. However, commissioner Walkinshaw acknowledged that there may be questions about whether the maps' handling of the Yakima River Valley may have violated the Voting Rights Act due to its distribution of Latinos. The UCLA Voting Rights Project claimed that the maps demonstrated "racially polarized voting patterns" in the region and urged the supreme court to address these issues. The supreme court granted the commission's request and adopted its maps, but it emphasized that its decision to use the commission's maps "does not render any opinion on the plan's compliance with any statutory and constitutional requirements," meaning that the maps could still be challenged in court.

=== New maps ===
Washington's new congressional map leaves the districts largely the same, though it makes the 1st and 10th districts somewhat more liberal. The most notable change was to the 1st district, which previously reached up to the Canada–United States border. Under the new map, it is more compact, with Medina and Bellevue in the south and Arlington in the north. Much of the areas cut out from the 1st district were added to the 2nd district. Previously a primarily coastal district, the 2nd now reaches further inland, taking in Skagit and Whatcom counties. The 8th district was also extended. It now reaches into Snohomish County, taking in the city of Sultan, and northern King County, taking in the city of Skykomish. Although both Snohomish and King are liberal counties, giving 58.5% and 75.0% of their vote respectively to Democrat Joe Biden in the 2020 presidential election, the portions of these counties that are inside the 8th are still notably more conservative than the counties as a whole. This, in addition to the presence of Trump-supporting Chelan and Kittitas counties and a portion of Pierce County, makes the district highly competitive.

== Overview ==
=== District ===
District	Democratic		Republican		Others		Total		Result
District	Votes	%	Votes	%	Votes	%	Votes	%	Result
District 1	181,992	63.48%	104,329	36.39%	363	0.13%	286,684	100.00%	Democratic hold
District 2	202,980	60.07%	134,335	39.75%	608	0.18%	337,923	100.00%	Democratic hold
District 3	160,323	50.41%	157,690	49.59%	0	0.00%	318,013	100.00%	Democratic gain
District 4	70,710	31.20%	150,619	66.46%	5,318	2.35%	226,647	100.00%	Republican hold
District 5	127,585	40.25%	188,648	59.51%	773	0.24%	317,006	100.00%	Republican hold
District 6	208,710	60.00%	138,754	39.89%	409	0.12%	347,873	100.00%	Democratic hold
District 7	295,998	85.39%	49,207	14.20%	1,442	0.42%	346,647	100.00%	Democratic hold
District 8	179,003	53.27%	155,976	46.42%	1,059	0.32%	336,038	100.00%	Democratic hold
District 9	171,746	71.61%	67,631	28.20%	471	0.20%	239,848	100.00%	Democratic hold
District 10	152,544	56.97%	114,777	42.87%	427	0.16%	267,748	100.00%	Democratic hold
Total	1,751,591	57.91%	1,261,966	41.73%	10,870	0.36%	3,024,427	100.00%	

Popular vote
Democratic	57.91%
Republican	41.73%
Other	0.36%

House seats
Democratic	80.00%
Republican	20.00%

== District 1 ==
2022 Washington's 1st congressional district election
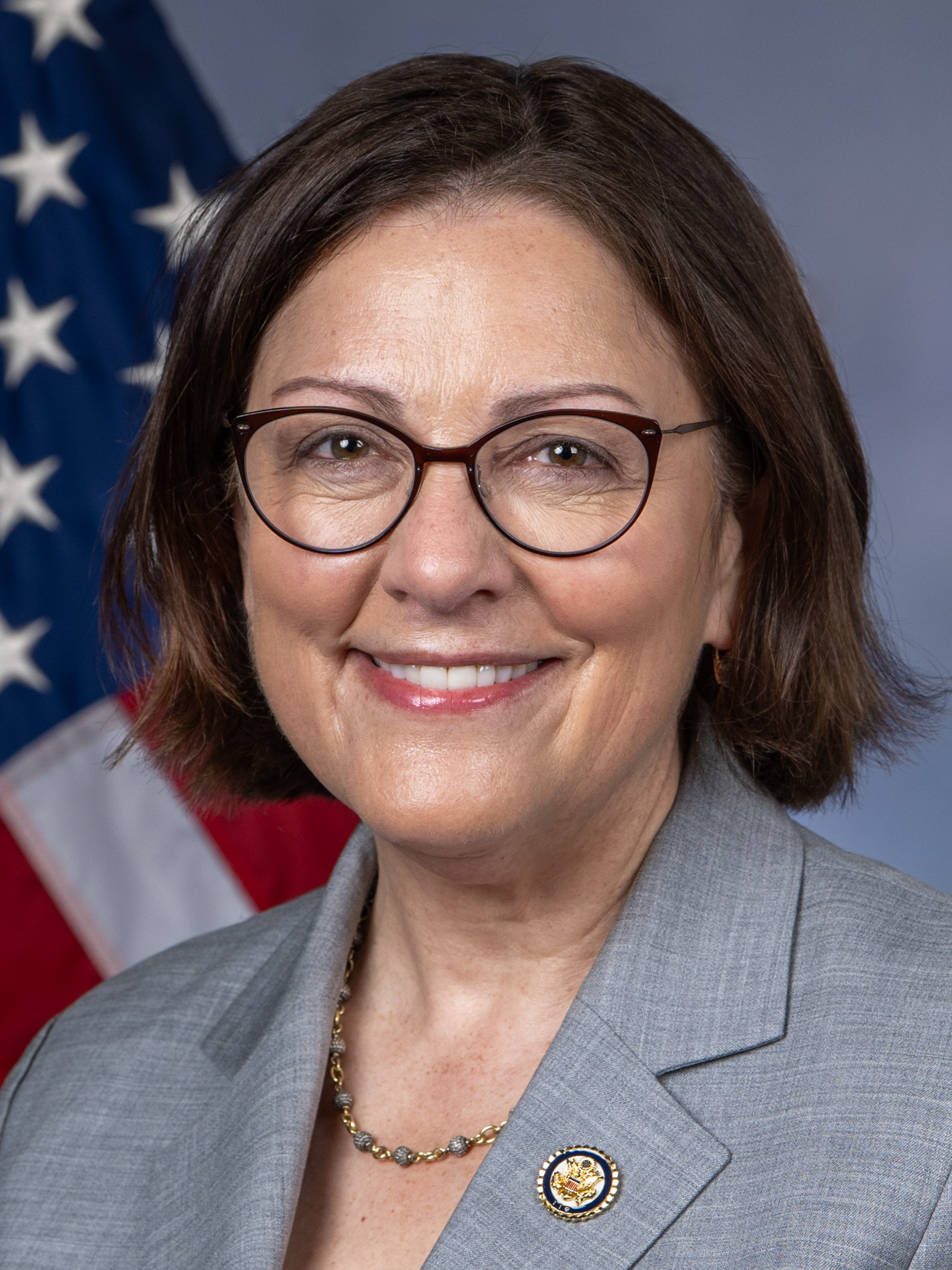

Candidate	Suzan DelBene	Vincent Cavaleri
Party	Democratic	Republican
Popular vote	181,992	104,329
Percentage	63.5%	36.4%
- DelBene: 50–60% 60–70% 70–80% 80–90% >90% Cavaleri: 40–50% 50–60% 60–70% 70–80% 80–90% >90% Tie: 50% No data
U.S. Representative before election
Suzan DelBene
Democratic
Elected U.S. Representative
Suzan DelBene
Democratic

Before redistricting, the 1st congressional district spanned the northeastern Seattle suburbs, including Redmond and Kirkland, along the Cascades to the Canada–United States border. The incumbent was Democrat Suzan DelBene, who was first elected to the 1st district in 2012. DelBene ran for re-election to a sixth full term in 2022 and won the general election with 63.5% of the vote.

=== Primary election ===
==== Candidates ====
===== Advanced to general =====
- Vincent Cavaleri (Republican), Mill Creek city councilor and Snohomish County Sheriff's deputy
- Suzan DelBene (Democratic), incumbent U.S. Representative and Chair of the New Democrat Coalition

===== Eliminated in primary =====
- Derek Chartrand (Republican), sales executive and candidate for this seat in 2020
- Matthew Heines (Republican), educator and candidate for this seat in 2020
- Tom Spears (Independent), petroleum landman and U.S. Marine Corps veteran

==== Endorsements ====
Vincent Cavaleri (R)

Organizations

- King County Republican Party
Susan DelBene (D)

Organizations

- King County Democratic Party
- League of Conservation Voters
- National Women's Political Caucus of Washington
- Sierra Club

Labor unions

- Service Employees International Union Local 775

Newspapers

- The Stranger

==== Results ====
Results by county DelBene: 50–60% 70–80%

Blanket primary results
Party	Candidate	Votes	%
Democratic	Suzan DelBene (incumbent)	102,857	62.0
Republican	Vincent Cavaleri	32,998	19.9
Republican	Matthew Heines	13,634	8.2
Republican	Derek Chartrand	11,536	7.0
Independent	Tom Spears	4,840	2.9
Total votes		165,865	100.0

=== General election ===
==== Predictions ====
Source	Ranking	As of
The Cook Political Report	Solid D	February 10, 2022
Inside Elections	Solid D	March 31, 2022
Sabato's Crystal Ball	Safe D	February 16, 2022
Politico	Solid D	April 5, 2022
RCP	Safe D	June 9, 2022
Fox News	Solid D	July 11, 2022
DDHQ	Solid D	July 20, 2022
538	Solid D	June 30, 2022
The Economist	Safe D	September 28, 2022

==== Results ====
2022 Washington's 1st congressional district election
Party	Candidate	Votes	%
Democratic	Suzan DelBene (incumbent)	181,992	63.5
Republican	Vincent Cavaleri	104,329	36.4
Write-in		363	0.1
Total votes		286,684	100.0
Democratic hold			

==== By county ====
County results
County	Suzan DelBene Democratic		Vincent Cavaleri Republican		Write-in Various		Margin		Total votes
County	#	%	#	%	#	%	#	%	Total votes
King (part)	81,233	72.44%	30,778	27.44%	134	0.12%	50,455	44.99%	112,145
Snohomish (part)	100,759	57.73%	73,551	42.14%	229	0.13%	27,208	15.59%	174,539
Totals	181,992	63.48%	104,329	36.39%	363	0.13%	77,663	27.09%	286,684

== District 2 ==
2022 Washington's 2nd congressional district election
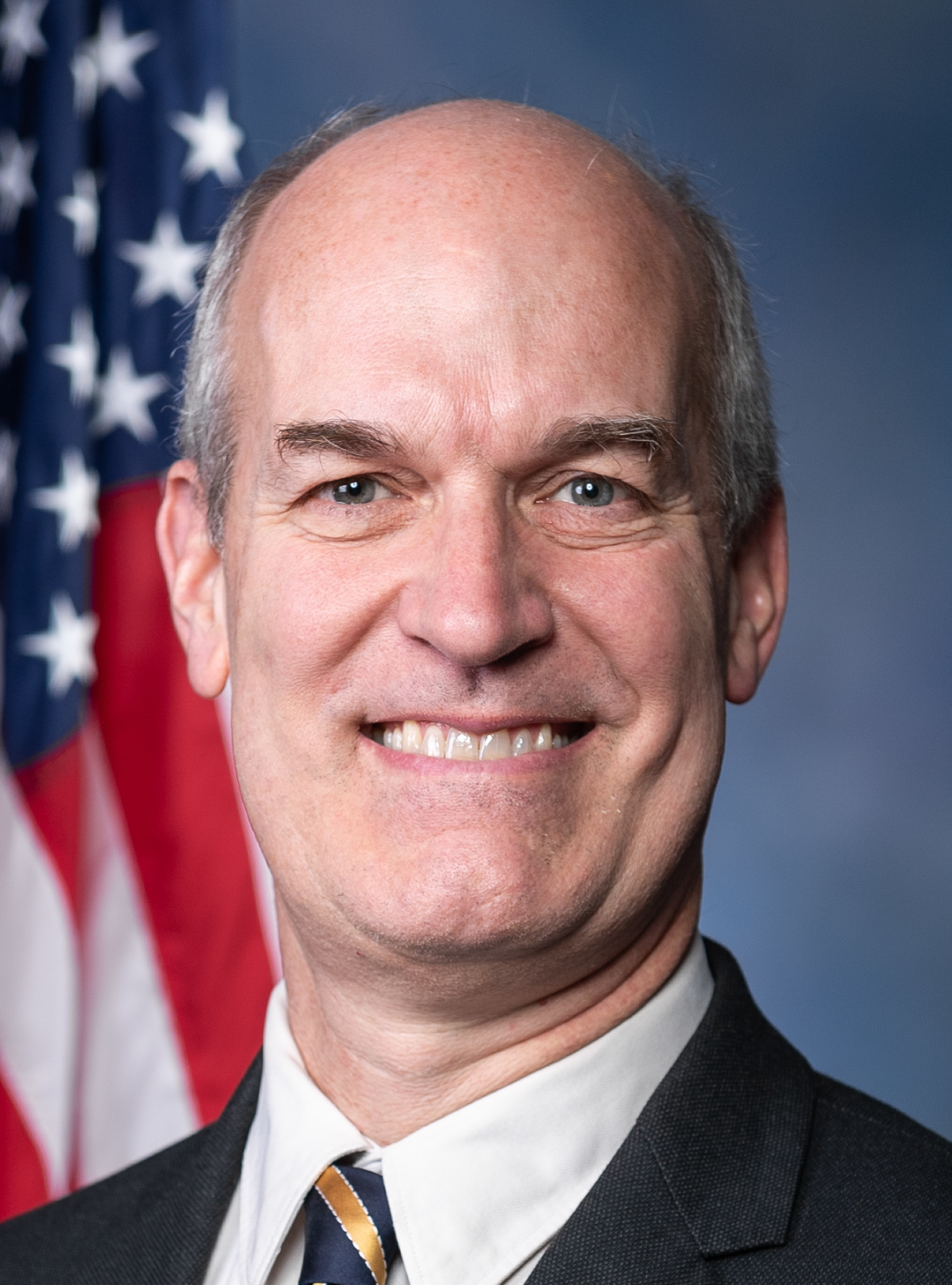

Candidate	Rick Larsen	Dan Matthews
Party	Democratic	Republican
Popular vote	202,980	134,335
Percentage	60.1%	39.8%
- Larsen: 50–60% 60–70% 70–80% 80–90% >90% Matthews 40–50% 50–60% 60–70% 70–80% 80–90% >90% Tie: 50% No data
U.S. Representative before election
Rick Larsen
Democratic
Elected U.S. Representative
Rick Larsen
Democratic

Before redistricting, the 2nd congressional district encompassed the northern Puget Sound area, including Everett and Bellingham. The incumbent was Democrat Rick Larsen, who had represented the 2nd district since 2001. Larsen most recently ran for re-election in 2022, winning 60.2% of the vote in the general election.

=== Primary election ===
==== Candidates ====
===== Advanced to general =====
- Rick Larsen (Democratic), incumbent U.S. Representative
- Dan Matthews (Republican)

===== Eliminated in primary =====
- Jason Call (Democratic), teacher and candidate for this district in 2020
- Cody Hart (Republican), engineering firm owner, U.S. Navy veteran, and candidate for this district in 2020
- Leif Johnson (Republican), businessman
- Carrie Kennedy (Republican), conservative activist and candidate for this district in 2020
- Jon Welch (Republican)
- Bill Wheeler (Republican), businessman, U.S. Air Force veteran, and write-in candidate for Everett Mayor in 2021

==== Endorsements ====
Jason Call (D)

Individuals

- Marianne Williamson, political activist and columnist for Newsweek, candidate for California's 33rd congressional district in 2014 and for President of the United States in 2020 and 2024

Organizations

- Progressive Democrats of America
Rick Larsen (D)

Organizations

- League of Conservation Voters Action Fund
- Planned Parenthood Action Fund
- Sierra Club

Labor unions

- National Education Association
- Service Employees International Union Local 775

==== Results ====
Results by county Larsen: 40–50% 50–60%

Blanket primary results
Party	Candidate	Votes	%
Democratic	Rick Larsen (incumbent)	100,631	45.8
Republican	Dan Matthews	37,393	17.0
Democratic	Jason Call	31,991	14.6
Republican	Cody Hart	22,176	10.1
Republican	Bill Wheeler	9,124	4.2
Republican	Carrie Kennedy	8,802	4.1
Republican	Leif Johnson	5,582	2.5
Republican	Jon Welch	1,699	0.8
Republican	Brandon Stalnaker	1,366	0.6
Independent	Doug Revelle	927	0.4
Total votes		219,691	100.0

=== General election ===
==== Predictions ====
Source	Ranking	As of
The Cook Political Report	Solid D	February 10, 2022
Inside Elections	Solid D	March 31, 2022
Sabato's Crystal Ball	Safe D	February 16, 2022
Politico	Solid D	April 5, 2022
RCP	Safe D	June 9, 2022
Fox News	Solid D	July 11, 2022
DDHQ	Solid D	July 20, 2022
538	Solid D	August 19, 2022
The Economist	Safe D	September 28, 2022

==== Results ====
2022 Washington's 2nd congressional district election
Party	Candidate	Votes	%
Democratic	Rick Larsen (incumbent)	202,980	60.1
Republican	Dan Matthews	134,335	39.8
Write-in		608	0.2
Total votes		337,923	100.0
Democratic hold			

==== By county ====
County results
County	Rick Larsen Democratic		Dan Matthews Republican		Write-in Various		Margin		Total votes
County	#	%	#	%	#	%	#	%	Total votes
Island	24,242	56.42%	18,654	43.41%	73	0.17%	5,588	13.00%	42,969
San Juan	8,322	73.96%	2,912	25.88%	18	0.16%	5,410	48.08%	11,252
Skagit	30,124	53.12%	26,510	46.75%	76	0.13%	3,614	6.37%	56,710
Snohomish (part)	73,494	63.18%	42,596	36.62%	228	0.20%	30,898	26.56%	116,318
Whatcom	66,798	60.36%	43,663	39.45%	213	0.19%	23,135	20.90%	110,674
Totals	202,980	60.07%	134,335	39.75%	608	0.18%	68,645	20.31%	337,923

== District 3 ==
2022 Washington's 3rd congressional district election
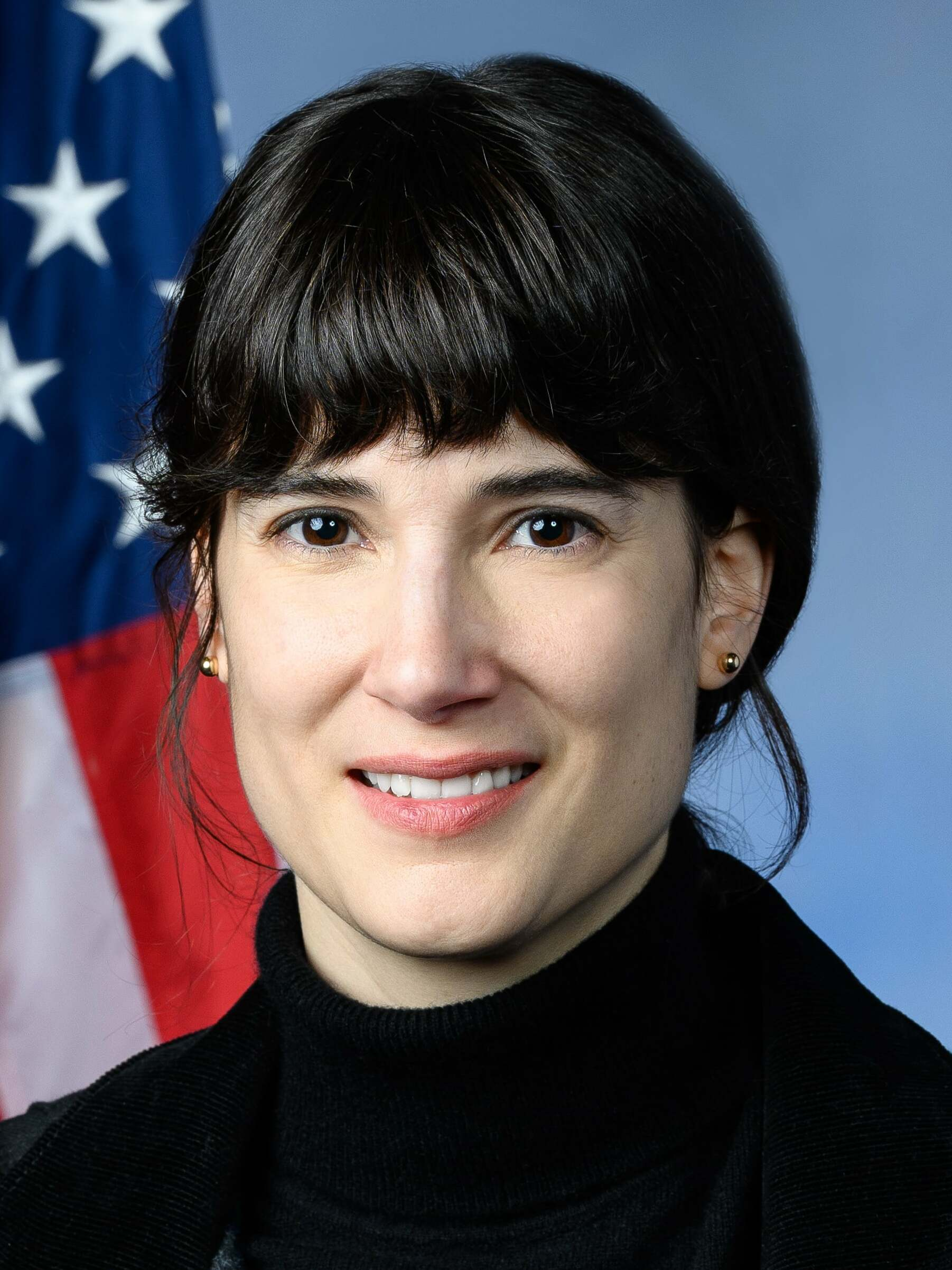

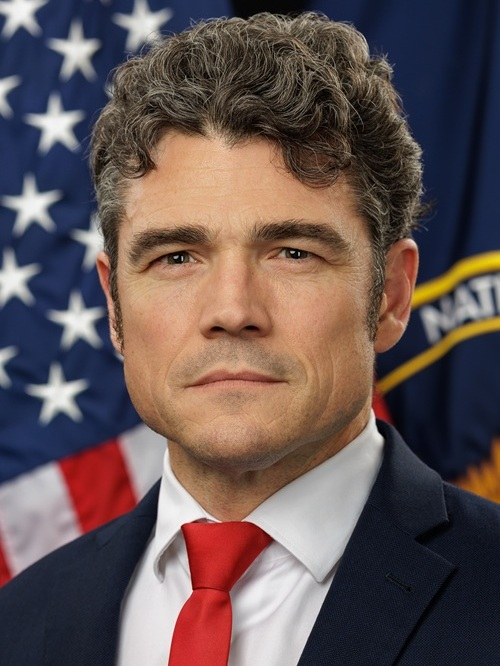
Candidate	Marie Gluesenkamp Perez	Joe Kent
Party	Democratic	Republican
Popular vote	160,323	157,690
Percentage	50.4%	49.6%
- Gluesenkamp Perez: 50–60% 60–70% 70–80% 80–90% Kent: 40–50% 50–60% 60–70% 70–80% 80–90% >90% Tie: 40–50% 50% No data
U.S. Representative before election
Jaime Herrera Beutler
Republican
Elected U.S. Representative
Marie Gluesenkamp Perez
Democratic

Before redistricting, the 3rd district encompassed the southernmost portion of western and central Washington. It included the counties of Lewis, Pacific, Wahkiakum, Cowlitz, Clark, Skamania, and Klickitat, as well as a small sliver of southern Thurston county. The incumbent was Republican Jaime Herrera Beutler, who was re-elected with 56.4% of the vote in 2020, but was eliminated in the primary; as one of the ten Republican representatives to vote for Donald Trump's second impeachment, her primary opponent was endorsed by Trump. Beutler was the first incumbent U.S. Representative from Washington to fail to advance to the general election since the introduction of the top-two primary system in 2008.

Despite every major election predictor predicting this race to be "Lean R" or better for Republicans, the race was won by Democrat Marie Gluesenkamp Perez by a small margin. The race has been called a microcosm of many of those across the U.S., with a far-right challenger to the incumbent being defeated in the general election with election denial and abortion rights being major issues. Other issues include the expansion of mass transit into WA-3. Kent was opposed to it while Perez supported it.

=== Primary election ===
==== Candidates ====
===== Advanced to general =====
- Joe Kent (Republican), technology project manager, former U.S. Army chief warrant officer, former Green Beret, and widower of Shannon M. Kent
- Marie Gluesenkamp Perez (Democratic), small business owner

===== Eliminated in primary =====
- Oliver Black (American Solidarity)
- Chris Byrd (independent)
- Leslie French (Republican), businessman
- Jaime Herrera Beutler (Republican), incumbent U.S. Representative
- Vicki Kraft (Republican), state representative from the 17th district
- Davy Ray (Democratic), college instructor, retired musician, and candidate for this district in 2020
- Heidi St. John (Republican), author and speaker

===== Withdrew =====
- Brent Hennrich (Democratic), installation site supervisor (endorsed Gluesenkamp Perez)
- Lucy Lauser (Democratic), artist, musician, and Skamania delegate for Bernie Sanders in 2016
- Christopher Maynard (Democratic), business owner (endorsed Hennrich)
- Wadi Yakhour (Republican), former special assistant to the U.S. Department of the Interior and U.S. Navy veteran

==== Endorsements ====
Jaime Herrera Beutler (R)

U.S. Executive Branch officials

- Miles Taylor, former chief of staff to the U.S. Secretary of Homeland Security (2019)
- Christine Todd Whitman, former administrator of the Environmental Protection Agency (2001–2003) and former governor of New Jersey (1994–2001)

U.S. Representatives

- Kevin McCarthy, U.S. Representative from California's 23rd congressional district (2007–2023) Leader of the House Republican Conference (2019–2023) and Speaker of the house (2023)
- María Elvira Salazar, U.S. Representative from Florida's 27th congressional district (2021–present)
- Steve Scalise, U.S. Representative from Louisiana's 1st congressional district (2008–present)
- Elise Stefanik, U.S. Representative from New York's 21st congressional district (2015–present)
- Joe Walsh, former U.S. Representative from Illinois's 8th congressional district (2011–2013)

Organizations

- Maggie's List
- National Federation of Independent Business
- Pro-Israel America
- Renew America Movement

Newspapers

- The Columbian (co-endorsed with Gluesenkamp Perez)
Joe Kent (R)

U.S. Executive Branch officials

- Michael Flynn, former U.S. National Security Advisor (2017) and former Director of the DIA (2012–2014)
- Christopher C. Miller, acting U.S. Secretary of Defense (2020–2021)
- Donald Trump, 45th president of the United States (2017–2021)

U.S. Representatives

- Andy Biggs, U.S. Representative from Arizona's 5th congressional district (2017–present)
- Madison Cawthorn, U.S. Representative from North Carolina's 11th congressional district (2021–2023)
- Tulsi Gabbard, U.S. Representative from Hawaii's 2nd congressional district (2013–2021) and former vice chair of the DNC (Independent)
- Matt Gaetz, U.S. Representative from Florida's 1st congressional district (2017–2024)
- Paul Gosar, U.S. Representative from Arizona's 4th congressional district (2011–present)
- Ronny Jackson, U.S. Representative from Texas's 13th congressional district (2021–present)
- Troy Nehls, U.S. Representative from Texas's 22nd congressional district (2021–present)

State and local officials

- Neil Amondson, former member of the Washington Senate from 20th district (1989–1995) and former member of the Washington House of Representatives from the 20th District
- Wendy Rogers, member of the Arizona Senate from 6th district (2021-present)
- Anthony Sabatini, member of the Florida House of Representatives from the 32nd District and candidate for Florida's 7th congressional district
- Loren Culp, former Republic police chief, U.S. Army veteran, candidate for Washington's 4th congressional district and 2020 nominee for Governor of Washington

Organizations

- Latinos for America First PAC
- New York Young Republican Club
- Republicans for National Renewal
- Thurston County Republican Party
- Turning Point Action PAC
- Skamania County Republican Party
- Wahkiakum County Republican Party

Individuals

- Morton Blackwell, president of the Leadership Institute (1979—present) and American conservative activist
- Tucker Carlson, conservative political commentator and host of Tucker Carlson Tonight
- Jenna Ellis, lawyer
Marie Gluesenkamp Perez (D)

U.S. Representatives

- Suzan DelBene, U.S. Representative from Washington's 1st congressional district (2012–present)
- Pramila Jayapal, U.S. Representative from Washington's 7th congressional district (2017–present), and chair of the Congressional Progressive Caucus

Organizations

- League of Conservation Voters
- National Women's Political Caucus of Washington
- Planned Parenthood
- Sierra Club

Labor unions

- Service Employees International Union Local 775
- Washington AFL–CIO

Newspapers

- The Columbian (co-endorsed with Beutler)
Heidi St. John (R)

Organizations

- Eagle Forum

==== Polling ====
Poll source	Date(s) administered	Sample size (Note: Key: A – all adults RV – registered voters LV – likely voters V – unclear)	Margin of error	Brent Hennrich (D)	Jaime Herrera Beutler (R)	Joe Kent (R)	Vicki Kraft (R)	Marie Gluesenkamp Perez (D)	Heidi St. John (R)	Other	Undecided
	May 20, 2022	Hennrich withdrew from the race and endorsed Gluesenkamp Perez									
The Trafalgar Group (R)	May 18–20, 2022	645 (LV)	± 3.8%	12%	22%	28%	3%	6%	9%	0% (Note: Ray with 0%)	20%
The Trafalgar Group (R)	February 11–14, 2022	697 (LV)	± 3.7%	33%	22%	26%	5%	–	12%	–	3%
The Trafalgar Group (R)	October 30 – November 1, 2021	682 (LV)	± 3.7%	25%	23%	31%	–	–	10%	10% (Note: "Other Democrat" with 6%, Wouldn't vote with 4%)	2%

Hypothetical polling

Poll source	Date(s) administered	Sample size	Margin of error	Brent Hennrich (D)	Jaime Herrera Beutler (R)	Chris Jenkins (D)	Joe Kent (R)	Lucy Lauser (D)	Matthew Overton (R)	Heidi St. John (R)	Other	Undecided
The Trafalgar Group (R)	June 5–7, 2021	841 (LV)	± 3.3%	13%	30%	3%	23%	7%	2%	13%	0% (Note: Yakhour with 0%)	8%

==== Debate ====
2022 Washington's 3rd congressional district blanket primary debate
No.	Date	Host	Moderator	Link	Democratic	Republican	Republican
Key: P Participant A Absent N Not invited I Invited W Withdrawn							
Key: P Participant A Absent N Not invited I Invited W Withdrawn					Marie Gluesenkamp Perez	Jaime Herrera Beutler	Joe Kent
1	Jul. 27, 2022	Oregon Public Broadcasting	Dave Miller		P	P	P

==== Results ====
Results by county Gluesenkamp Perez: 20–30%; 30–40%; Kent: 30–40%; Herrera Beutler: 20–30%

Blanket primary results
Party	Candidate	Votes	%
Democratic	Marie Gluesenkamp Perez	68,190	31.0
Republican	Joe Kent	50,097	22.8
Republican	Jaime Herrera Beutler (incumbent)	49,001	22.3
Republican	Heidi St. John	35,219	16.0
Republican	Vicki Kraft	7,033	3.2
Democratic	Davy Ray	4,870	2.2
Independent	Chris Byrd	3,817	1.7
Republican	Leslie French	1,100	0.5
American Solidarity	Oliver Black	456	0.2
Total votes		219,783	100.0

=== General election ===
==== Debate ====
2022 Washington's 3rd congressional district debate
No.	Date	Host	Moderator	Link	Republican	Democratic
Key: P Participant A Absent N Not invited I Invited W Withdrawn						
Key: P Participant A Absent N Not invited I Invited W Withdrawn					Joe Kent	Marie Gluesenkamp Perez
1	Oct. 15, 2022	Leagues of Women Voters of Clark, Cowlitz, Klickitat, Lewis & Skamania counties	Sally Carpenter Hale		P	P
2	Oct. 27, 2022	Oregon Public Broadcasting	Dave Miller		P	P
2	Oct. 28, 2022	KGW	Laural Porter		P	P

==== Predictions ====
Source	Ranking	As of
The Cook Political Report	Lean R	August 10, 2022
Inside Elections	Lean R	October 21, 2022
Sabato's Crystal Ball	Likely R	February 16, 2022
Politico	Lean R	April 5, 2022
RCP	Likely R	August 9, 2022
Fox News	Likely R	October 18, 2022
DDHQ	Likely R	September 20, 2022
538	Solid R	June 30, 2022
The Economist	Likely R	September 28, 2022

==== Polling ====
Poll source	Date(s) administered	Sample size	Margin of error	Joe Kent (R)	Marie Gluesenkamp Perez (D)	Undecided
Public Policy Polling (D) (Note: This poll was sponsored by the Northwest Progressive Institute)	September 19–20, 2022	834 (LV)	± 3.4%	48%	44%	9%
Expedition Strategies (D) (Note: This poll was sponsored by Gluesenkamp Perez's campaign)	August 25–30, 2022	400 (LV)	± 4.9%	45%	47%	8%

==== Results ====
2022 Washington's 3rd congressional district election
Party	Candidate	Votes	%
Democratic	Marie Gluesenkamp Perez	160,323	50.4
Republican	Joe Kent	157,690	49.6
Total votes		318,013	100.0
Democratic gain from Republican			

==== By county ====
County results
County	Joe Kent Republican		Marie Gluesenkamp Perez Democratic		Margin		Total votes
County	#	%	#	%	#	%	Total votes
Clark	90,805	44.56%	112,996	55.44%	22,191	10.89%	203,801
Cowlitz	24,903	55.90%	19,648	44.10%	-5,255	-11.80%	44,551
Lewis	22,981	64.76%	12,507	35.24%	-10,474	-29.51%	35,488
Pacific	5,793	48.92%	6,048	51.08%	255	2.15%	11,841
Skamania	3,280	53.19%	2,887	46.81%	-393	-6.37%	6,167
Thurston (part)	8,512	62.48%	5,112	37.52%	-3,400	-24.96%	13,624
Wahkiakum	1,416	55.73%	1,125	44.27%	-291	-11.45%	2,541
Totals	157,690	49.59%	160,323	50.41%	2,633	0.83%	318,013

== District 4 ==
2022 Washington's 4th congressional district election

Candidate	Dan Newhouse	Doug White
Party	Republican	Democratic
Popular vote	150,619	70,710
Percentage	66.5%	31.2%
- Newhouse: 40–50% 50–60% 60–70% 70–80% 80–90% >90% White 40–50% 50–60% 60–70% 70–80% 80–90% >90% Tie: 40–50% 50% No data
U.S. Representative before election
Dan Newhouse
Republican
Elected U.S. Representative
Dan Newhouse
Republican

Before redistricting, the 4th congressional district encompassed rural central Washington, including Yakima and Tri-Cities area. The incumbent was Republican Dan Newhouse, who had represented the 4th district since 2015. Newhouse was one of ten Republicans in the House to vote to open impeachment proceedings against Donald Trump in his second impeachment trial in the aftermath of the January 6th insurrection. Trump targeted him in the primary and endorsed another GOP candidate, Loren Culp, as a result of Newhouse's vote. Newhouse defeated Culp in the blanket primary and advanced to the general election, which he won by garnering 66.5% of the vote.

=== Primary election ===
==== Candidates ====
===== Advanced to general =====
- Dan Newhouse (Republican), incumbent U.S. Representative
- Doug White (Democratic), farmer

===== Eliminated in primary =====
- Loren Culp (Republican), former Republic police chief, U.S. Army veteran, and nominee for Governor of Washington in 2020
- Benancio Garcia III (Republican), U.S. Army veteran
- Corey Gibson (Republican), business owner
- Brad Klippert (Republican), state representative for the 8th district and candidate for U.S. Senate in 2004 and 2006
- Jacek Kobiesa (Republican), mechanical engineer
- Jerrod Sessler (Republican), former NASCAR driver and U.S. Navy veteran

==== Endorsements ====
Loren Culp (R)

Executive Branch officials

- Donald Trump, 45th president of the United States (2017–2021)
Dan Newhouse (R)

Federal officials

- Dan Crenshaw, Member of the U.S. House of Representatives from Texas's 2nd district

Organizations

- Citizens for Responsible Energy Solutions
- Pro-Israel America
- Renew America Movement
Declined to endorse

Labor unions

- Washington AFL–CIO

==== Polling ====
Poll source	Date(s) administered	Sample size	Margin of error	Dan Newhouse (R)	Loren Culp (R)	Benancio Garcia (R)	Corey Gibson (R)	Brad Klippert (R)	Jerrod Sessler (R)	Doug White (D)	Undecided
Spry Strategies (R) (Note: This poll was sponsored by Culp's campaign)	April 17–20, 2022	720 (LV)	± 3.7%	20%	28%	–	2%	6%	3%	18%	23%
Spry Strategies (R)	December 9–11, 2021	600 (LV)	± 4.0%	16%	30%	2%	1%	8%	2%	15%	26%

==== Results ====
Results by county Newhouse: 20–30%; White: 20–30%; 30–40%; Culp: 30–40%

Blanket primary results
Party	Candidate	Votes	%
Republican	Dan Newhouse (incumbent)	38,331	25.5
Democratic	Doug White	37,760	25.1
Republican	Loren Culp	32,497	21.6
Republican	Jerrod Sessler	18,495	12.3
Republican	Brad Klippert	15,430	10.3
Republican	Corey Gibson	5,080	3.4
Republican	Benancio Garcia III	2,148	1.4
Republican	Jacek Kobiesa	490	0.3
Total votes		150,231	100.0

=== General election ===
==== Predictions ====
Source	Ranking	As of
The Cook Political Report	Solid R	February 10, 2022
Inside Elections	Solid R	March 31, 2022
Sabato's Crystal Ball	Safe R	February 16, 2022
Politico	Solid R	August 12, 2022
RCP	Safe R	June 9, 2022
Fox News	Solid R	July 11, 2022
DDHQ	Solid R	July 20, 2022
538	Solid R	June 30, 2022
The Economist	Safe R	September 28, 2022

==== Polling ====
Hypothetical polling

Poll source	Date(s) administered	Sample size	Margin of error	Dan Newhouse (R)	Loren Culp (R)	Undecided
Spry Strategies (R)	April 17–20, 2022	720 (LV)	± 3.7%	37%	38%	25%
Spry Strategies (R)	December 9–11, 2021	600 (LV)	± 4.0%	31%	38%	31%

==== Results ====
2022 Washington's 4th congressional district election
Party	Candidate	Votes	%
Republican	Dan Newhouse (incumbent)	150,619	66.5
Democratic	Doug White	70,710	31.2
Write-in		5,318	2.3
Total votes		226,647	100.0
Republican hold			

==== By county ====
County results
County	Dan Newhouse Republican		Doug White Democratic		Write-in Various		Margin		Total votes
County	#	%	#	%	#	%	#	%	Total votes
Adams (part)	1,435	72.95%	492	25.01%	40	2.03%	943	47.94%	1,967
Benton	50,939	68.22%	22,161	29.68%	1,572	2.11%	28,778	38.54%	74,672
Douglas (part)	10,734	69.10%	4,494	28.93%	306	1.97%	6,240	40.17%	15,534
Franklin (part)	13,034	68.13%	5,859	30.62%	239	1.25%	7,175	37.50%	19,132
Grant	19,210	73.58%	6,200	23.75%	696	2.67%	13,010	49.84%	26,106
Klickitat	6,597	58.25%	4,613	40.73%	115	1.02%	1,984	17.52%	11,325
Okanogan	9,669	59.40%	6,211	38.15%	399	2.45%	3,458	21.24%	16,279
Yakima	39,001	63.28%	20,680	33.55%	1,951	3.17%	18,321	29.73%	61,632
Totals	150,619	66.46%	70,710	31.20%	5,318	2.35%	79,909	35.26%	226,647

== District 5 ==
2022 Washington's 5th congressional district election
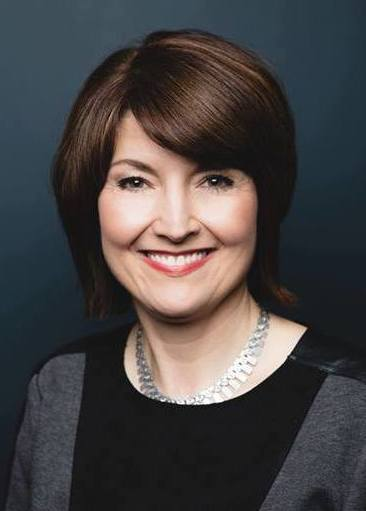

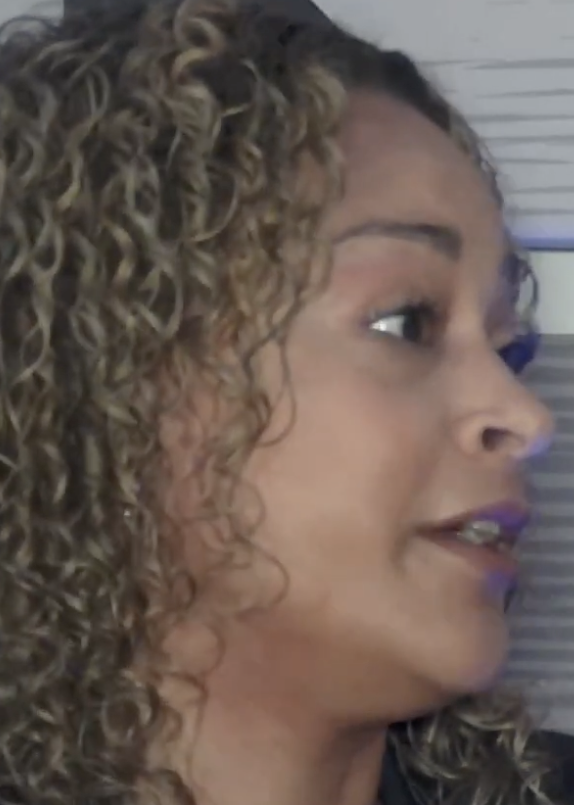
Candidate	Cathy McMorris Rodgers	Natasha Hill
Party	Republican	Democratic
Popular vote	188,648	127,585
Percentage	59.5%	40.2%
- McMorris Rodgers: 40–50% 50–60% 60–70% 70–80% 80–90% >90% Hill: 40–50% 50–60% 60–70% 70–80% 80–90% >90% Tie: 40–50% 50% No data
U.S. Representative before election
Cathy McMorris Rodgers
Republican
Elected U.S. Representative
Cathy McMorris Rodgers
Republican

Before redistricting, the 5th district encompassed eastern Washington, and included the city of Spokane. The incumbent was Republican Cathy McMorris Rodgers, who had represented the 5th district since 2005. McMorris Rodgers was most recently re-elected in 2022, garnering 59.7% of the vote.

=== Primary election ===
==== Candidates ====
===== Advanced to general =====
- Natasha Hill (Democratic), attorney
- Cathy McMorris Rodgers (Republican), incumbent U.S. Representative

===== Eliminated in primary =====
- Sean Clynch (Republican)
- Ann Marie Danimus (Democratic), business owner

==== Endorsements ====
Cathy McMorris Rodgers (R)

Organizations

- Citizens for Responsible Energy Solutions
- Maggie's List
- Pro-Israel America
Natasha Hill (D)

Organizations

- National Women's Political Caucus of Washington

Labor unions

- Washington State Labor Council

==== Results ====
Results by county McMorris Rodgers: 40–50% 50–60% 60–70% 70–80%

Blanket primary results
Party	Candidate	Votes	%
Republican	Cathy McMorris Rodgers (incumbent)	106,072	51.5
Democratic	Natasha Hill	61,851	30.0
Democratic	Ann Marie Danimus	21,123	10.3
Republican	Sean Clynch	16,831	8.2
Total votes		205,877	100.0

=== General election ===
==== Debate ====
2022 Washington's 5th congressional district debate
No.	Date	Host	Moderator	Link	Republican	Democratic
Key: P Participant A Absent N Not invited I Invited W Withdrawn						
Key: P Participant A Absent N Not invited I Invited W Withdrawn					Cathy McMorris Rodgers	Natasha Hill
1	Oct. 20, 2022	KSPS-TV	Kristi Gorenson		P	P

==== Predictions ====
Source	Ranking	As of
The Cook Political Report	Solid R	February 10, 2022
Inside Elections	Solid R	March 31, 2022
Sabato's Crystal Ball	Safe R	February 16, 2022
Politico	Likely R	April 5, 2022
RCP	Safe R	June 9, 2022
Fox News	Solid R	July 11, 2022
DDHQ	Solid R	July 20, 2022
538	Solid R	June 30, 2022
The Economist	Safe R	September 28, 2022

==== Results ====
2022 Washington's 5th congressional district election
Party	Candidate	Votes	%
Republican	Cathy McMorris Rodgers (incumbent)	188,648	59.5
Democratic	Natasha Hill	127,585	40.2
Write-in		773	0.2
Total votes		317,006	100.0
Republican hold			

==== By county ====
County results
County	Cathy McMorris Rodgers Republican		Natasha Hill Democratic		Write-in Various		Margin		Total votes
County	#	%	#	%	#	%	#	%	Total votes
Adams (part)	1,752	83.07%	345	16.36%	12	0.57%	1,407	66.71%	2,109
Asotin	6,041	67.11%	2,939	32.65%	22	0.24%	3,102	34.46%	9,002
Columbia	1,649	76.24%	512	23.67%	2	0.09%	1,137	52.57%	2,163
Ferry	2,440	71.87%	944	27.81%	11	0.32%	1,496	44.06%	3,395
Franklin (part)	2,308	87.09%	342	12.91%	0	0.00%	1,966	74.19%	2,650
Garfield	1,031	80.67%	242	18.94%	5	0.39%	789	61.74%	1,278
Lincoln	4,864	78.97%	1,283	20.83%	12	0.19%	3,581	58.14%	6,159
Pend Oreille	4,799	71.01%	1,942	28.74%	17	0.25%	2,857	42.28%	6,758
Spokane	124,123	56.17%	96,337	43.59%	522	0.24%	27,786	12.57%	220,982
Stevens	16,956	74.50%	5,724	25.15%	79	0.35%	11,232	49.35%	22,759
Walla Walla	14,458	60.01%	9,581	39.77%	55	0.23%	4,877	20.24%	24,094
Whitman	8,227	52.55%	7,394	47.22%	36	0.23%	833	5.32%	15,657
Totals	188,648	59.51%	127,585	40.25%	773	0.24%	61,063	19.26%	317,006

== District 6 ==
2022 Washington's 6th congressional district election
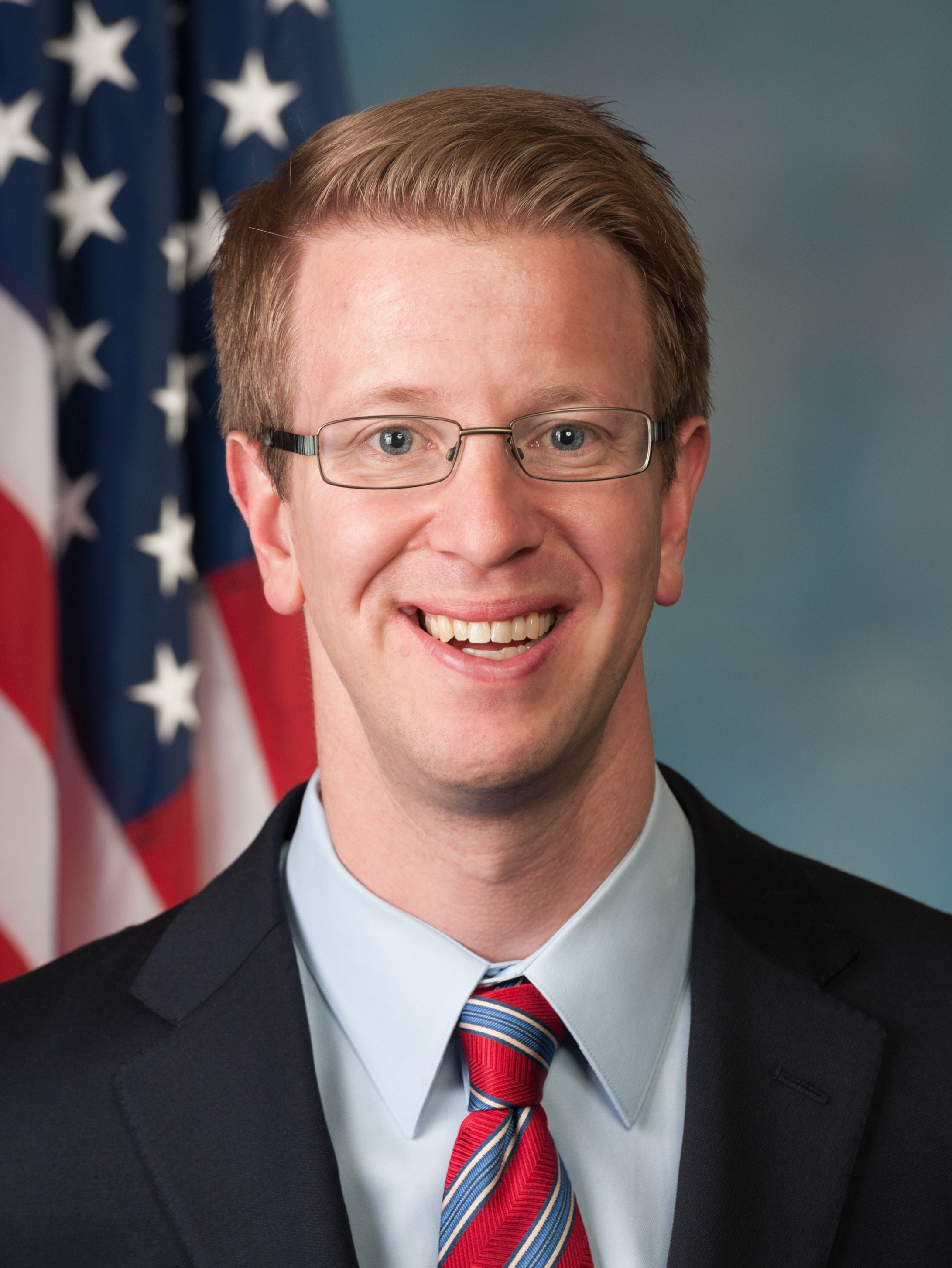

Candidate	Derek Kilmer	Elizabeth Kreiselmaier
Party	Democratic	Republican
Popular vote	208,710	138,754
Percentage	60.0%	39.9%
- Kilmer: 50–60% 60–70% 70–80% 80–90% >90% Kreiselmaier: 50–60% 60–70% 70–80% 80–90% >90% Tie: 40–50% 50% No data
U.S. Representative before election
Derek Kilmer
Democratic
Elected U.S. Representative
Derek Kilmer
Democratic

Before redistricting, the 6th district was based on the Olympic Peninsula, and included western Tacoma. The incumbent was Democrat Derek Kilmer, who had represented the 6th district since 2013. Kilmer was most recently re-elected in 2022, garnering 60.1% of the vote in the general election.

=== Primary election ===
==== Candidates ====
===== Advanced to general =====
- Derek Kilmer (Democratic), incumbent U.S. Representative
- Elizabeth Kreiselmaier (Republican), Special Education Research and Program Evaluator and runner-up for this district in 2020

===== Eliminated in primary =====
- Chris Binns (Republican)
- Todd Bloom (Republican)
- Rebecca Parson (Democratic), copywriter and candidate for this district in 2020
- Tom Triggs (independent)

===== Withdrew/disqualified =====
- Aaron Hansen (Republican), automobile assembler

==== Endorsements ====
Derek Kilmer (D)

Organizations

- League of Conservation Voters
- Planned Parenthood Action Fund
- Sierra Club

Labor unions

- National Education Association
- Service Employees International Union Local 775

Newspapers

- The News Tribune (post primary)
- The Seattle Times (primary only)
Rebecca Parson (D)

Organizations

- Brand New Congress
- National Women's Political Caucus of Washington

==== Results ====
Results by county Kilmer: 30–40% 40–50% 50–60% 60–70%

Blanket primary results
Party	Candidate	Votes	%
Democratic	Derek Kilmer (incumbent)	115,725	50.4
Republican	Elizabeth Kreiselmaier	54,621	23.8
Republican	Todd Bloom	24,036	10.5
Democratic	Rebecca Parson	21,523	9.4
Republican	Chris Binns	11,074	4.8
Independent	Tom Triggs	2,674	1.2
Total votes		229,653	100.0

=== General election ===
==== Predictions ====
Source	Ranking	As of
The Cook Political Report	Solid D	February 10, 2022
Inside Elections	Solid D	March 31, 2022
Sabato's Crystal Ball	Safe D	February 16, 2022
Politico	Likely D	April 5, 2022
RCP	Likely D	June 9, 2022
Fox News	Solid D	July 11, 2022
DDHQ	Solid D	November 3, 2022
538	Solid D	July 28, 2022
The Economist	Safe D	September 28, 2022

==== Results ====
2022 Washington's 6th congressional district election
Party	Candidate	Votes	%
Democratic	Derek Kilmer (incumbent)	208,710	60.0
Republican	Elizabeth Kreiselmaier	138,754	39.9
Write-in		409	0.1
Total votes		347,873	100.0
Democratic hold			

==== By county ====
County results
County	Derek Kilmer Democratic		Elizabeth Kreiselmaier Republican		Write-in Various		Margin		Total votes
County	#	%	#	%	#	%	#	%	Total votes
Clallam	22,146	54.69%	18,315	45.23%	30	0.07%	3,831	9.46%	40,491
Grays Harbor	14,735	49.84%	14,788	50.02%	44	0.15%	-53	-0.18%	29,567
Jefferson	15,312	72.47%	5,791	27.41%	27	0.13%	9,521	45.06%	21,130
Kitsap	74,910	60.86%	48,069	39.05%	116	0.09%	26,841	21.81%	123,095
Mason	14,601	49.71%	14,725	50.13%	45	0.15%	-124	-0.42%	29,371
Pierce (part)	67,006	64.29%	37,066	35.57%	147	0.14%	29,940	28.73%	104,219
Totals	208,710	60.00%	138,754	39.89%	409	0.12%	69,956	20.11%	347,873

== District 7 ==
2022 Washington's 7th congressional district election
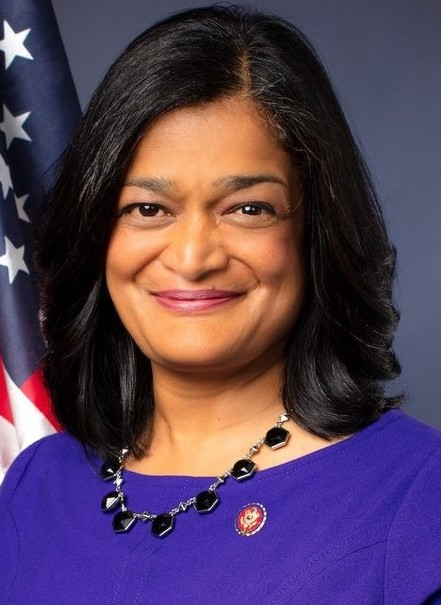

Candidate	Pramila Jayapal	Cliff Moon
Party	Democratic	Republican
Popular vote	295,998	49,207
Percentage	85.4%	14.2%
- Jayapal: 50–60% 60–70% 70–80% 80–90% >90%
U.S. Representative before election
Pramila Jayapal
Democratic
Elected U.S. Representative
Pramila Jayapal
Democratic

Before redistricting, the 7th congressional district encompassed most of Seattle, as well as Edmonds, Shoreline, Lake Forest Park, Vashon Island, and Burien. The incumbent was Democrat Pramila Jayapal, who had represented the 7th district since 2017. Jayapal was most recently re-elected in 2022, garnering 85.7% of the vote.

=== Primary election ===
==== Candidates ====
===== Advanced to general =====
- Pramila Jayapal (Democratic), incumbent U.S. Representative and Chair of the Congressional Progressive Caucus
- Cliff Moon (Republican)

===== Eliminated in primary =====
- Paul Glumaz (Republican), LaRouche activist
- Jesse James (independent)

===== Withdrawn =====
- Earnest Thompson (independent)

==== Endorsements ====
Pramila Jayapal (D)

Organizations

- Feminist Majority PAC
- Indivisible
- Justice Democrats
- King County Democratic Party
- League of Conservation Voters
- NARAL Pro-Choice America
- National Women's Political Caucus
- Planned Parenthood Action Fund
- Progressive Democrats of America
- Sierra Club

Labor unions

- National Education Association
- Service Employees International Union Local 775

Newspapers

- The Seattle Times (primary only)
- The Stranger
Cliff Moon (R)

Organizations

- King County Republican Party

==== Results ====
Results by county Jayapal: 80–90%

Blanket primary results
Party	Candidate	Votes	%
Democratic	Pramila Jayapal (incumbent)	177,665	84.9
Republican	Cliff Moon	15,834	7.6
Republican	Paul Glumaz	10,982	5.2
Independent	Jesse James	4,859	2.3
Total votes		209,340	100.0

=== General election ===
==== Predictions ====
Source	Ranking	As of
The Cook Political Report	Solid D	February 10, 2022
Inside Elections	Solid D	March 31, 2022
Sabato's Crystal Ball	Safe D	February 16, 2022
Politico	Solid D	April 5, 2022
RCP	Safe D	June 9, 2022
Fox News	Solid D	July 11, 2022
DDHQ	Solid D	July 20, 2022
538	Solid D	June 30, 2022
The Economist	Safe D	September 28, 2022

==== Results ====
2022 Washington's 7th congressional district election
Party	Candidate	Votes	%
Democratic	Pramila Jayapal (incumbent)	295,998	85.4
Republican	Cliff Moon	49,207	14.2
Write-in		1,442	0.4
Total votes		346,647	100.0
Democratic hold			

==== By county ====
County results
County	Pramila Jayapal Democratic		Cliff Moon Republican		Write-in Various		Margin		Total votes
County	#	%	#	%	#	%	#	%	Total votes
King (part)	295,998	85.39%	49,207	14.20%	1,442	0.42%	246,791	71.19%	346,647
Totals	295,998	85.39%	49,207	14.20%	1,442	0.42%	246,791	71.19%	346,647

== District 8 ==
2022 Washington's 8th congressional district election
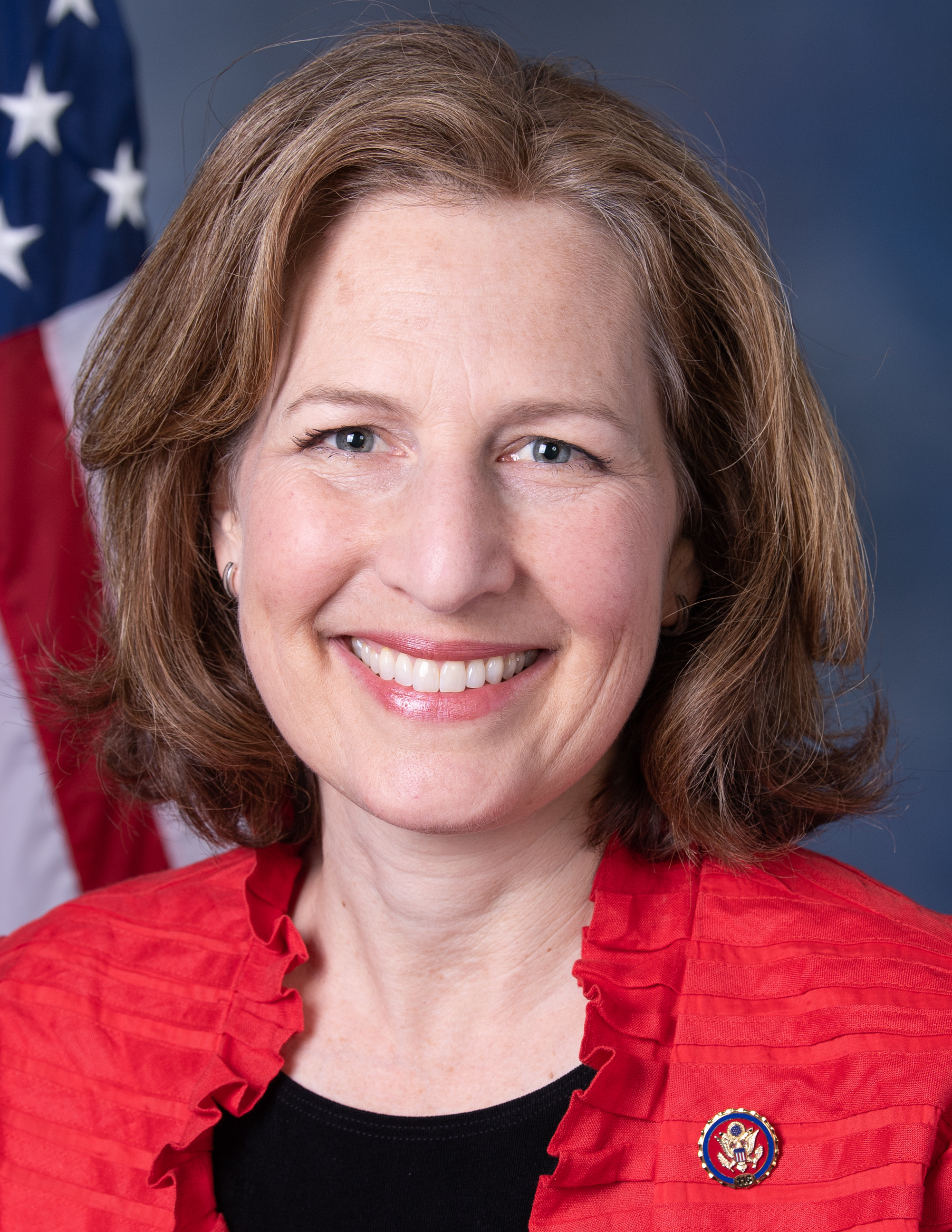

Candidate	Kim Schrier	Matt Larkin
Party	Democratic	Republican
Popular vote	179,003	155,976
Percentage	53.3%	46.4%
- Schrier: 40–50% 50–60% 60–70% 70–80% 80–90% >90% Larkin: 40–50% 50–60% 60–70% 70–80% 80–90% >90% Tie: 40–50% 50% No data
U.S. Representative before election
Kim Schrier
Democratic
Elected U.S. Representative
Kim Schrier
Democratic

Before redistricting, the 8th district encompassed the eastern suburbs of Seattle including Sammamish, Maple Valley, Covington, Hobart, Issaquah, and Auburn and stretched into rural central Washington, including Chelan County and Kittitas County, as well as taking in eastern Pierce County. The incumbent was Democrat Kim Schrier, who had represented the 8th district since 2019. Schrier was re-elected, garnering 53.4% of the vote in the general election.

=== Primary election ===
==== Candidates ====
===== Advanced to general =====
- Matt Larkin (Republican), manufacturing executive and runner-up for Washington Attorney General in 2020
- Kim Schrier (Democratic), incumbent U.S. Representative

===== Eliminated in primary =====
- Keith Arnold (Democratic), perennial candidate
- Ryan Burkett (independent), perennial candidate
- Dave Chapman (Republican)
- Patrick Dillon (independent), candidate for this district in 2018
- Reagan Dunn (Republican), King County Councilor and son of former U.S. Representative Jennifer Dunn
- Justin Greywolf (Libertarian), software engineer
- Jesse Jensen (Republican), U.S. Army veteran, Amazon senior project manager, and runner-up for this district in 2020
- Scott Stephenson (Republican), program manager
- Emet Ward (Democratic)

==== Endorsements ====
Reagan Dunn (R)

Newspapers

- The News Tribune (co-endorsed with Schrier)
Matt Larkin (R)

Sheriffs

- Brian Burnett, Chelan County sheriff (post primary)
- Adam Fortney, Snohomish County sheriff (post primary)
- Clayton Myers, Kittitas County sheriff (post primary)
- Ed Troyer, Pierce County sheriff (post primary)
Kim Schrier (D)

Local officials

- Frank Kuntz, Mayor of Wenatchee, Washington (Republican)
- Mary Lou Pauly, Mayor of Issaquah, Washington

Organizations

- 314 Action
- American Israel Public Affairs Committee
- Democratic Majority for Israel
- EMILY's List
- End Citizens United
- Feminist Majority PAC
- Giffords
- Jewish Democratic Council of America
- King County Democratic Party
- League of Conservation Voters
- NARAL Pro-Choice America
- National Women's Political Caucus
- Planned Parenthood Action Fund
- Sierra Club

Labor unions

- National Education Association
- Service Employees International Union Local 775

Newspapers

- The News Tribune (co-endorsed with Dunn)
- The Seattle Times (primary only)
- The Stranger

==== Polling ====
Poll source	Date(s) administered	Sample size	Margin of error	Kim Schrier (D)	Reagan Dunn (R)	Justin Greywolf (L)	Jesse Jensen (R)	Matt Larkin (R)	Matthew Overton (R)	Other/Undecided
Moore Information Group (R) (Note: Poll sponsored by Dunn's campaign)	November 18–21, 2021	400 (RV)	± 5.0%	30%	11%	7%	5%	5%	1%	41%

==== Results ====
Results by county Schrier: 30–40% 40–50% 50–60%

Blanket primary results
Party	Candidate	Votes	%
Democratic	Kim Schrier (incumbent)	97,700	47.9
Republican	Matt Larkin	34,684	17.0
Republican	Reagan Dunn	29,494	14.5
Republican	Jesse Jensen	26,350	12.9
Republican	Scott Stephenson	7,954	3.9
Democratic	Emet Ward	1,832	0.9
Republican	Dave Chapman	1,811	0.9
Democratic	Keith Arnold	1,669	0.8
Libertarian	Justin Greywolf	1,518	0.7
Independent	Ryan Burkett	701	0.3
Independent	Patrick Dillon	296	0.1
Total votes		204,009	100.0

=== General election ===
==== Predictions ====
Source	Ranking	As of
The Cook Political Report	Tossup	February 10, 2022
Inside Elections	Tossup	March 31, 2022
Sabato's Crystal Ball	Lean R (flip)	November 7, 2022
Politico	Tossup	April 5, 2022
RCP	Lean R (flip)	October 30, 2022
Fox News	Tossup	November 1, 2022
DDHQ	Lean D	October 29, 2022
538	Lean D	November 8, 2022
The Economist	Lean D	November 1, 2022

==== Polling ====
Poll source	Date(s) administered	Sample size	Margin of error	Kim Schrier (D)	Matt Larkin (R)	Other	Undecided
RMG Research	August 10–15, 2022	400 (LV)	± 4.9%	47%	43%	3%	8%

Hypothetical polling

Kim Schrier vs. Reagan Dunn

Poll source	Date(s) administered	Sample size	Margin of error	Kim Schrier (D)	Reagan Dunn (R)	Undecided
NMB Research (R) (Note: This poll was sponsored by Lead the Way PAC, which opposes Reagan Dunn in favor of Jesse Jensen)	May 2–5, 2022	400 (LV)	± 4.9%	48%	42%	10%
Moore Information Group (R)	November 18–21, 2021	400 (RV)	± 5.0%	36%	40%	25%

Kim Schrier vs. Jesse Jensen

Poll source	Date(s) administered	Sample size	Margin of error	Kim Schrier (D)	Jesse Jensen (R)	Undecided
NMB Research (R)	May 2–5, 2022	400 (LV)	± 4.9%	48%	42%	10%
Moore Information Group (R)	November 18–21, 2021	400 (RV)	± 5.0%	38%	37%	25%

=== Debate ===
2022 Washington's 8th congressional district debate
No.	Date	Host	Moderator	Link	Democratic	Republican
Key: P Participant A Absent N Not invited I Invited W Withdrawn						
Key: P Participant A Absent N Not invited I Invited W Withdrawn					Kim Schrier	Matt Larkin
1	Oct. 28, 2022	Washington State; Debate Coalition	Hana Kim		P	P

==== Results ====
2022 Washington's 8th congressional district election
Party	Candidate	Votes	%
Democratic	Kim Schrier (incumbent)	179,003	53.3
Republican	Matt Larkin	155,976	46.4
Write-in		1,059	0.3
Total votes		336,038	100.0
Democratic hold			

==== By county ====
County results
County	Kim Schrier Democratic		Matt Larkin Republican		Write-in Various		Margin		Total votes
County	#	%	#	%	#	%	#	%	Total votes
Chelan	15,855	46.50%	18,113	53.12%	131	0.38%	-2,258	-6.62%	34,099
Douglas (part)	123	42.41%	167	57.59%	0	0.00%	-44	-15.17%	290
King (part)	113,403	62.02%	69,034	37.75%	424	0.23%	44,369	24.26%	182,861
Kittitas	9,350	45.14%	11,291	54.51%	71	0.34%	-1,941	-9.37%	20,712
Pierce (part)	28,387	40.32%	41,687	59.22%	325	0.46%	-13,300	-18.89%	70,399
Snohomish (part)	11,885	42.94%	15,684	56.67%	108	0.39%	-3,799	-13.73%	27,677
Totals	179,003	53.27%	155,976	46.42%	1,059	0.32%	23,027	6.85%	336,038

== District 9 ==
2022 Washington's 9th congressional district election
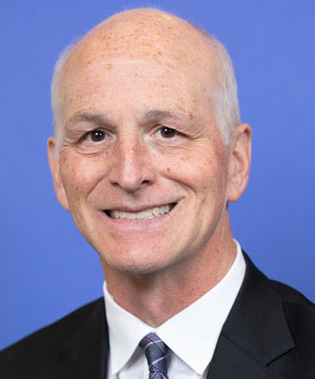

Candidate	Adam Smith	Doug Basler
Party	Democratic	Republican
Popular vote	171,746	67,631
Percentage	71.6%	28.2%
- Smith: 50–60% 60–70% 70–80% 80–90% >90% Basler 40–50% 50–60% Tie: 40–50% 50% No data
U.S. Representative before election
Adam Smith
Democratic
Elected U.S. Representative
Adam Smith
Democratic

Before redistricting, the 9th congressional district stretched from small parts of northeastern Tacoma up to southeastern Seattle, taking in the surrounding suburbs, including Federal Way, Des Moines, Kent, SeaTac, Renton, Mercer Island, and Bellevue. The incumbent was Democrat Adam Smith, who had represented the 9th district since 1997. Smith was most recently re-elected in 2022, garnering 71.7% of the vote in the general election.

=== Primary election ===
==== Candidates ====
===== Advanced to general =====
- Doug Basler (Republican), perennial candidate
- Adam Smith (Democratic), incumbent U.S. Representative

===== Eliminated in primary =====
- David Anderson (independent), candidate for Washington Secretary of State in 2012
- Sea Chan (Republican), maritime professional and environmental researcher
- Stephanie Gallardo (Democratic), teacher and WEA/NEA board director
- Seth Pedersen (Republican)

===== Withdrew =====
- Krystal Marx (Democratic), deputy mayor of Burien and executive director of Seattle Pride (running for re-election, endorsed Gallardo)

===== Declined =====
- Sarah Smith (Democratic), runner-up for this district in 2018 (endorsed Gallardo)

==== Endorsements ====
Doug Basler (R)

Organizations

- King County Republican Party
Stephanie Gallardo (D)

Local officials

- Krystal Marx, former Deputy Mayor of Burien and executive director of Seattle Pride

Organizations

- Brand New Congress
- Democratic Socialists of America
- National Women's Political Caucus of Washington
- Washington State Democratic Party Environment and Climate Caucus

Labor unions

- National Education Association
Adam Smith (D)

Organizations

- King County Democratic Party
- Planned Parenthood Action Fund
- Sierra Club

Labor unions

- National Education Association
- Service Employees International Union Local 775

Newspapers

- The Seattle Times (primary only)
- The Stranger

==== Results ====
Results by county Smith: 50–60%

Blanket primary results
Party	Candidate	Votes	%
Democratic	Adam Smith (incumbent)	78,272	55.3
Republican	Doug Basler	29,144	20.6
Democratic	Stephanie Gallardo	22,531	15.9
Republican	Sea Chan	5,338	3.8
Republican	Seth Pedersen	4,781	3.4
Independent	David Anderson	1,541	1.1
Total votes		141,607	100.0

=== General election ===
==== Predictions ====
Source	Ranking	As of
The Cook Political Report	Solid D	February 10, 2022
Inside Elections	Solid D	March 31, 2022
Sabato's Crystal Ball	Safe D	February 16, 2022
Politico	Solid D	April 5, 2022
RCP	Safe D	June 9, 2022
Fox News	Solid D	July 11, 2022
DDHQ	Solid D	July 20, 2022
538	Solid D	June 30, 2022
The Economist	Safe D	September 28, 2022

==== Debate ====
2022 Washington's 9th congressional district debate
No.	Date	Host	Moderator	Link	Democratic	Republican
Key: P Participant A Absent N Not invited I Invited W Withdrawn						
Key: P Participant A Absent N Not invited I Invited W Withdrawn					Adam Smith	Doug Basler
1	Oct. 25, 2022	KCTS9; TVW; Washington State; Debate Coalition	Mary Nam		P	P

==== Results ====
2022 Washington's 9th congressional district election
Party	Candidate	Votes	%
Democratic	Adam Smith (incumbent)	171,746	71.6
Republican	Doug Basler	67,631	28.2
Write-in		471	0.2
Total votes		239,848	100.0
Democratic hold			

==== By county ====
County results
County	Adam Smith Democratic		Doug Basler Republican		Write-in Various		Margin		Total votes
County	#	%	#	%	#	%	#	%	Total votes
King (part)	171,746	71.61%	67,631	28.20%	471	0.20%	104,115	43.41%	239,848
Totals	171,746	71.61%	67,631	28.20%	471	0.20%	104,115	43.41%	239,848

== District 10 ==
2022 Washington's 10th congressional district election
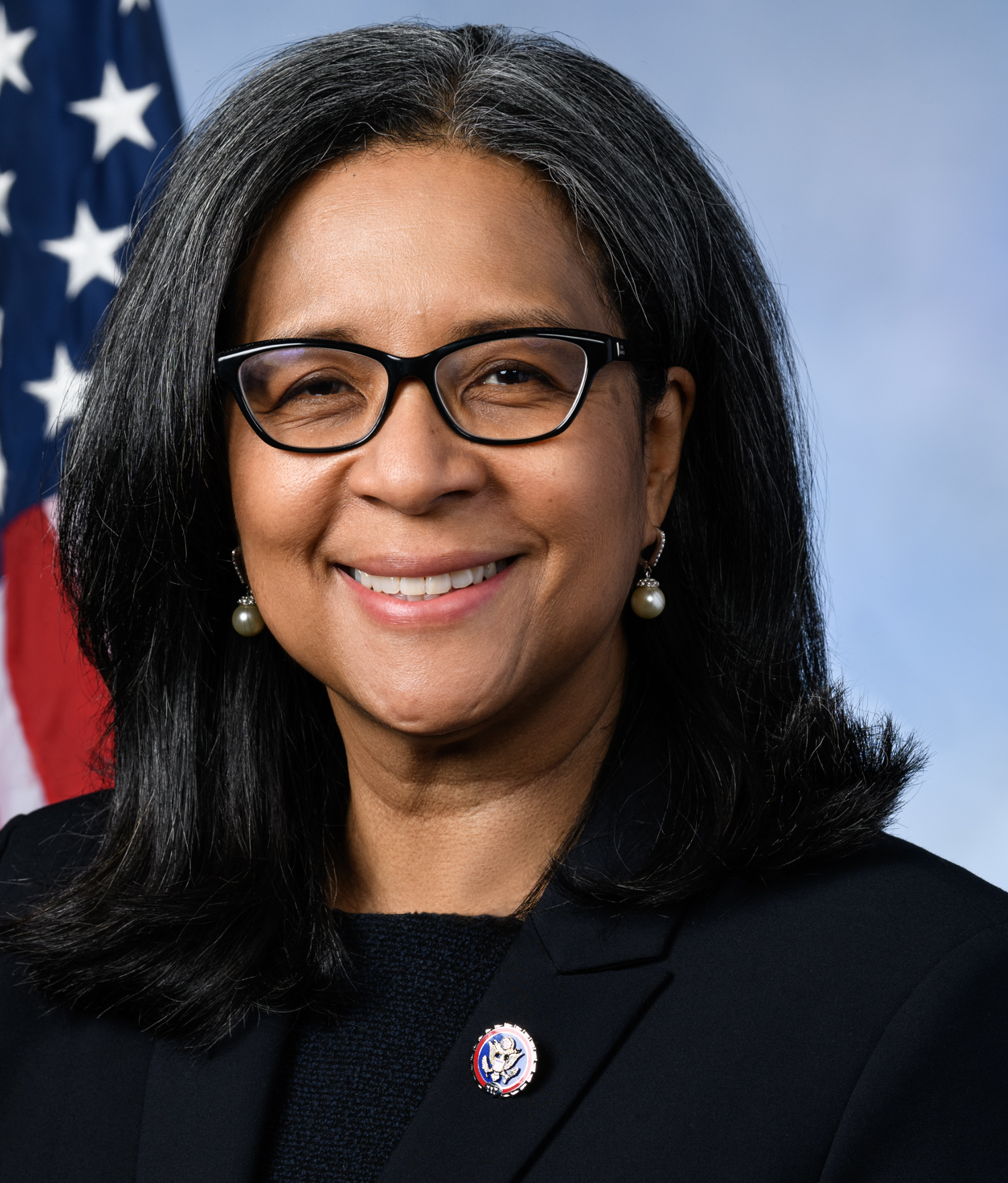

Candidate	Marilyn Strickland	Keith Swank
Party	Democratic	Republican
Popular vote	152,544	114,777
Percentage	57.0%	42.9%
- Strickland: 40–50% 50–60% 60–70% 70–80% 80–90% >90% Swank: 40–50% 50–60% 60–70% 70–80% 80–90% >90% Tie: 40–50% 50% No data
U.S. Representative before election
Marilyn Strickland
Democratic
Elected U.S. Representative
Marilyn Strickland
Democratic

Before redistricting, the 10th district included Olympia and the Tacoma suburbs, including Puyallup, Lakewood, and University Place. The incumbent was Democrat Marilyn Strickland, who had represented the 10th district since 2021. Strickland most recently ran for re-election in 2022, garnering 57.1% of the vote in the general election.

=== Primary election ===
==== Candidates ====
===== Advanced to general =====
- Marilyn Strickland (Democratic), incumbent U.S. Representative
- Keith Swank (Republican), former SPD officer, candidate for the 8th district in 2012 and 2020, and candidate for U.S. Senate in 2018

===== Eliminated in primary =====
- Richard Boyce (independent)
- Dan Gordon (Republican), candidate for this district in 2020
- Eric Mahaffy (Democratic)

===== Withdrew/disqualified =====
- Don Hewett (Republican), electrical engineer, U.S. Air Force veteran, and candidate for this district in 2020

==== Endorsements ====
Marilyn Strickland (D)

Organizations

- NARAL Pro-Choice America
- National Women's Political Caucus
- Planned Parenthood Action Fund
- Sierra Club

Labor unions

- National Education Association
- Service Employees International Union Local 775

Newspapers

- The News Tribune (post primary)
- The Seattle Times (primary only)
Keith Swank

Organizations

- Pierce County Republican Party
- Thurston County Republican Party

==== Forum ====
2022 Washington's 10th congressional district primary election candidate forum
No.	Date	Host	Moderator	Link	Independent	Republican	Democratic	Democratic	Republican
Key: P Participant A Absent N Not invited I Invited W Withdrawn									
Key: P Participant A Absent N Not invited I Invited W Withdrawn					Richard Boyce	Dan Gordon	Eric Mahaffy	Marilyn Strickland	Keith Swank
1	Jul. 12, 2022	League of Women Voters of Tacoma-Pierce County; League of Women Voters of Thurston County	Lydia Zepeda		P	A	P	P	P

==== Results ====
Results by county Strickland: 50–60% 60–70%

Blanket primary results
Party	Candidate	Votes	%
Democratic	Marilyn Strickland (incumbent)	90,093	55.4
Republican	Keith Swank	55,231	34.0
Republican	Dan Gordon	10,315	6.3
Democratic	Eric Mahaffy	3,710	2.3
Independent	Richard Boyce	3,250	2.0
Total votes		162,599	100.0

=== General election ===
==== Forum ====
2022 Washington's 10th congressional district candidate forum
No.	Date	Host	Moderator	Link	Democratic	Republican
Key: P Participant A Absent N Not invited I Invited W Withdrawn						
Key: P Participant A Absent N Not invited I Invited W Withdrawn					Marilyn Strickland	Keith Swank
1	Oct. 17, 2022	League of Women Voters of Tacoma-Pierce County; League of Women Voters of Thurston County	Lydia Zepeda		P	P

==== Predictions ====
Source	Ranking	As of
The Cook Political Report	Solid D	February 10, 2022
Inside Elections	Solid D	March 31, 2022
Sabato's Crystal Ball	Safe D	February 16, 2022
Politico	Solid D	April 5, 2022
RCP	Likely D	October 31, 2022
Fox News	Solid D	July 11, 2022
DDHQ	Solid D	July 20, 2022
538	Solid D	June 30, 2022
The Economist	Safe D	November 3, 2022

==== Results ====
2022 Washington's 10th congressional district election
Party	Candidate	Votes	%
Democratic	Marilyn Strickland (incumbent)	152,544	57.0
Republican	Keith Swank	114,777	42.9
Write-in		427	0.2
Total votes		267,748	100.0
Democratic hold			

==== By county ====
County results
County	Marilyn Strickland Democratic		Keith Swank Republican		Write-in Various		Margin		Total votes
County	#	%	#	%	#	%	#	%	Total votes
Pierce (part)	84,232	53.78%	72,123	46.05%	264	0.17%	12,109	7.73%	156,619
Thurston (part)	68,312	61.47%	42,654	38.38%	163	0.15%	25,658	23.09%	111,129
Totals	152,544	56.97%	114,777	42.87%	427	0.16%	37,767	14.11%	267,748

== Notes ==
Partisan clients
