= 2019 Manbij bombing =

Suicide bombing attack in Syria

Coordinates: 36°31′17″N 37°57′9″E

Manbij bombing
- Part of the Eastern Syrian insurgency and the American-led intervention in the Syrian Civil War
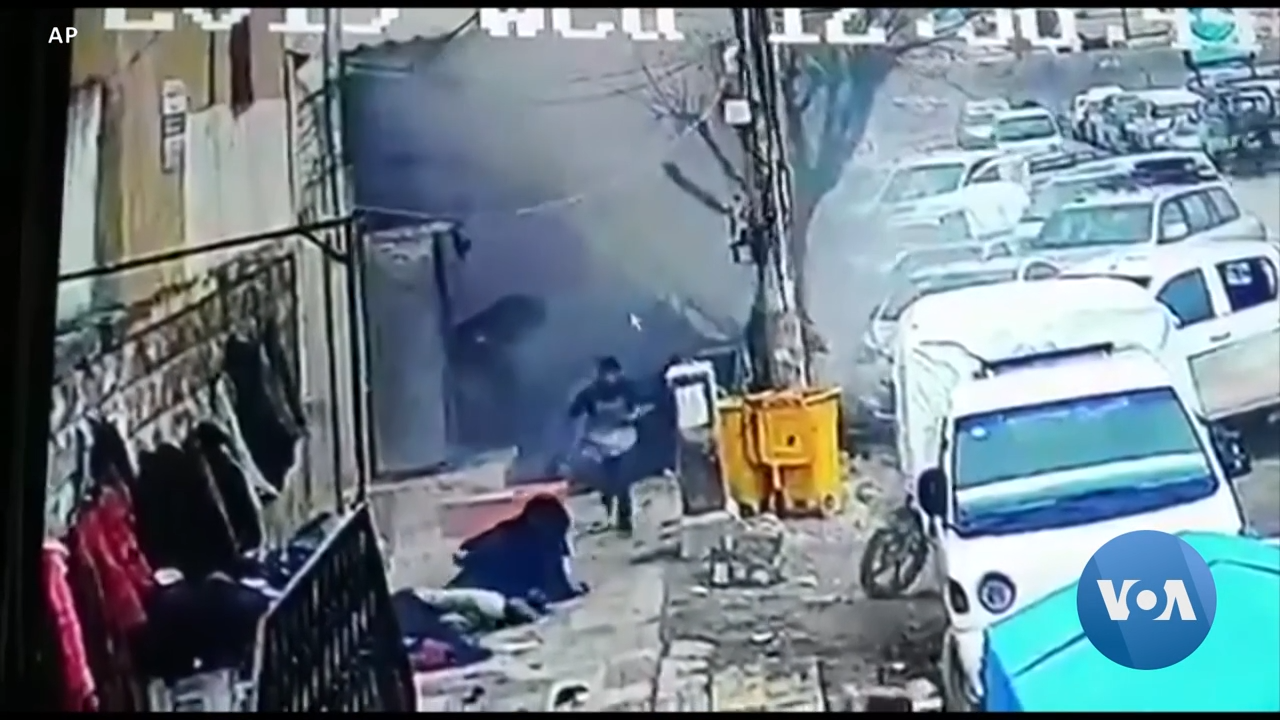
- Immediate aftermath of the bombing
- Location: Manbij, Aleppo Governorate, Syria
- Date: 16 January 2019; 12:38 (UTC+3)
- Target: American military personnel
- Attack type: Suicide bombing
- Weapon: Bomb
- Deaths: 19: 10 civilians; 1 US soldier; 1 US sailor; 1 American contractor; 1 DOD civilian employee; 5 local escorts
- Injuries: 3 US servicemen
- Perpetrator: Islamic State

The Manbij bombing occurred on 16 January 2019 when a suicide bomber targeted a busy market street in Manbij, Syria, known to be frequented by American soldiers during the Syrian civil war.

The action has been ascribed to ISIS.

== Background ==
In the Syrian civil war, the city of Manbij was taken by the Free Syrian Army in 2012, and then by ISIS in 2014. In 2016, the city was taken by the American-backed Syrian Democratic Forces (SDF) in the Manbij offensive.

The Palace of the Princes restaurant was popular with Americans, located on a crowded downtown street in Manbij. U.S. senators Lindsey Graham and Jeanne Shaheen ate there when they visited Syria in July 2018.

== The attack ==
Several American military personnel were inside the Palace of Princes restaurant when a suicide bomber triggered an explosion outside the restaurant around midday on Wednesday, 16 January 2019. The bomber mixed into a crowd of people visiting a nearby vegetable market and detonated his explosive vest near the restaurant entrance, igniting a fireball that left the dead and wounded scattered in the street. Rescue workers rushed the wounded to the hospital, and military helicopters landed on a nearby soccer field to take the dead and wounded Americans and civilians to medical facilities.

== Casualties ==
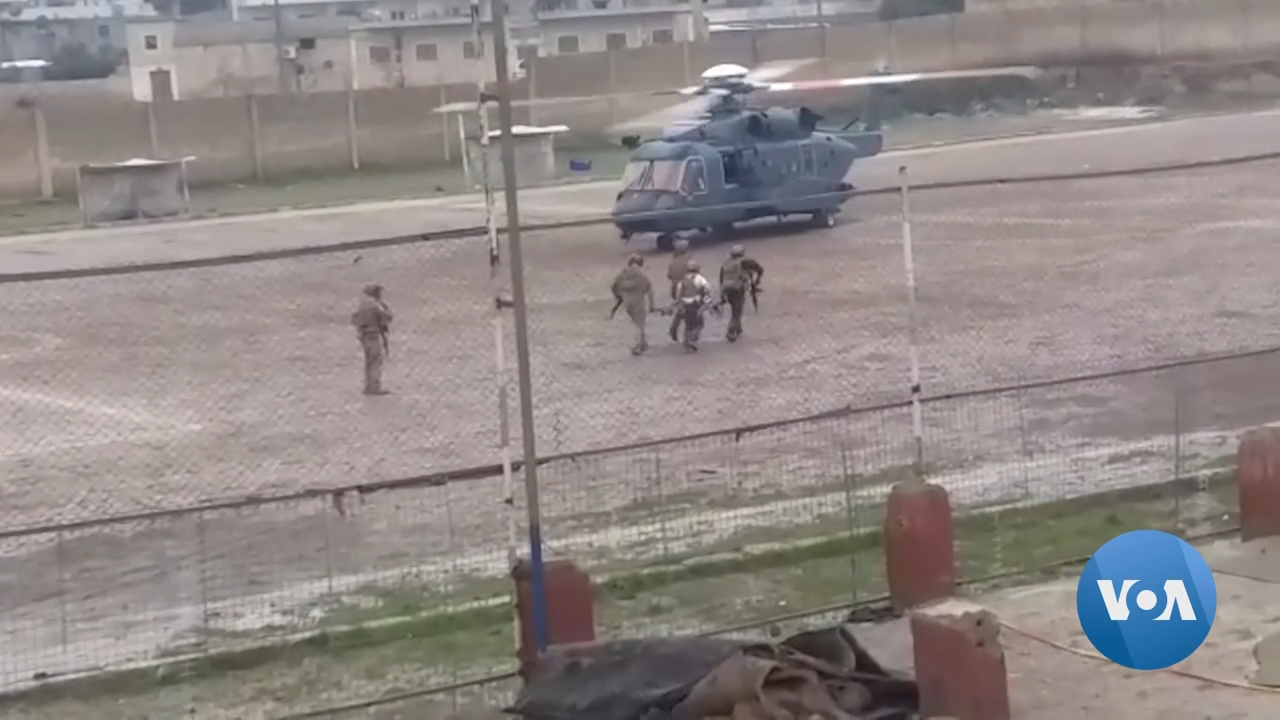
US soldiers transporting an American wounded in the bombing to a helicopter

The U.S. Department of Defense released a statement on 18 January 2019, identifying their three employees: a soldier, a sailor, and an intelligence expert. Defense contractor Valiant Integrated Services identified one of their employees as the fourth American killed. The four deceased Americans were:

- Army Chief Warrant Officer 2 Jonathan R. Farmer, 37, of Boynton Beach, Florida. Farmer was assigned to 3rd Battalion, 5th Special Forces Group (Airborne), Fort Campbell, Kentucky.
- Navy Chief Cryptologic Technician (Interpretive) Shannon M. Kent, 35, of upstate New York. Kent was assigned to Cryptologic Warfare Activity 66, based at Fort George G. Meade, Maryland.
- DOD civilian intelligence officer Scott A. Wirtz of St. Louis, Missouri. Wirtz was assigned to the Defense Intelligence Agency as an operations support specialist.
- Civilian contractor Ghadir (Jasmine) Taher of East Point, Georgia. Taher worked for Valiant Integrated Services as an interpreter for U.S. troops in Syria.

The total death toll is believed to be 19, including 15 local SDF fighters. Three other American servicemen were also injured. The Islamic State claimed responsibility for the bombing.

== Aftermath ==
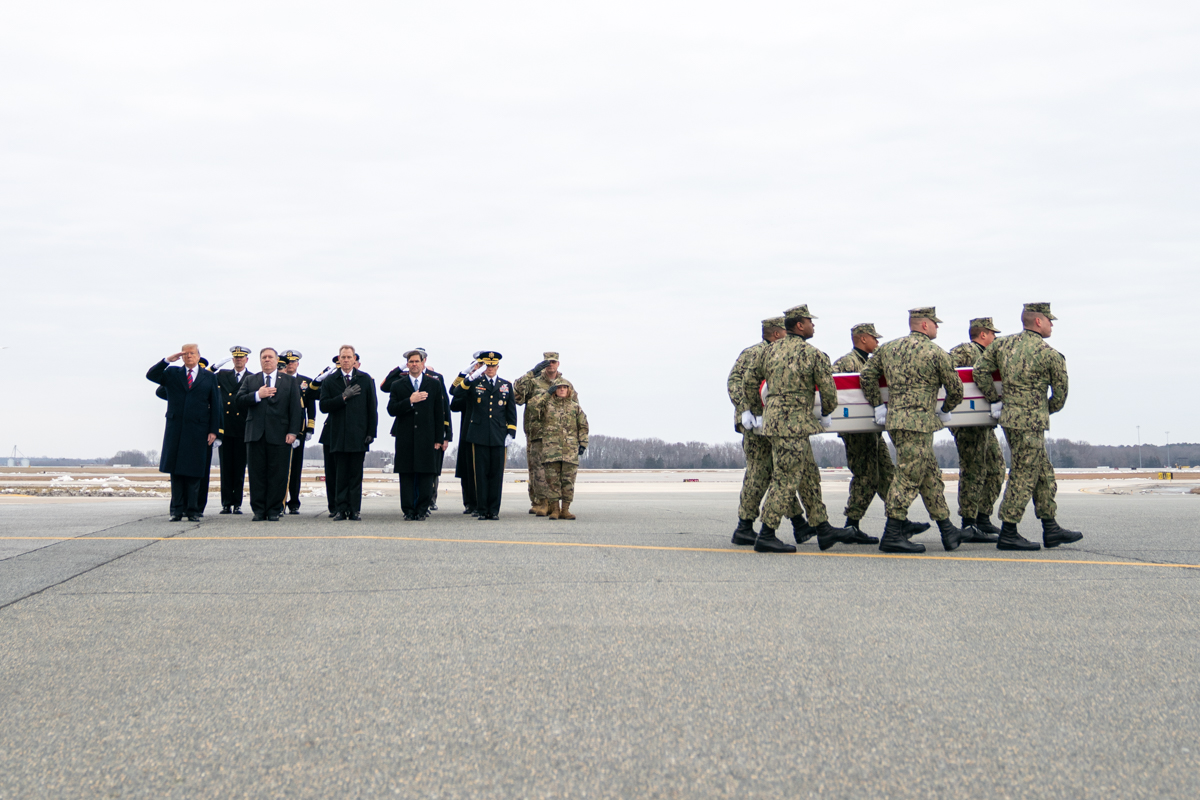
U.S. President Donald Trump, Defense Secretary Patrick Shanahan, and Secretary of State Mike Pompeo attend the Dignified Transfer of Remains Ceremony, 19 January 2019

U.S. President Donald Trump paid tribute to the fallen Americans during a trip to Dover Air Force Base in the US state of Delaware on 19 January, where their remains were received.

A second joint convoy of U.S. and allied Kurdish forces in northeastern Syria was hit in al-Hasakah 5 days later. There were no serious casualties; two Kurdish fighters were lightly wounded in the blast.
