= Shannon M. Kent =

United States Navy sailor (1983–2019)

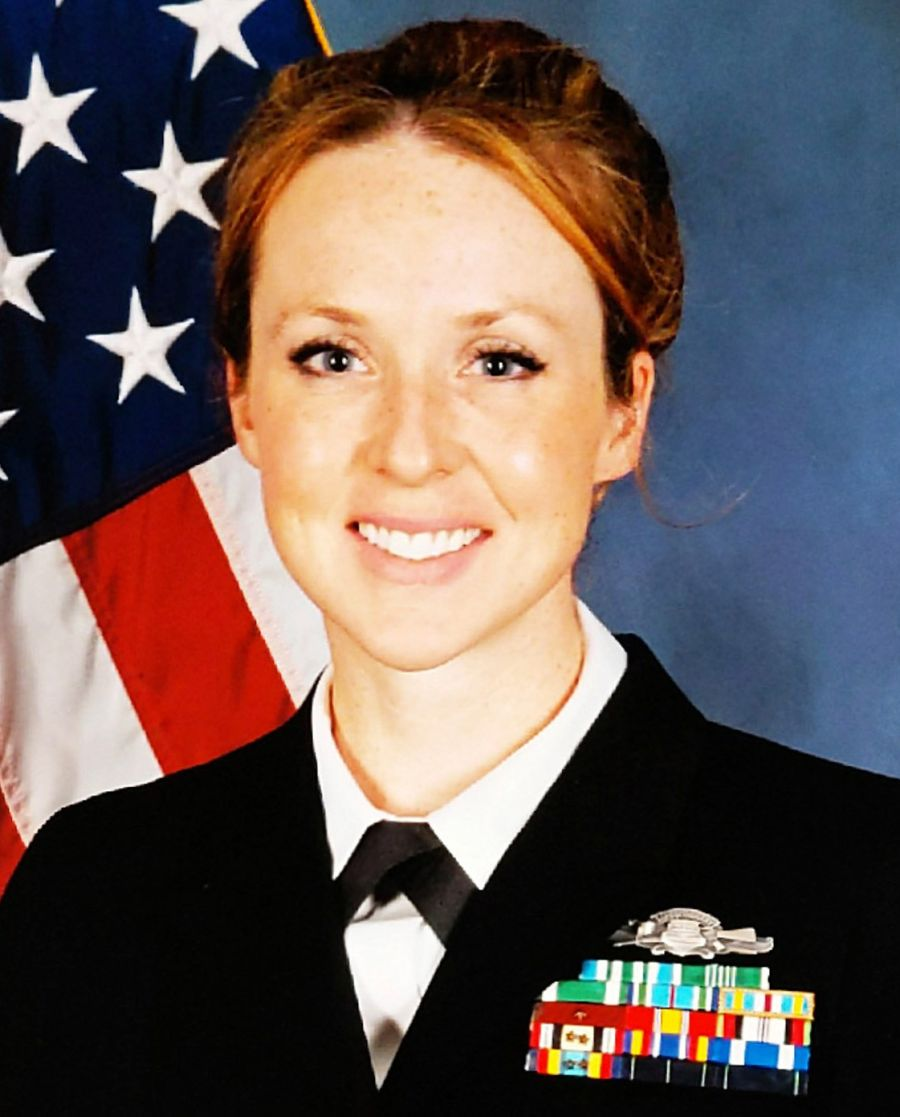
- Born: May 11, 1983; Oswego, New York, U.S.
- Died: January 16, 2019 (aged 35); Manbij, North and East Syria, Syria
- Burial place: Arlington National Cemetery
- Spouse: Joe Kent (m. 2014)
- Children: 2
- Military career
- Allegiance: United States
- Branch: United States Navy
- Service years: 2003–2019
- Rank: Senior chief petty officer
- Unit: Intelligence Support Activity
- Conflict: War on terror: War in Afghanistan; Iraq War; US intervention in the Syrian civil war †
- Awards: Bronze Star; Purple Heart; Defense Meritorious Service Medal; Meritorious Service Medal

Shannon Mary Kent (née Smith; May 11, 1983 – January 16, 2019) was a United States Navy cryptologic technician and member of JSOC's Intelligence Support Activity who was killed in the 2019 Manbij bombing. She was the wife of Joe Kent, who entered politics in response to her death.

== Early life and education ==
Kent was born Shannon Mary Smith on May 11, 1983, in Oswego, New York. Her father, Col. Stephen Smith, was the third-ranked police officer in the New York State Police. Her mother was an elementary school teacher. She grew up in Pine Plains, New York, attending Stissing Mountain J/S High School, where she was an honors student and an athlete, graduating in 2001.

== Career ==
Kent enlisted in the Navy on December 11, 2003, and graduated from boot camp at Recruit Training Command, Great Lakes, Illinois, in February 2004. She was assigned to Navy Information Operations Command, Fort Gordon, Georgia; Navy Special Warfare Support Activity 2, NAVSPECWAR, Norfolk, Virginia; Personnel Resource Development Office, Washington, D.C.; Navy Information Operations Command Maryland, Fort Meade; and Cryptologic Warfare Group 6, Fort Meade. She was the noncommissioned officer in charge at the National Security Agency’s operations directorate for four years. Kent reported to Cryptologic Warfare Activity 66 (CWA-66) at Fort Meade after the command was established on August 10, 2008. Kent was considered a 'rock star' among the linguists. She was fluent in Spanish, French, Portuguese, and Arabic, and rose quickly through the ranks as a cryptologist at Fort Meade.

In 2007, Kent volunteered for an Individual Augmentee assignment and was deployed to Iraq on an intelligence team supporting Navy SEALs. In 2008, she underwent training for a permanent position on a SEAL support team, and she was deployed to Afghanistan to support a SEAL team in 2012.

In February 2018, Kent received clearance to attend the Navy's doctorate psychology program at the Uniformed Services University of the Health Sciences, but the Navy reversed the move because her previous cancer diagnosis made her medically unfit to be commissioned as an officer. She applied for a waiver and sought congressional help, but the Navy maintained its decision. Kent was deployed to Syria in November 2018.

On January 16, 2019, Kent was part of a group conducting an intelligence-gathering mission, which involved meeting with local military officials at a location near a well-protected area of Manbij, Syria, consisting of the Civil Administration of Manbij Building, a local school, a bazaar, and a local restaurant frequented by U.S. personnel, the Palace of the Princes. During the mission, the convoy—consisting of U.S. forces and Syrian Democratic Forces (SDF)—established parking and security at the Palace of the Princes restaurant as opposed to their original plan at the local school due to the situation on the ground. After a portion of the element established a security patrol, Kent and Scott "Scotty" Wirz completed their mission objective and returned with the remainder of the element that was out on a foot patrol, ultimately regrouping in front of the restaurant in preparation to return to a base on the outskirts of the city. It was then that a man wearing a suicide vest walked by outside from the south of the market toward the restaurant entrance and detonated his device. Kent and Wirz were killed in the blast along with two other Americans who were in Syria as part of – Combined Joint Task Force – Operation Inherent Resolve. Eleven Syrian nationals also died in the attack. The area was in a northern Syria buffer zone between Kurdish fighters and Turkish forces that had been regarded as a stable area.

Kent was the first female combat death in Syria since combat operations began against ISIS in Syria, and the first female U.S. service member killed by enemy fire in more than three years. The 2019 Manbij bombing killed a total of 19 people, including Kent, a Special Forces soldier, two U.S. civilian contractors, allied coalition fighters of the Syrian Democratic Forces, and a number of civilians. The three other Americans casualties were: Scott A. Wirtz, a former SEAL; Army Special Forces Chief Warrant Officer Jonathan R. Farmer; and Ghadir Taher, a translator with Valiant Integrated Service, a U.S. Department of Defense contractor. Three other Americans were also wounded in the attack. The Islamic State of Iraq and the Levant claimed responsibility.

== Personal life ==
Kent was diagnosed with thyroid cancer in 2006 and was successfully treated surgically.

She married Joe Kent, a former special operations soldier who later served as Director of the National Counterterrorism Center (2025–2026). The couple met at the selection course for the Intelligence Support Activity. They lived in Crownsville, Maryland, with their two young sons, who were aged 3 years and 18 months at the time of her death.

== Awards and decorations ==
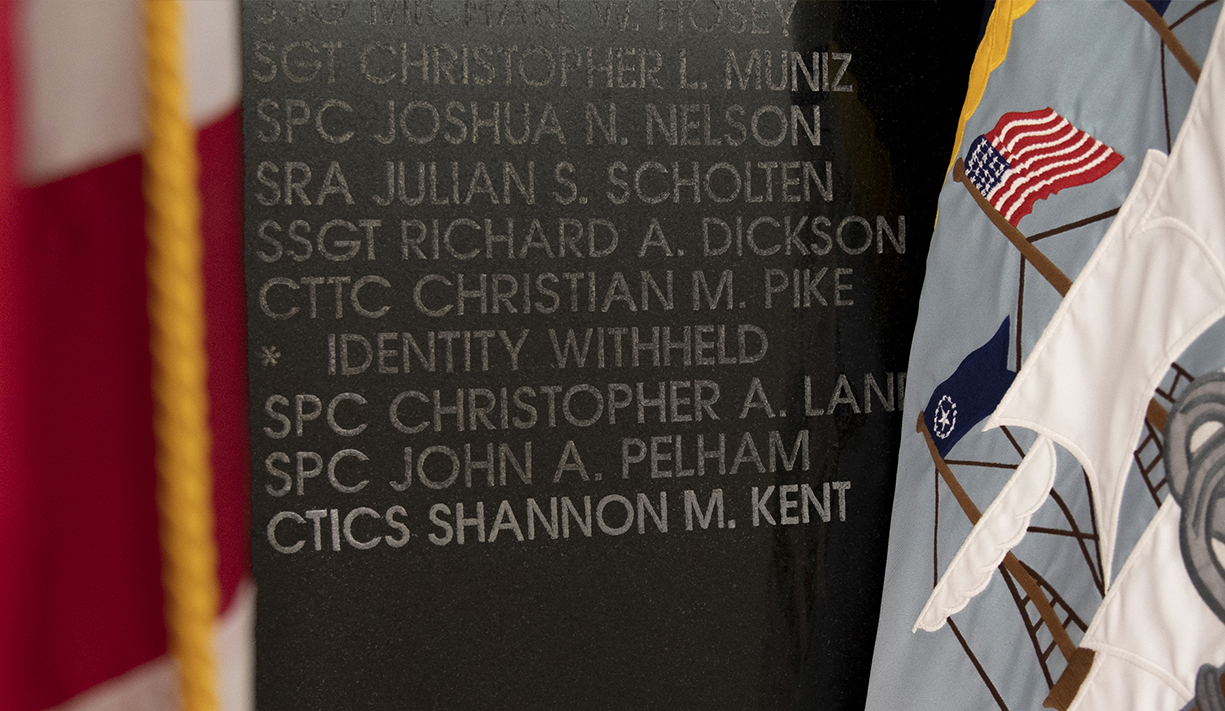
Kent's name on the NSA National Cryptologic Memorial Wall

Kent received the Joint Service Commendation Medal twice, the Navy and Marine Corps Commendation Medal, the Army Commendation Medal, the Joint Service Achievement Medal, the Joint Meritorious Unit Award, a Good Conduct Medal, the National Defense Service Medal, the Iraq Campaign Medal, the Sea Deployment Ribbon, the Rifle Marksmanship Ribbon, and the Pistol Marksmanship Ribbon.

U.S. President Donald Trump paid tribute to her and the three other fallen Americans during a trip to Dover Air Force Base on 19 January 2019, where their remains were received. She was buried in Arlington National Cemetery in Arlington, Virginia.

Kent was posthumously promoted to senior chief petty officer and awarded the Bronze Star, Purple Heart, Defense Meritorious Service Medal, Meritorious Service Medal, and a Combat Action Ribbon. The Navy also credited her for work done for the NSA's Operations Directorate in Special Operations. Her work was used at the highest levels of SIGINT in deciphering the intelligence gleaned through message intercepts and foreign communications. After Kent's death, New York Governor Andrew M. Cuomo ordered state flags flown at half-staff and Dutchess County state legislature Chair Gregg Pulver issued a statement praising her as a "Brilliant mind and a small-town hero." On February 14, 2019, Congressman Antonio Delgado introduced a resolution in the United States House of Representatives honoring the life of Senior Chief Petty Officer Shannon M. Kent.

Her name was added to the Cryptologic Memorial Wall at the NSA's headquarters in Fort Meade, Maryland. In August 2019, the Defense Language Institute in Presidio of Monterey, California dedicated the Kent Navy Yard in her honor.
