= Gavin Wax =

American political operative (born 1993)

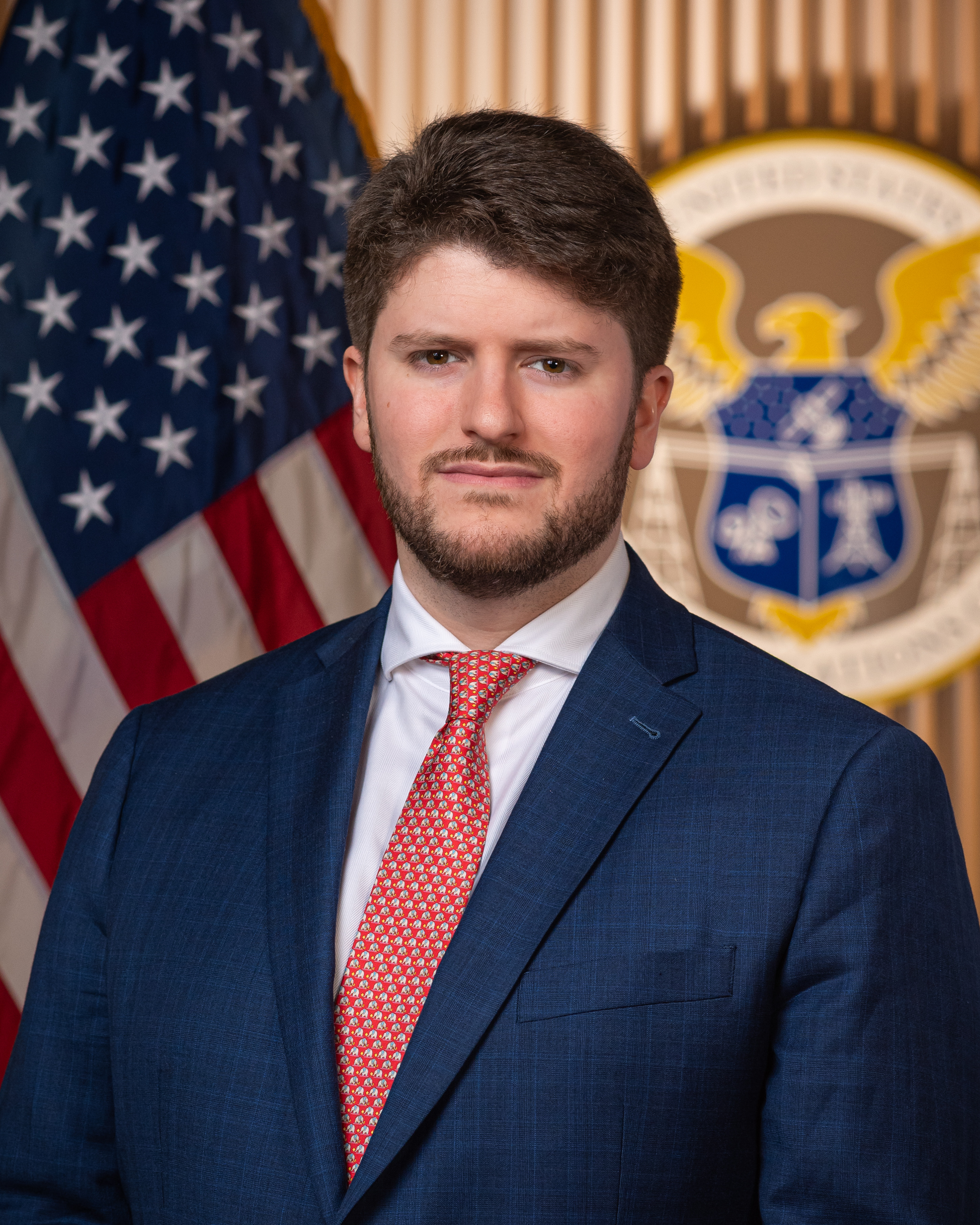
- Official portrait, 2025

76th President of the New York Young Republican Club
- In office April 18, 2019 – April 6, 2025
- Preceded by: Melissa Marovich
- Succeeded by: Stefano Forte

Personal details
- Born: Gavin Mario Wax; December 1993 (age 32)
- Spouse: Chelsea Hall (m. 2024)
- Children: 2

Gavin Mario Wax (born 1993) is an American political operative and government official who has served as chief of staff in the Office of the Under Secretary of State for Public Diplomacy and Public Affairs since August 2025. He initially served under acting Under Secretary Darren Beattie and continued in the position following the Senate confirmation of Sarah B. Rogers on October 7, 2025. Previously, Wax served as chief of staff and senior advisor to Federal Communications Commission Commissioner Nathan Simington from March to August 2025. He was president of the New York Young Republican Club from 2019 to 2025.

== Early life and education (1993–2017) ==
Gavin Mario Wax was born in December 1993. He is of Jewish descent and his grandmother, Pina Frassineti, along with her mother and brother, evaded Nazis in World War II by posing as Italian nuns for two years. Frassineti's grandfather was killed at Auschwitz concentration camp; other relatives were killed at Dachau. Frassineti moved from Rome to New York City near the end of the war.

== Career ==
=== Early political involvement (2017–2019) ===
By November 2016, Wax had served as editor-in-chief of Liberty Conservative, and by March 2017, Wax was a member of the Metropolitan Republican Club.

In October 2018, Wax attended an event hosted by Gavin McInnes, founder of the neo-fascist Proud Boys. Following an altercation at the event between the Proud Boys and left-wing protesters, Wax wrote an editorial for American Thinker suggesting the Proud Boys had unfairly been tarred as extremist, saying that McInnes "just runs a patriotic fraternal group who like America and beer... We are all Proud Boys now." He further decried "leftist terrorist" attacks on conservatives.

=== New York Young Republican Club and marketing work (2019–2025) ===
In 2019, Wax was elected president of the New York Young Republican Club. He marked his tenure with a sharp shift towards Trumpism; the organization was the first charter of Young Republicans to endorse Donald Trump in his 2024 presidential campaign. In 2020, Wax began hosting a podcast named "NYYRC Live", his first guest was far-right British commentator Katie Hopkins. Wax also appeared on a podcast, hosted by John Derbyshire, which was affiliated with white nationalist organization VDare.

In 2022, Gavin Wax spoke at a "Western Renewal" summit in Hungary, a conference hosted by CPAC. Numerous xenophobic far-right European political parties participated in the event. Wax is a member of Republicans for National Renewal, which helped organize the summit. In December 2022, Wax spoke at the annual gala of the NYYRC, in which members of VDARE and other far-right figures were in attendance, including Jack Posobiec and Steve Bannon.

Wax worked for Gettr's marketing department. In 2024, he married Chelsea Hall, the former communications chair of the NYYRC. Wax resigned from the presidency of the NYYRC in April 2025 to spend more time with his wife his and six-month-old child. He was succeeded by Stefano Forte.

=== Trump administration positions and group chat leak (2025–present) ===
In April 2025, Wax became the chief of staff to Federal Communications Commission commissioner Nathan Simington. After Simington resigned in June, Wax became the chief of staff to Darren Beattie, the acting under secretary of state for public diplomacy and public affairs, in August.

Peter Giunta, the president of the New York State Young Republicans, faced criticism over a deposit for a party held at the National Women's Republican Club in December 2023; Giunta later resigned and blamed the ire of the club on his criticism of Wax. In October, Politico obtained thousands of messages from leaders of Young Republican charters. Michael Bartels, a senior advisor in the Office of the General Counsel for the Small Business Administration, claimed in a notarized affidavit that Wax had provided the messages to Politico, an assertion corroborated by Giunta.

== Views ==
=== Advocacy ===
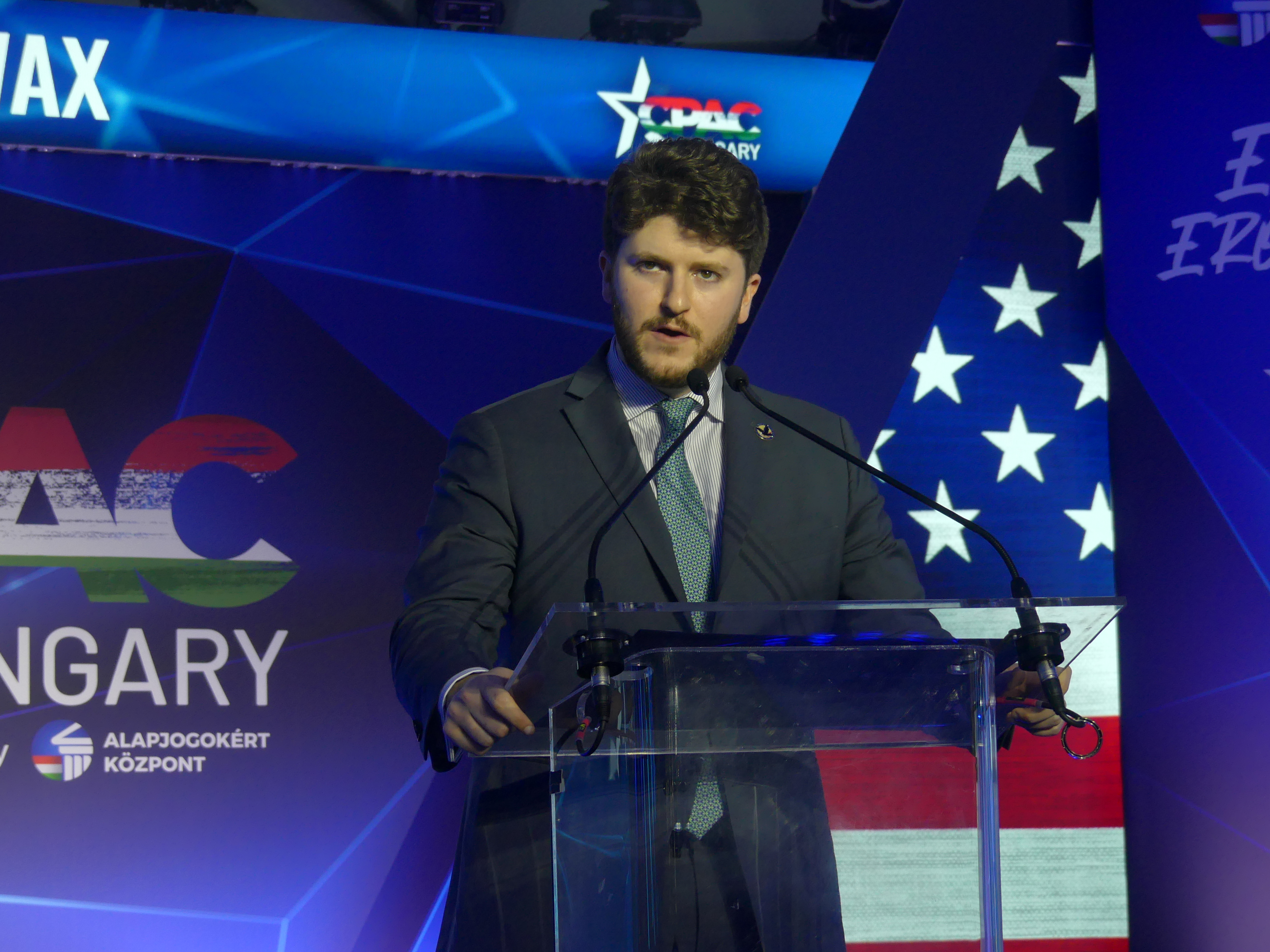
Wax speaking at CPAC Hungary in 2023

In June 2020, Wax publicly defended Equestrian Statue of Theodore Roosevelt amid a wave of removals of offensive statues following the murder of George Floyd. At CPAC Hungary in 2022, he disavowed military assistance sent to Ukraine and the "nonstop media propaganda pushing for World War III".

=== Political support ===
In January 2022, Wax criticized Donald Trump's endorsements of Morgan Ortagus and Greg Abbott. In September, Wax donated $500 to George Santos' joint fundraising committee; Santos personally called Wax after reports that he had embellished his biography. Prior to the Chinese businessman Guo Wengui's indictment, Wax defended Wengui.

== Works cited ==
=== Articles ===
- Asbury, John (January 13, 2025). "Baldwin woman, 100, who survived the Holocaust by hiding in a convent, is honored as part of Holocaust Remembrance Day". Newsday.
- Barrett, Paul (November 22, 2016). "Elon Musk vs. the Trolls". Bloomberg News.
- Beeferman, Jason (September 26, 2025). "Scandal in the NYS Young Republicans". Politico.
- Beeferman, Jason; Ngo, Emily (October 14, 2025). "'I love Hitler': Leaked messages expose Young Republicans' racist chat". Politico.
- Coltin, Jeff; Reisman, Nick; Ngo, Emily (November 21, 2024). "An unconventional NYPD pick". Politico.
- "Former Commissioner Prospect Wax Joins State Department". Export Compliance Daily. August 28, 2025.
- Freedlander, David (June 2, 2023). "How a Staunchly Blue State Let MAGA Seep In". Politico Magazine.
- Friedman, Dan (July 6, 2023). "Far-Right Influencers Defended an Accused Fraudster. They Had Help". Mother Jones.
- Goldmacher, Shane (January 31, 2022). "Trump's Grip on G.O.P. Faces New Strains". The New York Times.
- Higgins, Andrew; Novak, Benjamin (May 19, 2022). "In Hungary, Cheap Russian Oil Fuels Right-Wing Culture Wars". The New York Times.
- Krichevsky, Sophie (April 9, 2025). "New York Young Republicans have a new leader". City & State.
- Mencimer, Stephanie (April 19, 2025). "Far-Right Activist Who Vowed "Retribution" Lands Role at the FCC". Mother Jones.
- Przybyla, Heidi; Marsh, Julia; Piper, Jessica (January 20, 2023). "Santos leans on group with white nationalist ties". Politico.
- Small, Zachary (June 28, 2020). "Defenders of Roosevelt Statue Converge on Natural History Museum". The New York Times.
- Vilensky, Mike; Gay, Mara (March 12, 2017). "Republican New York Council Member May Test Anti-Trump Election Waters". The Wall Street Journal.
- Weisman, Jonathan (December 14, 2022). "A New York Gala Draws Incoming G.O.P. Lawmakers, and Extremists". The New York Times.

=== Documents ===
- "Gavin M Wax in the U.S., Index to Public Records, 1994-2019" (Document). Index to Public Records.
