= Republicans for National Renewal =

American political advocacy group

- Republicans For National Renewal Inc
- Formation: 2020; 6 years ago
- Founder: Mark Ivanyo
- Type: Nonprofit
- Tax ID no.: 61-1945151
- Legal status: Political organization
- Purpose: Conservatism
- Headquarters: Dover, Delaware
- Location: United States
- Origins: CPAC 2020
- Executive Director: Mark Ivanyo
- Political Director: Chris Betts
- Eastern Regional Director: Seth Segal
- Affiliations: Republican Party
- Website: rnrenewal.org

Republicans for National Renewal is an American political advocacy group and 501(c)(4) organization. A right-wing group, it describes itself as national-populists.

== History ==
The 501(c)(4) organization, Republicans for National Renewal, was founded in February 2020. The organization's launch party featured guests such as Corey Stewart, Paul Gosar, and Eduardo Bolsonaro. Some journalists were ejected from the event. The group has been described as being "Pro-Trump" and "Trump friendly." Gazeta do Povo described the organization as "an arm of the Republican Party". The organization advocates for religious and family values, and is considered to be generally conservative.

In October 2020, Isabella DeLuca, the Outreach Director for Republicans for National Renewal, was assaulted during a protest in Washington, D.C.

In August 2021, Republicans for National Renewal hosted the Inaugural Transatlantic Patriot Summit, which was attended by American conservatives and members of several far-right European political parties, several of which belonging to the Identity and Democracy group in the European Parliament. Leaders of Young Republican groups, including Peter Giunta and Gavin Wax, on behalf of Republicans for National Renewal signed off on a statement calling for increased border security, protection of the "traditional family unit", and opposing censorship of politically incorrect speech.

In December 2021, the group's Christmas party, which took place in Phoenix, Arizona, was attended by Gosar, Louie Gohmert, Matt Gaetz, Mike Collins, Kari Lake, Blake Masters, Wendy Rogers, Mark Finchem, Anthony Sabatini, Anthony Kern, James O'Keefe and Jack Posobiec.

In March 2022, the organization planned a daylong event in Lansing, Michigan, but a portion of the event slated to take place at a local brewery was canceled following online backlash and public pressure. Shane Trejo, the grassroots director for Republicans for National Renewal, spoke at the rally. Trejo had previously hosted the far-right podcast Blood Soil and Liberty alongside Alex Witoslawski, a member of the defunct white supremacist organization Identity Evropa. Trejo spoke at the event despite claims from organizers white nationalists would not be in attendance.

In April 2022, the organization received a letter of support from Hungarian Prime Minister Viktor Orbán, pledging to strengthen cooperation between the group and Orbán's Fidesz party.

The group endorsed a multitude of political candidates in the 2022 United States elections.

In July 2024, Donald Trump indicated support for the organization during its efforts to influence the Republican Party platform.

During 2025, Republicans for National Renewal was among groups advocating for a third term for President Donald Trump, hosting an X space in April with U.S. Rep. Andy Ogles to discuss the issue.

In January 2026, the group hosted an gala at the Kennedy Center where U.S. Representatives Anna Paulina Luna, Ogles and Abraham Hamadeh sliced a cake depicting Greenland, amid the ongoing Greenland crisis.

In March 2026, the organization featured former commander-at-large of the U.S. Border Patrol Greg Bovino and Republican congressional candidates Steve Toth and Brandon Herrera at an event in Grapevine, Texas.

== Endorsements ==
=== President ===
Home State	Candidate	Year	Primary Result
Florida	Donald Trump	2024	Nominee

=== Party elections ===
State	Position	Candidate	Year	Result
(Georgia (U.S. state)) Georgia	Georgia GOP Chair	Josh McKoon	2023	Elected
Arizona	Arizona GOP Chair	Jeff DeWit	2023	Elected
Michigan	Michigan GOP Youth Chair	Parker Shonts	2023	Lost election
(Georgia (U.S. state)) Georgia	Georgia GOP Vice Chair	Brant Frost	2023	Lost election
Michigan	Michigan GOP Chair	Matt DePerno	2023	Lost election
(United States) National	Republican National Committee Chair	Harmeet Dhillon	2023	Lost election
Nevada	NV GOP National Committeewoman	Sigal Chattah	2023	Elected

=== Senate elections ===
==== 2024 senate elections ====
State	Candidate	Primary Date	Seat Status	Primary Result	Election result
Arizona	Kari Lake	August 6, 2024	Challenger	Nominated	Lost election

==== 2022 runoff senate elections ====
State	Candidate	Election Date	Seat Status	Result
(Georgia (U.S. state)) Georgia	Herschel Walker	December 6, 2022	Challenger	Lost election

==== 2022 senate elections ====
State	Candidate	Primary Date	Seat Status	Primary result	Election result
Alabama	Mo Brooks	May 24, 2022	Open seat	Lost election	
Oklahoma	Jackson Lahmeyer	June 28, 2022	Challenger	Lost election	
Arizona	Blake Masters	August 2, 2022	Challenger	Nominated	Lost election
Missouri	Eric Greitens	August 2, 2022	Open seat	Lost election	
New Hampshire	Don Bolduc	September 13, 2022	Challenger	Nominated	Lost election

=== House elections ===
==== 2024 House elections ====
District	Candidate	Primary Date	Seat Status	Primary Result
(Texas) TX-25	Matthew Lucci	March 1, 2024	Challenger	Lost election
(Texas) TX-26	Brandon Gill	March 1, 2024	Open seat	Nominated
(Alabama) AL-1	Barry Moore	March 5, 2024	Open seat	Nominated
(North Carolina) NC-10	Pat Harrigan	March 5, 2024	Open seat	Nominated
(Indiana) IN-03	Marlin Stutzman	May 7, 2024	Open seat	Nominated
(California) CA-20	David Giglio	June 14, 2024	Challenger	Lost election
(Oklahoma) OK-04	Paul Bondar	June 18, 2024	Challenger	Lost election
(Colorado) CO-04	Lauren Boebert	June 25, 2024	Open seat	Nominated
(Arizona) AZ-02	Eli Crane	July 30, 2024	Incumbent	Nominated
(Arizona) AZ-08	Abraham Hamadeh	July 30, 2024	Open seat	Nominated
(Arizona) AZ-09	Paul Gosar	July 30, 2024	Incumbent	Nominated
(Missouri) MO-03	Bob Onder	August 6, 2024	Challenger	Nominated
(Missouri) MO-07	Eric Burlison	August 6, 2024	Incumbent	Nominated
(Washington (state)) WA-03	Joe Kent	August 6, 2024	Challenger	Advanced (Note: Washington conducts elections using a nonpartisan blanket primary.)
(Washington (state)) WA-04	Jerrod Sessler	August 6, 2024	Challenger	Advanced
(Wisconsin) WI-08	Tony Wied	August 13, 2024	Challenger	Nominated
(Florida) FL-01	Matt Gaetz	August 20, 2024	Incumbent	Nominated
(Florida) FL-07	Cory Mills	August 20, 2024	Incumbent	Nominated
(Florida) FL-10	Willie Montague	August 20, 2024	Challenger	Nominated
(Florida) FL-13	Anna Paulina Luna	August 20, 2024	Incumbent	Nominated
(Florida) FL-25	Bryan Leib	August 20, 2024	Challenger	Lost election

==== 2023 Speaker election ====
District	Candidate	Year	Primary Result
Arizona	Andy Biggs	2023	Lost election

==== 2022 House elections ====
District	Candidate	Primary Date	Seat Status	Primary result	Election result
(Texas) TX-03	Suzanne Harp	March 1, 2022	Open seat	Lost election	
(Washington (state)) WA-03	Joe Kent	August 2, 2022	Challenger	Advanced (Note: Alaska and Washington conduct congressional elections using a nonpartisan blanket primary.)	Lost election
(Ohio) OH-09	JR Majewski	May 3, 2022	Challenger	Nominated	Lost election
(Ohio) OH-07	Max Miller	May 3, 2022	Open seat	Nominated	Elected
(Ohio) OH-13	Christina Hagan	May 3, 2022	Challenger	Did not run	
(North Carolina) NC-11	Madison Cawthorn	May 17, 2022	Incumbent	Lost election	
(North Carolina) NC-13	Bo Hines	May 17, 2022	Open seat	Nominated	Lost election
(Alabama) AL-05	Casey Wardynski	May 24, 2022	Open seat	Lost runoff	
(Georgia (U.S. state)) GA-09	Andrew Clyde	May 24, 2022	Incumbent	Nominated	Elected
(Georgia (U.S. state)) GA-10	Mike Collins	May 24, 2022	Incumbent	Nominated	Elected
(Georgia (U.S. state)) GA-14	Marjorie Taylor Greene	May 24, 2022	Incumbent	Nominated	Elected
(Mississippi) MS-04	Mike Ezell	June 7, 2022	Challenger	Nominated	Elected
(New Jersey) NJ-04	Mike Crispi	June 7, 2022	Challenger	Lost election	
(Nevada) NV-01	Carolina Serrano	June 14, 2022	Challenger	Lost election	
(Nevada) NV-03	Noah Malgeri	June 14, 2022	Challenger	Lost election	
(Nevada) NV-04	Sam Peters	June 14, 2022	Challenger	Nominated	Lost election
(Virginia) VA-02	Jarome Bell	June 21, 2022	Challenger	Lost election	
(Virginia) VA-10	Hung Cao	June 21, 2022	Challenger	Nominated	Lost election
(Colorado) CO-03	Lauren Boebert	June 28, 2022	Incumbent	Nominated	Elected
(Oklahoma) OK-02	John R. Bennett	June 28, 2022	Open seat	Lost election	
(Arizona) AZ-05	Andy Biggs	August 2, 2022	Incumbent	Nominated	Elected
(Arizona) AZ-06	Kelly Townsend	August 2, 2022	Open seat	Dropped out	
(Arizona) AZ-09	Paul Gosar	August 2, 2022	Incumbent	Nominated	Elected
(Michigan) MI-02	Tom Norton	August 2, 2022	Challenger	Lost election	
(Michigan) MI-03	John Gibbs	August 2, 2022	Challenger	Nominated	Lost election
(Michigan) MI-06	Steve Carra	August 2, 2022	Challenger	Dropped out	
(Tennessee) TN-05	Robby Starbuck	August 4, 2022	Open seat	Removed from ballot	
(Minnesota) MN-01	Jeremy Munson	August 9, 2022	Challenger	Lost election	
(Alaska) AK-AL	Sarah Palin	August 16, 2022	Open seat	Advanced	Lost election
(Florida) FL-01	Matt Gaetz	August 23, 2022	Incumbent	Nominated	Elected
(Florida) FL-07	Anthony Sabatini	August 23, 2022	Challenger	Lost election	
(Florida) FL-11	Laura Loomer	August 23, 2022	Challenger	Lost election	
(New York (state)) NY-23	Carl Paladino	August 23, 2022	Open seat	Lost election	
(New York (state)) NY-24	Andrew McCarthy	August 23, 2022	Open seat	Withdrew	
(New Hampshire) NH-01	Karoline Leavitt	September 13, 2022	Challenger	Nominated	Lost election
(New Hampshire) NH-02	Robert Burns	September 13, 2022	Challenger	Nominated	Lost election

=== State office ===
==== State executive ====
===== 2022 Governor elections =====
State	Candidate	Primary Date	Seat Status	Primary result	Election result
Nebraska	Charles Herbster	May 10, 2022	Open seat	Lost election	
Pennsylvania	Doug Mastriano	May 17, 2022	Open seat	Nominated	Lost election
Idaho	Janice McGeachin	May 17, 2022	Challenger	Lost election	
Arizona	Kari Lake	August 2, 2022	Open seat	Nominated	Lost election
Florida	Ron DeSantis	August 23, 2022	Incumbent	Nominated	Elected

===== 2022 State executive elections =====
State	Office	Candidate	Primary Date	Seat Status	Primary Result
Texas	Texas Attorney General	Ken Paxton	March 1, 2022	Incumbent	Elected
Texas	Land Commissioner of Texas	Dawn Buckingham	March 1, 2022	Incumbent	Elected
Texas	Agriculture Commissioner	Sid Miller	March 1, 2022	Incumbent	Elected
(Georgia (U.S. state)) Georgia	Insurance Commissioner	Patrick Witt	May 24, 2022	Open seat	Lost election
(Georgia (U.S. state)) Georgia	Secretary of State	Jody Hice	May 24, 2022	Challenger	Lost election
Nevada	Attorney General	Sigal Chattah	June 14, 2022	Open seat	Lost election
Nevada	State Treasurer	Michele Fiore	June 14, 2022	Open seat	Lost election
Nevada	Secretary of State	Jim Marchant	June 14, 2022	Open seat	Lost election
Arizona	Secretary of State	Mark Finchem	August 2, 2022	Open seat	Lost election
Arizona	Attorney General	Abe Hamadeh	August 2, 2022	Open seat	Lost election
Kansas	Attorney General	Kris Kobach	August 2, 2022	Open seat	Elected
Michigan	Secretary of State	Kristina Karamo	August 2, 2022	Challenger	Lost election
Michigan	Attorney General	Matt DePerno	August 2, 2022	Challenger	Lost election
Florida	Attorney General	Ashley Moody	August 23, 2022	Incumbent	Elected

==== Local elections ====
===== 2022 local elections =====
State	Office	Candidate	Primary Date	Seat Status	Primary Result
Texas	Harris County Judge	Alex Mealer	March 1, 2022	Challenger	Lost election

==== State legislator ====
===== 2022 State legislator elections =====
State	Candidate	Office	Year	Primary Result
Texas	Tony Tinderholt	Speaker of the Texas House of Representatives	2022	Lost election
Iowa	Jeff Shipley	Iowa state representative	2022	Elected
Texas	Nate Schatzline	Texas state representative	2022	Elected
Tennessee	Tommy Vallejos	Tennessee state representative	2022	Lost election
Arizona	Steve Montenegro	Arizona state representative	2022	Elected
Arizona	Austin Smith	Arizona state representative	2022	Elected
Arizona	Anthony Kern	Arizona state senator	2022	Elected
Arizona	Wendy Rogers	Arizona state senator	2022	Elected
Michigan	Jacky Eubanks	Michigan state representative	2022	Lost election
Michigan	Chad Moore	Michigan state representative	2022	Lost election
South Carolina	Alex Foppoli	South Carolina state representative	2022	Lost election
Missouri	Chris Lonsdale	Missouri state representative	2022	Elected
(New York (state)) New York	Stefano Forte	New York state representative	2022	Lost election
Florida	Brian Clowdus	Florida state representative	2023	Lost election

== Leadership ==
The organization is chaired by Kerry Bentivolio, who served as the congressman representing Michigan's 11th congressional district from 2013 to 2015. Mark Ivanyo is the organization's executive director.
