= Lucian Wintrich =

American writer and speaker (born 1988)

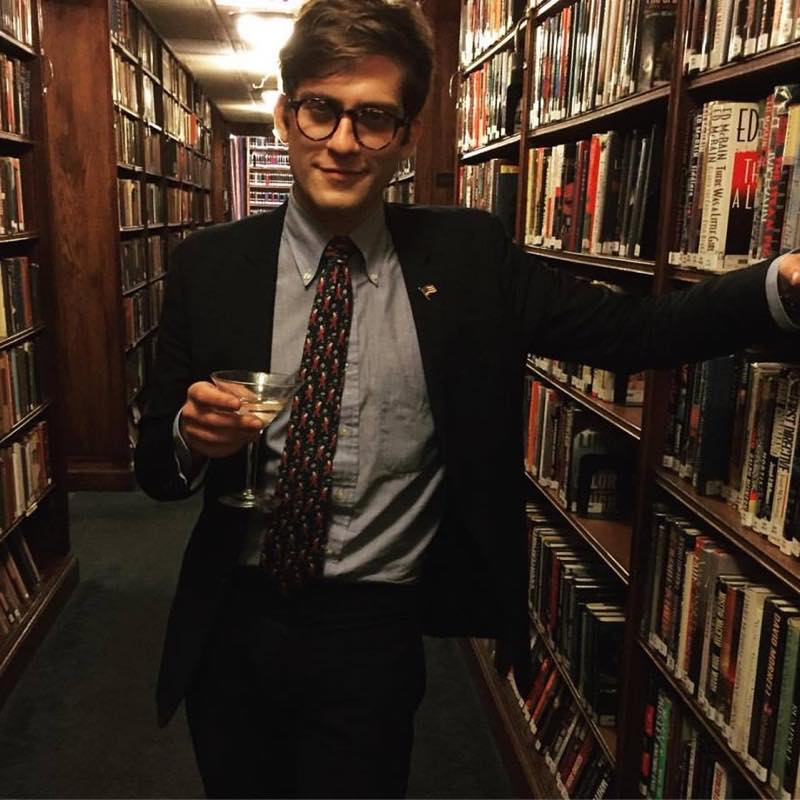
- Lucian Wintrich in New York City
- Born: Lucian Baxter Einhorn; May 24, 1988 (age 38); Pittsburgh, Pennsylvania, U.S.
- Education: Bard College
- Occupations: Artist, writer, photographer, strategist
- Notable work: Twinks4Trump (2016), #DaddyWillSaveUs (2016)
- Political party: Republican (2012–present)
- Other political affiliations: Libertarian (2007–2012)
- Website: wintrichfornewyork.com

Lucian Baxter Wintrich IV (né Einhorn; born May 24, 1988) is an American artist, photographer, writer, and media strategist. He received widespread attention in 2017 as the White House correspondent for the conservative news and opinion site The Gateway Pundit. At age 28, he was one of the youngest members of the White House Press Corps, and among the first to be openly gay. During this time, Wintrich attracted significant controversy for his outspoken views on politics and culture.

Wintrich served on the Board of Governors of the New York Young Republican Club and held the roles of Media Chairman and Press Chairman. He was removed as Press Chairman after the club's December 2025 gala; the club sued him in January 2026, initially seeking $5 million. He launched a campaign for New York's 12th congressional district in the 2026 U.S. House election.

== Early life ==
Wintrich was born Lucian Baxter Einhorn on May 24th, 1988, in Pittsburgh in Pittsburgh, Pennsylvania, and grew up in Squirrel Hill, a residential neighborhood in the East End of the city. He is the eldest son; his mother is an experimental filmmaker and painter, and his father owned a multimedia design and advertising firm. As a child, he was a member of the Pittsburgh Scholastic Chess League. In the fall of 2005, while still in high school, Wintrich created the podcast "Acorns & Merlot," characterized by the Pittsburgh Post Gazette as "sometimes irreverent or crude [but] often hilarious." Reflecting on his upbringing, Wintrich said, "I wasn't necessarily popular because I was always considered a somewhat subversive of a person to know, I was always running different media projects".

At the age of 18, Wintrich underwent a legal name change, choosing to revert to a historic fraternal family surname. He also adopted the suffix IV, saying that "Lucian Wintrich" was already "humorously pretentious sounding" and that the suffix would "make it all the funnier."

His paternal grandfather, Jerzy Einhorn, a Jewish medical doctor, born in Sosnowiec, Poland, served as a cavalry officer in the Polish resistance before being promoted to lieutenant colonel by the Polish Ministry of Defense. Many of Wintrich's European ancestors were executed during the Second World War, some for their Jewish ancestry and others as members of the aristocracy.

== Education ==
Wintrich attended the experimental prep school Fanny Edel Falk Laboratory School and later Taylor Allderdice High School. In 2007, he entered Bard College in Annandale-on-Hudson, New York. Wintrich studied political science under Walter Russell Mead after being barred from the film department at school.

In 2010, while attending Bard College, Wintrich started The Bard Tribune, an online publication featuring news, commentary and satire. He said he created the site out of dissatisfaction with the college's student newspaper. His thesis was titled "Electronic Democracy and Electronic Propaganda: The New Media as a Political Tool." Wintrich graduated in 2012 with a B.A in Political Science.

== Career ==
Wintrich worked as a digital strategist for the advertising agency Anomaly and as a party host at New York City nightclubs. In an op-ed for The Hill, Wintrich recounted being dismissed from his position at Anomaly for his political views, and had been up for a promotion before his dismissal. Wintrich sued Anomaly for wrongful termination and reached an out-of-court settlement. Wintrich co-founded Rabble Media and served as its creative director; the outlet described itself as a media brand providing original reporting and "underserved stories."

In August 2016, Wintrich wrote an op-ed for The Advocate on media portrayals of gay conservatives.

=== Photography ===
In 2016, Wintrich created "Twinks4Trump", a controversial photo series that featured young, slim, and often shirtless gay men known as "twinks" wearing "Make America Great Again" baseball caps, which were associated with Donald Trump's presidential campaign. Primarily shot in his East Village apartment, the photos were intended to challenge both the religious right and the progressive left, provoking discussions around sexuality, politics, and identity. The series premiered at the "Wake Up!" event during the Republican National Convention in Cleveland. The event, described by Rolling Stone as a gathering of trolls, aimed to provide an alternative perspective to the mainstream convention proceedings. Wintrich's photos served as a backdrop for speeches delivered by controversial figures such as Pamela Geller, Geert Wilders, Jim Hoft, and Milo Yiannopoulos.

The series received mixed reactions from both supporters and critics. Supporters praised it for its audacity and for challenging societal norms and political conventions. However, critics argued that the series was a shallow and attention-seeking attempt, lacking artistic merit and engaging in superficial political commentary. Some detractors also accused Wintrich of co-opting gay culture and exploiting it for political purposes. In an op-ed for The Art Newspaper, Dan Duray derided Wintrich's work as "Ryan McGinley but without any sense of balance, color depth, technical acuity, texture, lighting, warmth, joie de vivre, basic humanity and sexiness, and add Make America Great Again hats."

=== Art curation ===
Wintrich organized and curated the "#DaddyWillSaveUs" art exhibition in late 2016, billed by Wintrich as the first conservative and pro-Trump art show in the United States. The exhibition featured a range of artworks that explored various themes related to conservative values, political commentary, and societal dynamics. Wintrich and the artists aimed to challenge the perceived dominance of left-leaning ideologies in contemporary art.

Featuring an array of artists and contributors, notable pieces included paintings depicting George Washington and Martin Luther King Jr. donning pro-Trump hats, and an "Emotional First Aid Kit" contributed by James O'Keefe. Martin Shkreli displayed a single pill with a $20,000 price tag, a reference to his negative public image. Additional pieces included a photo triptych by Vice founder Gavin McInnes, an experimental film by Sebastian Sommer, and a controversial performance art piece showcasing Milo Yiannopoulos bathing in pig blood.

Attendees of the exhibition enjoyed the amenities of an open bar, while deliberately provocative elements, such as mini taco bowls and mini gold-flaked egg roll hors d'oeuvres, were served by individuals wearing costumes that some sources deemed racially insensitive.

Funding for the exhibition was raised through a crowdfunding campaign on Indiegogo, as well as private donor contributions, totaling $22,500. Initially slated to take place at Boiler (Pierogi Gallery), the event encountered a setback when the owner, Joe Amrhein, canceled his contract with Wintrich. In a statement to Artnet News, Amrhein expressed his change of heart, stating that although he initially found the idea of a satirical show about Trump appealing, he believed Wintrich's genuine belief in the cause made it impossible for them to proceed. Wintrich responded by expressing his disappointment in Amrhein's decision and attributing it to pressure from others in the art community. As a result, the exhibition was held at Wallplay Gallery in Manhattan's SoHo neighborhood.

Originally, Wintrich intended to donate 30% of the art show's proceeds to the American Military Partners Association, an LGBTQ veteran group, but they declined the contribution.

The exhibition garnered significant attention but was met with heavy criticism from various outlets. Critics questioned the artistic merit of the show, and accused Wintrich of manipulating the media for political gain.

The significance of the exhibition earned it a spot on ArtNet's list of "Art that mattered from the 2016 Presidential election," and W Magazine recognized it as one of the "Feuds That Fueled the Art World's Gossip Mill in 2016." The art show was later featured in the 2021 documentary Pharma Bro.

=== White House correspondent ===
While attending the Republican National Convention in 2016, Wintrich befriended Jim Hoft, the founder of St Louis based publication Gateway Pundit. The day before Donald Trump's inauguration, Wintrich was appointed as the inaugural White House correspondent for the Gateway Pundit. Wintrich described his role in the White House Press Corps as "performance art" and said his position served two purposes: "writing about dry policy stuff" and "trolling the media."

He spawned the "#FireColbert" movement, wherein he characterized the night show host's joke involving Trump and Vladimir Putin in a gay relationship as a "disgusting 12-minute homophobic rant" He frequently used social media to criticize and mock mainstream press outlets for having what he perceived as biases and shortcomings. While in Washington, Wintrich became the public face of Gateway Pundit, generating press and news stories in other publications.

On February 15, 2017, Wintrich was scheduled to speak to the College Republicans at New York University (NYU), but the talk was postponed over security concerns. On March 23, 2017, he addressed the NYU College Republicans.

On March 10, 2017, Wintrich was confronted by a fellow White House correspondent, Jon Decker of Fox News in the White House Briefing Room, who loudly accused Wintrich of being a white supremacist. After the briefing, April Ryan of American Urban Radio Networks approached Wintrich with a live camera and questioned him whether or not he was a racist. Ben Jacobs of The Guardian described Wintrich engaging with Ryan as him "holding his own briefing because nothing matters." At a subsequent panel discussion at Columbia University, Wintrich called Decker a "Nazi homophobe".

In May 2017, Wintrich encountered Malia Obama at the now defunct Parlor club in Soho, New York. Malia Obama ran up to confront Wintrich at the private social club; Wintrich told Jennifer Mass of Hollywood Life, "I started laughing. I turned around and it was Malia Obama staring me down so I tried to snap a picture while she was staring me down and she came up to me and started yelling."

On November 28, 2017, Wintrich was arrested after an altercation in which he, as an invited guest speaker, was lecturing at the podium, when a woman came up heckling and ultimately snatched the written copy of his speech directly from the lectern during a talk at the University of Connecticut entitled "It's OK to Be White". He was initially charged with breach of peace. In December 2017, the charges against Wintrich were dropped and the woman who took the papers, Quinebaug Valley Community College advisor Catherine Gregory, was charged with attempted sixth-degree larceny and disorderly conduct. Gregory was freed after posting $1,000 bail on charges of attempted larceny and disorderly conduct. She stated through her attorney that she took Wintrich's speech as a form of protest. The charges against her were later dropped after she agreed to a one-year campus ban and a $500 donation to the university.

In January 2018, it was revealed that Wintrich was close associates with Chelsea Manning. Outings for the two included an "Escape Room" in Washington, DC and cocktail parties at Wintrich's Washington, DC, apartment where journalists and public figures would play Cards Against Humanity. Manning’s socializing with right-wing figures drew criticism from some on the left.

In February 2018, Wintrich tweeted the conspiracy theory that some survivors of the Stoneman Douglas High School shooting, who had spoken to the media about gun control in the wake of the tragedy, were "trained actors who were recruited by [George] Soros-linked organizations as spokespeople after a crisis." The tweet was liked by Donald Trump Jr. but was much criticized by others, including shooting survivor David Hogg, whom Wintrich accused of being "heavily coached" for interviews. Wintrich defended his claim in Vanity Fair and showed incredulity at the supposed skills of his detractors.

In August 2018, Wintrich engaged in a debate on America First, an online show hosted by Nick Fuentes, tackling immigration and anti-white racism. Coinciding with Wintrich's appearance, Right Wing Watch promptly published a detailed account of the event, while Gateway Pundit founder Jim Hoft took to Twitter to announce that Wintrich had parted ways with the organization several weeks prior.

Following this episode, Wintrich took to Periscope for a live stream, connecting with his supporters while preparing to cook two lobsters, one of which he named Jared Holt, after the reporter from Right Wing Watch who had actively publicized Wintrich's participation on Fuentes's program.

=== New York Republican politics ===
By June 2022, Wintrich was serving on the New York Young Republican Club's Board of Governors. He subsequently held the roles of Media Chairman and Press Chairman, the latter until December 2025. Vanity Fair described Wintrich as the club's "de facto creative director."

In March 2023, Wintrich coordinated a New York Young Republican Club party featuring Roger Stone and the hosts of the Red Scare podcast.

At the club's December 2023 gala at Cipriani Wall Street, headlined by Donald Trump, he challenged a rule barring reporters from speaking with guests. Club president Gavin Wax subsequently allowed reporter Caleb Ecarma to mingle with attendees. In a 2024 Guardian interview, Wintrich criticized younger conservatives’ reliance on influencers instead of independent reading and thought.

Stefano Forte succeeded Gavin Wax as club president in April 2025. At the club's December 13, 2025, gala, Wintrich objected to reporters being confined to a press pen and called the event "the worst event they've ever thrown." He was removed as Press Chairman a few days later.

On January 14, 2026, the club filed New York Young Republicans Club, Inc. v. Lucian Baxter Wintrich IV in New York Supreme Court, New York County. The complaint alleged that his gala remark and later statements breached non-disparagement and confidentiality provisions, and that subsequent podcast statements were defamatory; it initially sought at least $5 million. Wintrich described his remarks as opinion and characterized the suit as an effort to deter criticism and financial oversight.

In April 2026, the club sought leave to amend its complaint, citing a WVFP New York City podcast appearance released on March 23 in which, according to the application, Wintrich mocked the lawsuit and repeated criticisms of the club's finances. The proposed amendment alleged further defamation and breaches of confidentiality and included an additional $1 million damages request, bringing the specified amounts sought to at least $6 million.

In July 2026, Wintrich arranged for an LED billboard truck displaying satirical images of Stefano Forte and parodies of the club's logo and merchandise to park outside its America 250 Freedom Mixer.

=== 2026 U.S. House campaign ===
Wintrich's campaign for New York's 12th congressional district in the 2026 U.S. House election used the name "New York First." His principal campaign committee, Wintrich for New York, registered with the Federal Election Commission on December 1, 2025. In an amended Statement of Candidacy filed on March 25, 2026, he listed his affiliation as Independent.
