= John Decker =

John Decker may refer to:

- John Decker (artist) (1895–1947), painter, set designer and caricaturist in Hollywood
- John Decker (fire chief) (1823–1892), American businessman, politician and firefighter
- John Parkes Decker (c. 1840s–c. 1890s), pioneering West African photographer
- John A. Decker (died 2006), Chief Judge of the Wisconsin Court of Appeals
- Jon Decker, White House correspondent for Fox News Radio
