= 2024 United States Senate election in Arizona =

- November 5, 2024
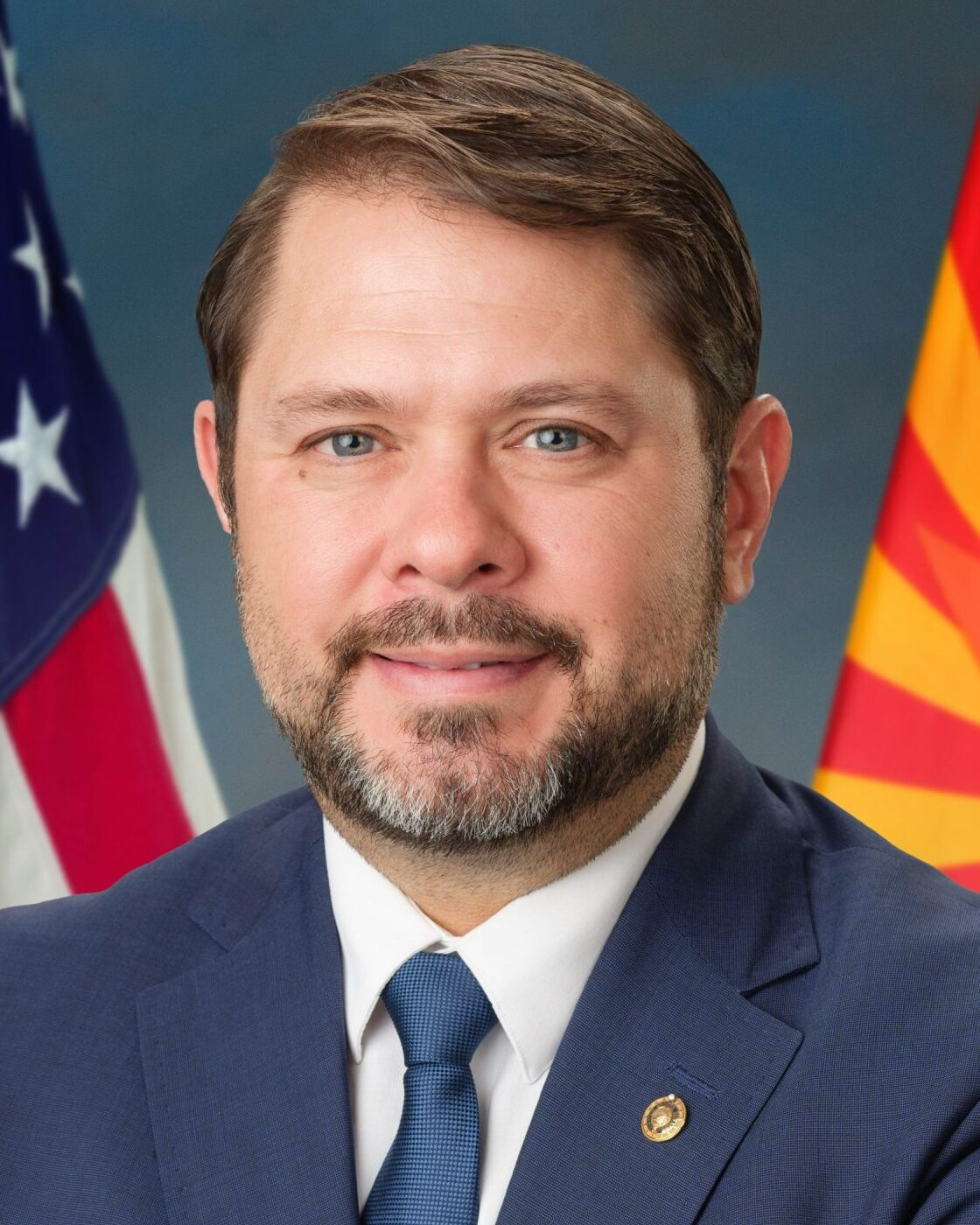

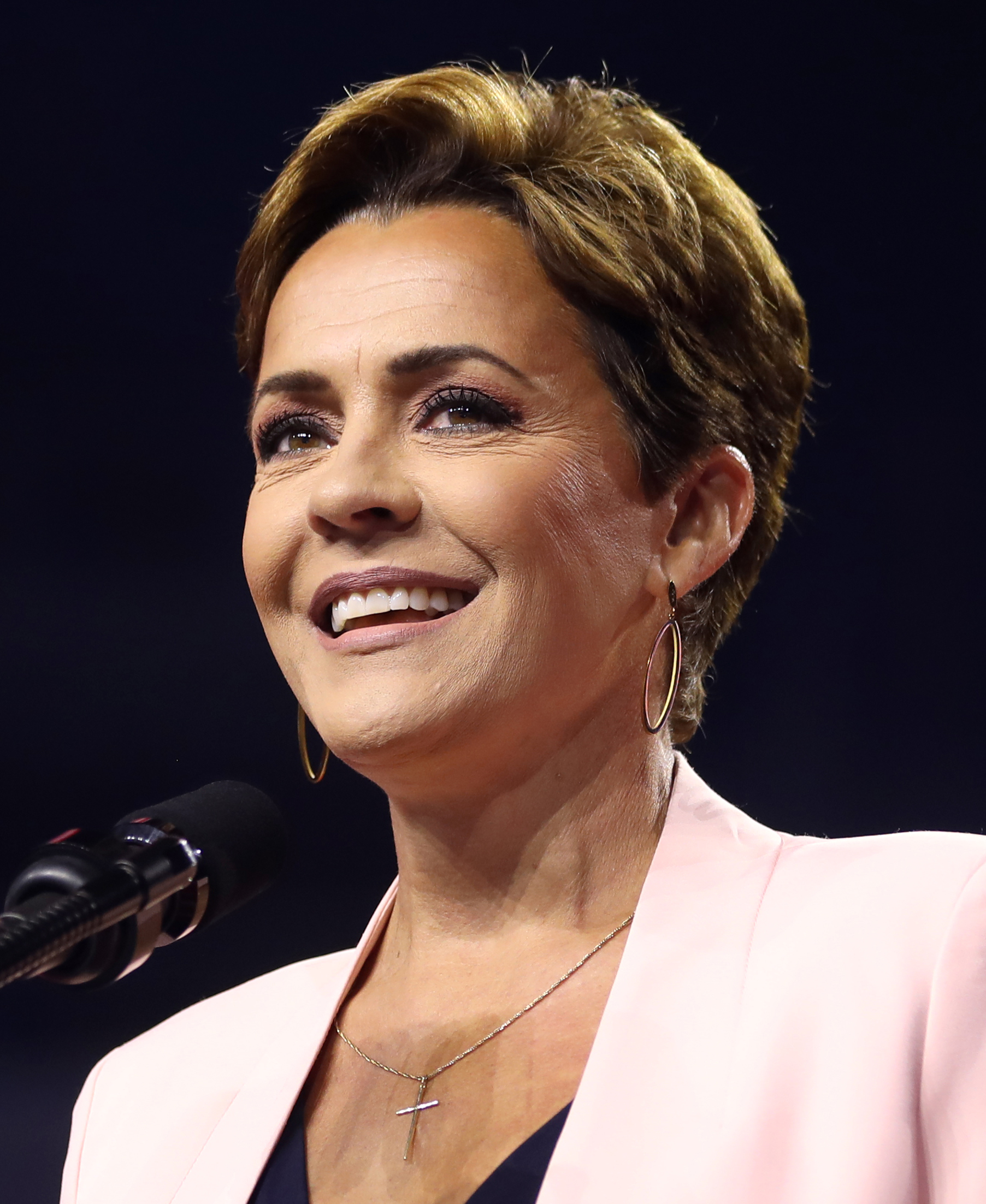
Nominee	Ruben Gallego	Kari Lake
Party	Democratic	Republican
Popular vote	1,676,335	1,595,761
Percentage	50.06%	47.65%
- Gallego: 40–50% 50–60% 60–70% 70–80% 80–90% >90% Lake: 40–50% 50–60% 60–70% 70–80% 80–90% >90% Tie: 40–50% 50% No votes
U.S. senator before election
Kyrsten Sinema
Independent
Elected U.S. senator
Ruben Gallego
Democratic

The 2024 United States Senate election in Arizona was held on November 5, 2024, to elect a member of the United States Senate to represent the state of Arizona. Democratic Congressman Ruben Gallego won his first term in office, defeating Republican former news anchor Kari Lake. He succeeded independent incumbent Kyrsten Sinema, who did not seek a second term.

Sinema, who was elected as a Democrat, was considered vulnerable to a primary challenge due to frequently opposing her party's legislative agenda. After preparing a re-election bid as an independent, Sinema announced she would retire from the Senate. Gallego ran unopposed in the Democratic primary. Lake, the Republican nominee in the 2022 Arizona gubernatorial election, won her party's nomination with 55% of the vote against Pinal County sheriff Mark Lamb. The election was considered among the most competitive Senate races in 2024. Most polls and ratings had Gallego as the favorite to win. Gallego defeated Lake by 2.41 percentage points, a closer race than polls had projected for most of the campaign. Republican presidential candidate Donald Trump's wider-than-expected victory in the state likely contributed to this, but there was also a significant amount of ticket splitting between the presidential and senatorial races.

Gallego outperformed Kamala Harris by the fourth-largest margin among Democratic Senate candidates in 2024, and the largest margin for a non-incumbent. Gallego particularly benefitted from ticket splitting among Hispanics, who according to exit polls gave Gallego 60% of their votes, compared to 54% for Harris. Specifically, Gallego received 93,475 more votes than Harris, while Lake received 174,481 fewer votes than Donald Trump. This election marked the fourth consecutive election cycle in which Democrats won a Senate election in Arizona.

This was the first time that Arizona voted for candidates of different political parties for U.S. senator and president since Democrat Dennis DeConcini was reelected as Republican George H. W. Bush carried the state in 1988. Gallego also became the first Latino elected to the Senate from Arizona, a state with a large Latino population. This was the first time since 2006 that any candidate won a majority of the vote in this seat. Republicans have not won a Senate race in Arizona since 2016.

Similarly to the 2022 Arizona gubernatorial election, Lake refused to concede defeat.

== Background ==
Arizona was once considered a Republican stronghold, but has become a critical swing state. Both parties have seen success in the state in recent years. As of May 2024, Democrats control the governorship, most other statewide offices, and both U.S. Senate seats, while Republicans control both houses of the Arizona State Legislature and a 6–3 majority of Arizona's U.S. House delegation. Republican presidential candidate Donald Trump won Arizona by 3.5% in 2016, while Democratic presidential candidate Joe Biden prevailed by 0.3% in 2020.

== Democratic primary ==
Prior to her departure from the Democratic Party, Sinema was considered highly vulnerable to a primary challenge due to her opposition to several parts of the Democratic Party's legislative agenda. Prospective polling showed Sinema trailing all of her potential challengers by wide margins, with U.S. Representative Ruben Gallego being viewed by numerous political analysts as the frontrunner to challenge her. On January 22, 2022, the Arizona Democratic Party voted overwhelmingly to censure Sinema for a second time for voting against a carve-out to the Senate filibuster rule in a Democratic-led effort to pass the John Lewis Voting Rights Act. Sinema did not support the Inflation Reduction Act until after Democratic leaders agreed to remove a provision closing the so-called carried interest tax loophole, the closure of which would have raised taxes on hedge fund owners and investment managers. This action renewed calls from Democrats for Sinema to face a primary opponent in her next election.

Sinema left the Democratic Party in December 2022 and registered as an independent, while continuing to be counted as part of the Senate Democratic Caucus.

=== Candidates ===
==== Nominee ====
- Ruben Gallego, U.S. representative for Arizona's 3rd congressional district (2015–2025)

==== Declined ====
- Kate Gallego, mayor of Phoenix (2019–present) (endorsed Ruben Gallego, her ex-husband)
- Greg Stanton, U.S. representative for Arizona's 4th congressional district (2019–present) and former mayor of Phoenix (2012–2018) (ran for re-election)

=== Endorsements ===
Ruben Gallego

Federal officials

- Hillary Clinton, former U.S. secretary of state (2009–2013)

U.S. senators

- Dennis DeConcini, Arizona (1977–1995)
- Mark Kelly, Arizona (2020–present)
- Chuck Schumer, New York (1999–present)

U.S. representatives

- Ron Barber, AZ-02 (2012–2015)
- Gabby Giffords, AZ-08 (2007–2012)
- Dan Goldman, NY-10 (2023–present)
- Raúl Grijalva, AZ-07 (2003–2025)
- Ann Kirkpatrick, AZ-02 (2009–2011, 2013–2017, 2019–2023)
- Seth Moulton, MA-06 (2015–present)
- Nancy Pelosi, CA-11 (1987–present) and former speaker of the House (2007–2011, 2019–2023)
- Linda Sánchez, CA-38 (2013–present)

Statewide officials

- Katie Hobbs, governor of Arizona (2023–present)
- Anna Tovar, Arizona Corporation commissioner (2021–2025)

State legislators

- Flavio Bravo, state senator from the 26th district (2015–2019, 2023–present)
- Eva Diaz, state senator from the 22nd district (2023–present)
- Mitzi Epstein, Arizona Senate minority leader (2023–2025) from the 12th district (2023–present)
- Theresa Hatathlie, state senator from the 6th district (2023–present)
- Catherine Miranda, state senator from the 11th district (2015–2019, 2023–present)
- 7 state representatives

Local officials

- Yassamin Ansari, Phoenix city councilor (2021–2024)
- Kate Gallego, mayor of Phoenix (2019–present) (candidate's ex-wife)
- Regina Romero, mayor of Tucson (2019–present)
- Corey Woods, mayor of Tempe (2020–present)

Individuals

- Harry Dunn, former U.S. Capitol Police officer
- Mark Hamill, actor
- Dolores Huerta, labor leader

Political parties

- Arizona Democratic Party

Labor unions

- Alliance for Retired Americans
- Arizona AFL-CIO
- Association of Flight Attendants
- Communications Workers of America Arizona State Council
- International Brotherhood of Teamsters Local 104
- National Education Association
- United Farm Workers
- United Mine Workers of America

Organizations

- Brady PAC
- CHC BOLD PAC
- Climate Hawks Vote
- Council for a Livable World
- Democratic Senate Campaign Committee
- End Citizens United
- Fairshake
- Feminist Majority PAC
- Giffords
- Human Rights Campaign
- Indivisible
- Jewish Democratic Council of America
- Latino Victory Fund
- League of Conservation Voters
- People for the American Way
- Planned Parenthood Action Fund
- Population Connection Action Fund
- Progressive Change Campaign Committee
- Reproductive Freedom for All
- Sierra Club
- Stonewall Democrats of Arizona
- Swing Left
- UnidosUS
- VoteVets

Tribes

- Salt River Pima–Maricopa Indian Community
- San Carlos Apache Tribe

=== Polling ===
Hypothetical polling

Ruben Gallego vs. Alexander Keller

Poll source	Date(s) administered	Sample size (Note: Key: A – all adults RV – registered voters LV – likely voters V – unclear)	Margin of error	Ruben Gallego	Alexander Keller	Other	Undecided
Emerson College	August 2–4, 2023	571 (LV)	–	48%	6%	6% (Note: "Someone else" with 6%)	40%

Ruben Gallego vs. Kate Gallego vs. Kathy Hoffman vs. Regina Romero vs. Kyrsten Sinema vs. Greg Stanton

Poll source	Date(s) administered	Sample size	Margin of error	Kate Gallego	Ruben Gallego	Kathy Hoffman	Regina Romero	Kyrsten Sinema	Greg Stanton	Undecided
Data for Progress (D)	January 21–24, 2022	673 (LV)	± 4.0%	–	74%	–	–	16%	–	10%
Data for Progress (D)	January 21–24, 2022	673 (LV)	± 4.0%	–	66%	–	–	17%	–	17%
Noble Predictive Insights	November 1–8, 2021	229 (RV)	± 6.5%	–	47%	–	–	24%	–	29%
Noble Predictive Insights	November 1–8, 2021	229 (RV)	± 6.5%	–	–	44%	–	24%	–	32%
Noble Predictive Insights	November 1–8, 2021	229 (RV)	± 6.5%	–	–	–	–	25%	47%	28%
Data for Progress (D) (Note: This poll was sponsored by Primary Sinema)	October 8–10, 2021	467 (LV)	± 5.0%	9%	23%	–	9%	19%	13%	26%
Data for Progress (D)	October 8–10, 2021	467 (LV)	± 5.0%	60%	–	–	–	25%	–	15%
Data for Progress (D)	October 8–10, 2021	467 (LV)	± 5.0%	–	62%	–	–	23%	–	15%
Data for Progress (D)	October 8–10, 2021	467 (LV)	± 5.0%	–	–	–	55%	26%	–	19%
Data for Progress (D)	October 8–10, 2021	467 (LV)	± 5.0%	–	–	–	–	24%	59%	17%

=== Results ===
Democratic primary results
Party	Candidate	Votes	%
Democratic	Ruben Gallego	498,927	100.0%
Total votes		498,927	100.0%

== Republican primary ==
=== Candidates ===
==== Nominee ====
- Kari Lake, former KSAZ-TV news anchor and nominee for governor of Arizona in 2022

==== Eliminated in primary ====
- Mark Lamb, Pinal County sheriff (2017–2024)
- Elizabeth Jean Reye, neuroscientist

==== Declined ====
- Juan Ciscomani, U.S. representative for Arizona's 6th congressional district (2023–present)
- Doug Ducey, governor of Arizona (2015–2023)
- Abraham Hamadeh, former prosecutor in the Maricopa County attorney's office and nominee for Arizona attorney general in 2022 (ran for U.S. House, endorsed Lake)
- Blake Masters, venture capitalist and nominee for U.S. Senate in 2022 (ran for U.S. House, endorsed Lake)
- Karrin Taylor Robson, former member of the Arizona Board of Regents (2017–2021) and candidate for governor of Arizona in 2022 (endorsed Lake)
- Kelli Ward, former state senator from the 5th district (2013–2015), former chair of the Arizona Republican Party (2019–2023), and candidate for U.S. Senate in 2016 and 2018

=== Endorsements ===
Kari Lake

U.S. presidents

- Donald Trump, 45th president of the United States (2017–2021)

U.S. senators

- John Barrasso, Wyoming (2007–present)
- Marsha Blackburn, Tennessee (2019–present)
- Ted Budd, North Carolina (2023–present)
- John Cornyn, Texas (2002–present)
- Tom Cotton, Arkansas (2015–present)
- Kevin Cramer, North Dakota (2019–present)
- Ted Cruz, Texas (2013–present)
- Steve Daines, Montana (2015–present)
- Joni Ernst, Iowa (2015–present)
- Chuck Grassley, Iowa (1981–present)
- Bill Hagerty, Tennessee (2021–present)
- Mike Lee, Utah (2011–present)
- Cynthia Lummis, Wyoming (2021–present)
- Roger Marshall, Kansas (2021–present)
- Markwayne Mullin, Oklahoma (2023–present)
- Rand Paul, Kentucky (2011–present)
- Jim Risch, Idaho (2009–present)
- Eric Schmitt, Missouri (2023–present)
- Tim Scott, South Carolina (2013–present)
- John Thune, South Dakota, (2005–present)
- Tommy Tuberville, Alabama (2021–present)
- JD Vance, Ohio (2023–2025)
- Roger Wicker, Mississippi (2007–present)

U.S. representatives

- Jim Banks, IN-03 (2017–2025)
- Byron Donalds, FL-19 (2021–present)
- Matt Gaetz, FL-01 (2017–2024)
- Louie Gohmert, TX-01 (2005–2023)
- Wesley Hunt, TX-38 (2023–present)
- Ronny Jackson, TX-13 (2021–present)
- Brian Mast, FL-21 (2017–present)
- Cory Mills, FL-07 (2023–present)
- Burgess Owens, UT-04 (2021–present)
- Elise Stefanik, NY-21 (2015–present)

Statewide officials

- Doug Burgum, governor of North Dakota (2016–2024)
- Ken Paxton, Texas attorney general (2015–present)

State officials

- Karrin Taylor Robson, former member of the Arizona Board of Regents (2017–2021)

State senators

- Dave Farnsworth, state senator from SD-10 (2023–present)
- Jake Hoffman, SD-15 (2023–present)
- Warren Petersen, president of the Arizona Senate (2023–present) from SD-14 (2021–present)
- Wendy Rogers, state senator from SD-7 (2021–present)

State representatives

- Alexander Kolodin, SD-03 (2023–present)

Organizations

- Citizens United PVF
- College Republicans of America
- National Republican Senatorial Committee
- Republicans for National Renewal
- Republican National Hispanic Assembly
- Senate Conservatives Fund
- Turning Point Action

Individuals

- David Bossie, president of Citizens United
- Blake Masters, venture capitalist
- Chad Prather, comedian
- Vivek Ramaswamy, pharmaceutical executive and candidate for president in 2024
Mark Lamb

Organizations

- Latinos for America First

=== Fundraising ===
Campaign finance reports as of July 10, 2024
Candidate	Raised	Spent	Cash on hand
Kari Lake	$10,352,741	$8,290,053	$2,062,687
Mark Lamb	$2,059,130	$1,795,730	$263,400
Source: Federal Election Commission

=== Polling ===
Poll source	Date(s) administered	Sample size	Margin of error	Kari Lake	Mark Lamb	Other	Undecided
Noble Predictive Insights	July 22–23, 2024	438 (LV)	± 4.7%	49%	38%	7% (Note: Elizabeth Jean Reye with 3%)	2%
Noble Predictive Insights	May 7–14, 2024	364 (RV)	± 5.1%	46%	21%	9%	25%
Rasmussen Reports (R) (Note: Poll sponsored by the Bull Moose Project.)	February 21–26, 2024	469 (LV)	± 3.0%	55%	26%	7%	12%
Noble Predictive Insights	February 6–13, 2024	384 (RV)	± 5.0%	54%	21%	9% (Note: Brian Wright with 6%; George Nicholson with 2%; "Someone else" with 1%)	17%

Hypothetical polling

Poll source	Date(s) administered	Sample size	Margin of error	Abe Hamadeh	Kari Lake	Mark Lamb	Jim Lamon	Blake Masters	Karrin Taylor Robson	Brian Wright	Other	Undecided
Noble Predictive Insights	October 25–31, 2023	1,010 (RV)	± 3.1%	–	40%	14%	–	10%	–	4%	–	33%
Emerson College	August 2–4, 2023	667 (LV)	± 3.7%	–	42%	11%	2%	7%	–	2%	–	28%
J.L. Partners	April 10–12, 2023	550 (LV)	± 4.2%	4%	38%	8%	3%	7%	10%	–	2%	29%

=== Results ===
Results by county: Lake: 50–60%; 60–70%; Lamb: 50–60%; 60–70%

Republican primary results
Party	Candidate	Votes	%
Republican	Kari Lake	409,339	55.28%
Republican	Mark Lamb	292,888	39.56%
Republican	Elizabeth Jean Reye	38,208	5.16%
Total votes		740,435	100.0%

== Green primary ==
The Arizona Green Party endorsed the write-in campaign of Quintana and was "actively opposed" to Hernandez and Norton's campaigns. A press release on the national Green Party's website stated that party leaders alleged that Norton was a plant for the Democratic Party, and that Hernandez was a plant for the Republican Party.

=== Candidates ===
==== Nominee ====
- Eduardo Heredia Quintana (write-in), chair of the Pima County Green Party

==== Eliminated in primary ====
- Arturo Hernandez
- Mike Norton, nonprofit executive

=== Endorsements ===
Eduardo Heredia Quintana

Political parties

- Arizona Green Party

=== Fundraising ===
Campaign finance reports as of June 30, 2024
Candidate	Raised	Spent	Cash on hand
Mike Norton	$84,401	$76,692	$7,708
Source: Federal Election Commission

=== Results ===
Green primary results
Party	Candidate	Votes	%
Green	Eduardo Heredia Quintana (write-in)	282	49.47%
Green	Mike Norton	180	31.58%
Green	Arturo Hernandez	108	18.95%
Total votes		570	100.0%

== Independents ==
=== Candidates ===
==== Declined ====
- Kyrsten Sinema, incumbent U.S. senator (2019–2025)

=== Endorsements ===
Kyrsten Sinema (declined)

U.S. senators

- Lisa Murkowski, Alaska (2002–present) (Republican)

Individuals

- Meghan McCain, television personality and daughter of former U.S. Senator John McCain (Republican)

Organizations

- AIPAC

=== Fundraising ===
Italics indicate a declined candidate

Campaign finance reports as of March 31, 2024
Candidate	Raised	Spent	Cash on hand
Kyrsten Sinema (I)	$17,047,387	$7,065,565	$10,153,343
Source: Federal Election Commission

== General election ==
=== Predictions ===
Source	Ranking	As of
Elections Daily	Likely D (flip)	October 9, 2024
CNalysis	Likely D (flip)	October 15, 2024
RealClearPolitics	Lean D (flip)	October 3, 2024
Sabato's Crystal Ball	Lean D (flip)	September 6, 2024
Inside Elections	Lean D (flip)	October 10, 2024
The Cook Political Report	Lean D (flip)	September 12, 2024
Decision Desk HQ/The Hill	Lean D (flip)	September 20, 2024
Split Ticket	Lean D (flip)	October 23, 2024
538	Likely D (flip)	October 23, 2024

=== Campaign strategy ===
Gallego's campaign emphasized his military service record, highlighting his deployment to Iraq as a Marine Corps infantryman. His campaign positioned his military credentials as evidence of his ability to work across party lines and appeal to independent voters. Lake's campaign focused on her alignment with Trump, and emphasized border security and election integrity issues.

=== Post-primary endorsements ===
Ruben Gallego (D)

Executive branch officials

- Kamala Harris, vice president of the United States (2021–2025)

Statewide officials

- Tim Walz, governor of Minnesota (2019–present)
- Gretchen Whitmer, governor of Michigan (2019–present)

State legislators

- Adrian Boafo, Maryland state delegate from the 23rd district (2023–present)
- Robin Shaw, former state representative (1994–1998) (Republican)

Mayors

- John Giles, Mesa (2014–2025) (Republican)
- Neil Giuliano, Tempe (1994–2004)

Organizations

- Arizona Police Association
- Democratic Majority for Israel
- Everytown for Gun Safety Action Fund
- League of United Latin American Citizens Adelante PAC
- March for Our Lives
Kari Lake (R)

U.S. senators

- Marco Rubio, U.S. senator from Florida (2011–2025)

Governors

- Doug Ducey, former governor of Arizona (2015–2023)

Local officials

- Mark Lamb, sheriff of Pinal County (2017–2024)

Organizations

- Club for Growth PAC

=== Debates ===
2024 Arizona U.S. Senate election debate
No.	Date	Host	Moderators	Link	Democratic	Republican
Key: P Participant A Absent N Not invited I Invited W Withdrawn						
Key: P Participant A Absent N Not invited I Invited W Withdrawn					Gallego	Lake
1	October 10, 2024	Clean Elections	Steve Goldstein; Nohelani Graf		P	P

=== Post-primary fundraising ===
Campaign finance reports as of October 16, 2024
Candidate	Raised	Spent	Cash on hand
Ruben Gallego (D)	$56,843,786	$55,360,823	$2,759,538
Kari Lake (R)	$21,396,539	$18,239,291	$3,157,247
Source: Federal Election Commission

=== Polling ===
Aggregate polls

Source of poll aggregation	Dates administered	Dates updated	Ruben Gallego (D)	Kari Lake (R)	Undecided (Note: Calculated by taking the difference of 100% and all other candidates combined.)	Margin
FiveThirtyEight	through November 4, 2024	November 4, 2024	49.4%	45.3%	5.3%	Gallego +4.1%
RealClearPolitics	October 20 – November 4, 2024	November 4, 2024	48.8%	45.6%	5.4%	Gallego +3.2%
270toWin	October 22 – November 4, 2024	November 4, 2024	49.5%	44.3%	6.2%	Gallego +5.2%
TheHill/DDHQ	through November 4, 2024	November 4, 2024	49.3%	45.8%	4.9%	Gallego +3.5%
Average			49.3%	45.3%	5.4%	Gallego +4.0%

Poll source	Date(s) administered	Sample size	Margin of error	Ruben Gallego (D)	Kari Lake (R)	Other	Undecided
AtlasIntel	November 3–4, 2024	875 (LV)	± 3.0%	48%	48%	2% (Note: "Blank/Null/Won't vote" with 1%; "Other" with 1%)	2%
Victory Insights (R)	November 2–3, 2024	750 (LV)	–	50%	47%	–	3%
The Trafalgar Group (R)	November 1–3, 2024	1,090 (LV)	± 2.9%	49%	49%	–	2%
Patriot Polling (R)	November 1–3, 2024	801 (RV)	± 3.0%	51%	48%	–	–
InsiderAdvantage (R)	November 1–2, 2024	800 (LV)	± 3.0%	49%	47%	1%	3%
AtlasIntel	November 1–2, 2024	967 (LV)	± 3.0%	47%	49%	2%	2%
Emerson College (Note: Poll sponsored by The Hill)	October 30 – November 2, 2024	900 (LV)	± 3.2%	50%	45%	–	5%
New York Times/Siena College	October 25 – November 2, 2024	1,025 (LV)	± 3.4%	50%	45%	–	4%
New York Times/Siena College	October 25 – November 2, 2024	1,025 (RV)	± 3.4%	51%	43%	–	6%
Morning Consult	October 23 – November 1, 2024	666 (LV)	± 4.0%	50%	42%	–	8%
AtlasIntel	October 30–31, 2024	1,005 (LV)	± 3.0%	48%	49%	2%	1%
OnMessage (R)	October 29–31, 2024	800 (LV)	–	48%	48%	–	4%
YouGov (Note: Poll conducted for The Times, Stanford University, Arizona State University, and Yale University)	October 25–31, 2024	856 (LV)	± 4.4%	49%	45%	–	6%
YouGov	October 25–31, 2024	880 (RV)	± 4.4%	49%	44%	–	7%
ActiVote	October 5–31, 2024	400 (LV)	± 4.9%	54%	46%	–	–
Noble Predictive Insights	October 28–30, 2024	775 (LV)	± 3.5%	48%	44%	4% (Note: Quintana (G) with 2%; "Refused" with 2%)	3%
Data for Progress (D)	October 25–30, 2024	1,079 (LV)	± 3.0%	50%	45%	2% (Note: Quintana (G) with 2%)	4%
Rasmussen Reports (R) (Note: Poll sponsored by American Thinker)	October 25–29, 2024	803 (LV)	± 3.0%	48%	44%	4% (Note: "Other" with 4%)	4%
AtlasIntel	October 25–29, 2024	1,458 (LV)	± 3.0%	48%	48%	2%	2%
Mitchell Research & Communications	October 28, 2024	610 (LV)	± 4.0%	50%	46%	3% (Note: Quintana (G) with 1%)	5%
Mitchell Research & Communications	October 28, 2024	610 (LV)	± 4.0%	50%	47%	–	3%
Data Orbital (R)	October 26–28, 2024	550 (LV)	± 4.3%	45%	45%	5% (Note: Quintana (G) with 2%; "Refused" with 2%; "I did not vote on US Senate" with 1%)	6%
RABA Research	October 25–27, 2024	589 (RV)	± 4.0%	49%	34%	8% (Note: "Someone else" with 8%)	9%
The Trafalgar Group (R)	October 24–26, 2024	1,094 (LV)	± 2.9%	50%	46%	–	4%
CNN/SRSS	October 21–26, 2024	781 (LV)	± 4.4%	51%	43%	6% (Note: "Other" with 5%; "Neither" with 1%)	1%
Marist College	October 17–22, 2024	1,193 (LV)	± 3.7%	53%	45%	–	2%
Marist College	October 17–22, 2024	1,329 (RV)	± 3.5%	53%	45%	–	1%
HighGround Public Affairs	October 19–20, 2024	400 (LV)	± 4.9%	52%	42%	2% (Note: "Some other candidate" with 2%)	4%
InsiderAdvantage (R)	October 19–20, 2024	800 (LV)	± 3.0%	50%	46%	1% (Note: "Another candidate" with 1%)	3%
University of Arizona/Truedot	October 12–20, 2024	846 (RV)	± 3.4%	51%	36%	2% (Note: "Someone Else" with 2%)	11%
Redfield & Wilton Strategies (Note: Poll sponsored by The Daily Telegraph)	October 16–18, 2024	691 (LV)	± 3.5%	48%	41%	5% (Note: Quintana (G) with 2%; "Won't vote if these are the candidates" with 2%; "Other" with 1%)	7%
AtlasIntel	October 12–17, 2024	1,440 (LV)	± 3.0%	50%	46%	2%	2%
CBS News/YouGov	October 11–16, 2024	1,403 (LV)	± 3.3%	54%	45%	1% (Note: "Someone else" with 1%)	–
Morning Consult	October 6–15, 2024	653 (LV)	± 3.0%	52%	40%	3%	5%
Redfield & Wilton Strategies	October 12–14, 2024	1,141 (LV)	± 2.7%	47%	42%	4% (Note: "Won't vote if these are the candidates" with 2%, Quintana (G) with 1%; "Other" with 1%)	7%
The Trafalgar Group (R)	October 10–13, 2024	1,090 (LV)	± 2.9%	48%	44%	3% (Note: "Other" with 3%)	6%
New York Times/Siena College	October 7–10, 2024	808 (LV)	± 3.8%	48%	41%	–	10%
New York Times/Siena College	October 7–10, 2024	808 (RV)	± 3.8%	48%	39%	–	12%
ActiVote	September 8 – October 10, 2024	400 (LV)	± 4.9%	53%	47%	–	–
Emerson College	October 5–8, 2024	1,000 (LV)	± 3.0%	50%	43%	–	7%
RMG Research (Note: Poll sponsored by the Napolitan Institute)	September 30 – October 2, 2024	783 (LV)	± 3.5%	50%	41%	4% (Note: "Someone else" with 3%; "Would not vote" with 1%)	5%
RMG Research	September 30 – October 2, 2024	783 (LV)	± 3.5%	52% (Note: With voters who lean towards a given candidate)	42%	1%	5%
Redfield & Wilton Strategies	September 27 – October 2, 2024	555 (LV)	± 3.9%	48%	42%	3% (Note: "Won't vote if these are the candidates" with 2%, Quintana (G) with 1%)	7%
Fabrizio Ward (R)/ Impact Research (D) (Note: Poll commissioned by AARP)	September 24 – October 1, 2024	600 (LV)	± 4.0%	51%	44%	1% (Note: "Other" with 1%)	4%
InsiderAdvantage (R)	September 29–30, 2024	800 (LV)	± 3.0%	50%	43%	1%	6%
HighGround Public Affairs (Note: Poll sponsored by Arizona's Family)	September 26–29, 2024	500 (LV)	± 4.4%	51%	41%	2%	5%
National Research Inc. (Note: Poll sponsored by Democracy Defense Project)	September 25–29, 2024	600 (LV)	± 4.0%	48%	42%	2%	8%
Emerson College (Note: Poll sponsored by RealClearWorld)	September 27–28, 2024	920 (LV)	± 3.2%	52%	41%	–	7%
AtlasIntel	September 20–25, 2024	946 (LV)	± 3.0%	50%	46%	2%	2%
BSG (R)/GS Strategy Group (D) (Note: Poll sponsored by The Cook Political Report)	September 19–25, 2024	409 (LV)	–	51%	39%	4%	6%
BSG (R)/GS Strategy Group (D)	September 19–25, 2024	409 (LV)	–	54%	41%	–	5%
Fox News	September 20–24, 2024	764 (LV)	± 3.5%	55%	42%	1% (Note: "Wouldn't vote" with 1%)	1%
Fox News	September 20–24, 2024	1,021 (RV)	± 3.0%	56%	42%	1%	1%
Suffolk University (Note: Poll sponsored by USA Today)	September 19–24, 2024	500 (LV)	± 4.4%	47%	41%	5% (Note: Quintana (G) with 3%; "Refused" with 2%)	8%
Marist College	September 19–24, 2024	1,264 (LV)	± 3.8%	54%	44%	–	1%
Marist College	September 19–24, 2024	1,416 (RV)	± 3.6%	53%	44%	–	2%
Rasmussen Reports (R)	September 19–22, 2024	1,030 (LV)	± 3.0%	47%	45%	4%	4%
New York Times/Siena College	September 17–21, 2024	713 (LV)	± 4.1%	49%	43%	–	8%
New York Times/Siena College	September 17–21, 2024	713 (RV)	± 4.1%	50%	41%	–	9%
Redfield & Wilton Strategies	September 16–19, 2024	789 (LV)	± 3.2%	46%	41%	3%	9%
Emerson College	September 15–18, 2024	868 (LV)	± 3.3%	48%	42%	–	10%
Morning Consult	September 9–18, 2024	862 (LV)	± 3.0%	53%	39%	–	8%
The Trafalgar Group (R)	September 11–12, 2024	1,088 (LV)	± 2.9%	47%	43%	4%	5%
Redfield & Wilton Strategies	September 6–9, 2024	765 (LV)	± 3.3%	48%	42%	2% (Note: "Other" and Quintana (G) with 1%)	8%
Morning Consult	August 30 – September 8, 2024	901 (LV)	± 3.0%	49%	41%	3%	7%
YouGov	August 23 – September 3, 2024	900 (RV)	± 4.2%	50%	42%	–	9%
InsiderAdvantage (R)	August 29–31, 2024	800 (LV)	± 3.0%	49%	45%	2% (Note: "Another candidate" with 2%)	4%
University of Arizona/Truedot	August 28–31, 2024	1,155 (RV)	–	47%	36%	4% (Note: "Someone Else" with 4%)	13%
CNN/SRSS	August 23–29, 2024	682 (LV)	± 4.7%	47%	44%	8% (Note: "Other" with 6%; "Neither" with 2%)	–
Redfield & Wilton Strategies	August 25–28, 2024	530 (LV)	± 4.0%	42%	37%	3% (Note: Quintana (G) with 2%; "Other (Another Third Party/Write-In)" with 1%)	17%
Emerson College	August 25–28, 2024	720 (LV)	± 3.6%	49%	42%	–	9%
Fox News	August 23–26, 2024	1,014 (RV)	± 3.0%	56%	41%	2% (Note: "Other" with 1%; "Wouldn't vote" with 1%)	1%
Noble Predictive Insights	August 12–16, 2024	1,003 (RV)	± 3.1%	47%	40%	–	13%
Redfield & Wilton Strategies	August 12–15, 2024	592 (LV)	± 3.7%	44%	39%	4% (Note: "Other (Another Third Party/Write-In)" with 3%; "Won't vote if these are the candidates" with 1%)	13%
New York Times/Siena College	August 8–15, 2024	677 (RV)	± 4.1%	49%	41%	–	10%
New York Times/Siena College	August 8–15, 2024	677 (LV)	± 4.4%	51%	42%	–	8%
WPA Intelligence (R) (Note: Poll sponsored by Club for Growth, which has endorsed Lake.)	August 11–13, 2024	600 (LV)	± 4.0%	48%	46%	3% (Note: Norton (G) with 3%)	3%
Peak Insights (R) (Note: Poll sponsored by the National Republican Senatorial Committee, which supports Lake's campaign.)	July 31 – August 5, 2024	800 (LV)	± 3.0%	46%	46%	–	8%
HighGround Public Affairs	July 30 – August 5, 2024	500 (LV)	± 4.4%	50%	39%	3% (Note: "Some other candidate" with 3%)	9%
Redfield & Wilton Strategies	July 31 – August 3, 2024	567 (LV)	± 3.8%	42%	36%	–	22%
BSG (R)/GS Strategy Group (D)	July 26 – August 2, 2024	435 (LV)	–	51%	42%	–	7%
	July 30, 2024	Primary elections held					
Emerson College (Note: Poll sponsored by The Hill and Nexstar)	July 22–23, 2024	800 (RV)	± 3.4%	46%	42%	–	12%
	July 21, 2024	Joe Biden withdraws from the presidential race					
Public Policy Polling (D) (Note: Poll sponsored by the Clean & Prosperous America PAC.)	July 19–20, 2024	736 (RV)	–	49%	42%	–	9%
Rasmussen Reports (R) (Note: Poll sponsored by The Heartland Institute)	July 5–12, 2024	1,101 (LV)	± 3.0%	44%	41%	7% (Note: "Other" with 7%)	8%
Public Policy Polling (D) (Note: Poll sponsored by the Progress Action Fund, which is a sponsor of the Democratic Party.)	July 10–11, 2024	596 (RV)	–	50%	47%	–	4%
J.L. Partners (R) (Note: Poll sponsored by Lake's campaign.)	July 10–11, 2024	513 (LV)	± 4.3%	43%	44%	–	3%
YouGov	July 4–12, 2024	900 (RV)	± 3.9%	48%	41%	2%	9%
YouGov	July 4–12, 2024	793 (LV)	–	49%	42%	2%	8%
Expedition Strategies (Note: Poll Sponsored by Progressive Policy Institute)	June 24 – July 8, 2024	268 (LV)	–	49%	45%	–	7%
Remington Research Group (R) (Note: Poll sponsored by American Fuel & Petrochemical Manufacturers, a group that supports Republicans.)	June 29 – July 1, 2024	638 (LV)	–	47%	47%	–	6%
North Star Opinion Research (R) (Note: Poll sponsored by American Greatness)	June 17–20, 2024	600 (LV)	± 4.0%	39%	38%	9% (Note: Quintana (G) with 9%)	13%
Emerson College	June 13–18, 2024	1,000 (RV)	± 3.0%	45%	41%	–	14%
Rasmussen Reports (R)	June 11–13, 2024	750 (RV)	± 4.0%	44%	41%	5% (Note: "Other" with 5%)	10%
Rasmussen Reports (R)	June 11–13, 2024	750 (RV)	± 4.0%	40%	39%	7% (Note: Hernandez (G) with 4%; "Other" with 3%)	14%
Fabrizio Ward (R)/ Impact Research (D)	May 28 – June 4, 2024	600 (LV)	± 4.0%	48%	45%	–	7%
Mainstreet Research/FAU	May 19–21, 2024	609 (RV)	± 4.0%	44%	38%	–	18%
Mainstreet Research/FAU	May 19–21, 2024	501 (LV)	± 4.0%	48%	39%	–	13%
CBS News/YouGov	May 10–16, 2024	1,214 (RV)	± 3.5%	49%	36%	–	15%
Noble Predictive Insights	May 7–14, 2024	1,003 (RV)	± 3.1%	46%	36%	–	18%
BSG (R)/GS Strategy Group (D)	May 6–13, 2024	527 (LV)	± 4.3%	46%	41%	–	13%
New York Times/Siena College	April 28 – May 9, 2024	626 (RV)	± 4.0%	45%	41%	–	14%
New York Times/Siena College	April 28 – May 9, 2024	626 (LV)	± 4.0%	46%	43%	–	11%
Data Orbital (R)	April 27–29, 2024	550 (LV)	± 4.3%	48%	44%	–	8%
Emerson College	April 25–29, 2024	1,000 (RV)	± 3.0%	45%	43%	–	12%
RABA Research	March 28–31, 2024	503 (RV)	± 4.4%	36%	28%	13% (Note: "Someone else" with 13%)	23%
Emerson College	March 12–15, 2024	1,000 (RV)	± 3.0%	44%	40%	–	16%
	March 5, 2024	Kyrsten Sinema announces she will not seek re-election.					
Rasmussen Reports (R)	February 21–26, 2024	1,000 (LV)	± 3.0%	42%	45%	4% (Note: "Wouldn't vote" with 4%)	9%
Emerson College	February 16–19, 2024	1,000 (RV)	± 3.0%	46%	39%	–	15%
Noble Predictive Insights	February 6–13, 2024	1,002 (RV)	± 3.1%	47%	37%	–	16%
J.L. Partners (R)	January 29 – February 1, 2024	500 (RV)	–	44%	46%	–	10%
Public Policy Polling (D) (Note: Poll sponsored by Replace Sinema PAC.)	January 5–6, 2024	590 (V)	± 4.0%	45%	46%	–	9%
Cygnal (R)	October 24–25, 2023	600 (LV)	± 4.0%	46%	43%	–	11%
McLaughlin & Associates (R) (Note: Poll sponsored by NRSC.)	October 24, 2023	–	± 4.4%	49%	44%	–	7%
National Research Inc. (R)	October 8–9, 2023	400 (LV)	± 4.9%	44%	44%	–	12%
Public Policy Polling (D) (Note: Poll sponsored by Gallego's campaign)	October 6–7, 2023	522 (V)	± 4.3%	48%	43%	–	9%
Noble Predictive Insights	July 13–17, 2023	1000 (RV)	± 3.1%	45%	35%	–	20%
Noble Predictive Insights	January 31 – February 9, 2023	1,000 (RV)	± 3.1%	43%	33%	–	24%
Normington Petts (D) (Note: This poll was sponsored by Progress Arizona, LUCHA, and Replace Sinema PAC)	January 18–23, 2023	800 (LV)	± 3.5%	50%	45%	–	5%
Public Policy Polling (D)	December 21, 2022	650 (V)	± 3.8%	48%	47%	–	5%

Hypothetical polling

Ruben Gallego vs. Kari Lake vs. Kyrsten Sinema

Poll source	Date(s) administered	Sample size	Margin of error	Ruben Gallego (D)	Kari Lake (R)	Kyrsten Sinema (I)	Other	Undecided
Rasmussen Reports (R)	February 21–26, 2024	1,000 (LV)	± 3.0%	33%	37%	21%	2% (Note: "Wouldn't vote" with 2%)	7%
Emerson College	February 16–19, 2024	1,000 (RV)	± 3.0%	36%	30%	21%	–	13%
Noble Predictive Insights	February 6–13, 2024	1,002 (RV)	± 3.1%	34%	31%	23%	–	12%
J.L. Partners (R)	January 29 – February 1, 2024	500 (RV)	–	39%	40%	13%	–	8%
Public Policy Polling (D)	January 5–6, 2024	590 (V)	± 4.0%	36%	35%	17%	–	12%
VCreek/AMG (R) (Note: Poll sponsored by Americas PAC, which supports Republican candidates.)	December 1–8, 2023	694 (LV)	± 3.7%	35%	41%	16%	1%	7%
Tulchin Research (D) (Note: Poll conducted for Stand for Children, a non-profit education advocacy group.)	November 13–20, 2023	800 (LV)	± 3.5%	39%	34%	17%	6% (Note: "Someone else" with 6%)	4%
Noble Predictive Insights	October 25–31, 2023	1,010 (RV)	± 3.1%	39%	33%	29%	–	–
Cygnal (R)	October 24–25, 2023	600 (LV)	± 4.0%	36%	37%	15%	–	11%
McLaughlin & Associates (R)	October 24, 2023	–	± 4.4%	41%	37%	17%	–	5%
National Research Inc. (R)	October 8–9, 2023	400 (LV)	± 4.9%	33%	37%	19%	–	10%
Public Policy Polling (D)	October 6–7, 2023	522 (V)	± 4.3%	41%	36%	15%	–	8%
Noble Predictive Insights	July 13–17, 2023	1000 (RV)	± 3.1%	34%	25%	26%	–	15%
Public Policy Polling (D)	April 18–19, 2023	559 (V)	–	42%	35%	14%	–	9%
Noble Predictive Insights	January 31 – February 9, 2023	1,000 (RV)	± 3.1%	34%	26%	19%	–	21%
Normington Petts (D)	January 18–23, 2023	800 (LV)	± 3.5%	36%	36%	24%	–	–
Blueprint Polling (D)	January 5–8, 2023	618 (V)	± 3.9%	32%	36%	14%	–	19%
Public Policy Polling (D)	December 21, 2022	678 (V)	± 3.8%	40%	41%	13%	–	6%

Ruben Gallego vs. Kari Lake vs. "An Independent / third-party candidate"

Poll source	Date(s) administered	Sample size	Margin of error	Ruben Gallego (D)	Kari Lake (R)	Generic independent	Undecided
The Bullfinch Group	March 29 – April 3, 2024	600 (RV)	± 4.0%	41%	41%	10%	8%

Ruben Gallego vs. Doug Ducey vs. Kyrsten Sinema

Poll source	Date(s) administered	Sample size	Margin of error	Ruben Gallego (D)	Doug Ducey (R)	Kyrsten Sinema (I)	Undecided
Noble Predictive Insights	January 31 – February 9, 2023	1,000 (RV)	± 3.1%	38%	34%	–	28%
Noble Predictive Insights	January 31 – February 9, 2023	1,000 (RV)	± 3.1%	32%	27%	17%	23%
Normington Petts (D)	January 18–23, 2023	800 (LV)	± 3.5%	37%	31%	27%	5%

Ruben Gallego vs. Blake Masters vs. Kyrsten Sinema

Poll source	Date(s) administered	Sample size	Margin of error	Ruben Gallego (D)	Blake Masters (R)	Kyrsten Sinema (I)	Undecided
Public Policy Polling (D)	October 6–7, 2023	522 (V)	± 4.3%	41%	31%	17%	11%
Noble Predictive Insights	July 13–17, 2023	1000 (RV)	± 3.1%	44%	36%	–	20%
Noble Predictive Insights	July 13–17, 2023	1000 (RV)	± 3.1%	32%	24%	28%	16%
Noble Predictive Insights	January 31 – February 9, 2023	1,000 (RV)	± 3.1%	43%	32%	–	26%
Noble Predictive Insights	January 31 – February 9, 2023	1,000 (RV)	± 3.1%	33%	24%	22%	21%

Ruben Gallego vs. Karrin Taylor-Robson vs. Kyrsten Sinema

Poll source	Date(s) administered	Sample size	Margin of error	Ruben Gallego (D)	Karrin Taylor Robson (R)	Kyrsten Sinema (I)	Undecided
Noble Predictive Insights	January 31 – February 9, 2023	1,000 (RV)	± 3.1%	36%	32%	–	32%
Noble Predictive Insights	January 31 – February 9, 2023	1,000 (RV)	± 3.1%	31%	24%	21%	25%

Ruben Gallego vs. Mark Lamb vs. Kyrsten Sinema

Poll source	Date(s) administered	Sample size	Margin of error	Ruben Gallego (D)	Mark Lamb (R)	Kyrsten Sinema (I)	Undecided
Noble Predictive Insights	October 25–31, 2023	1,010 (RV)	± 3.1%	36%	32%	32%	0%
Public Policy Polling (D)	October 6–7, 2023	522 (V)	± 4.3%	40%	31%	16%	13%
Emerson College	August 2–4, 2023	1,337 (RV)	± 2.6%	42%	42%	–	16%
Emerson College	August 2–4, 2023	1,337 (RV)	± 2.6%	36%	29%	21%	15%
Noble Predictive Insights	July 13–17, 2023	1000 (RV)	± 3.1%	40%	36%	–	24%
Noble Predictive Insights	July 13–17, 2023	1000 (RV)	± 3.1%	33%	25%	24%	18%
Public Policy Polling (D)	April 18–19, 2023	559 (V)	–	43%	33%	15%	9%

Ruben Gallego vs. Jim Lamon vs. Kyrsten Sinema

Poll source	Date(s) administered	Sample size	Margin of error	Ruben Gallego (D)	Jim Lamon (R)	Kyrsten Sinema (I)	Undecided
Public Policy Polling (D)	April 18–19, 2023	559 (V)	–	43%	27%	16%	14%

Ruben Gallego vs. Brian Wright vs. Kyrsten Sinema

Poll source	Date(s) administered	Sample size	Margin of error	Ruben Gallego (D)	Brian Wright (R)	Kyrsten Sinema (I)	Undecided
Emerson College	August 2–4, 2023	1,337 (RV)	± 2.6%	41%	38%	–	21%
Emerson College	August 2–4, 2023	1,337 (RV)	± 2.6%	37%	25%	26%	12%

=== Results ===
On November 9, 2024, Decision Desk HQ projected that Gallego had won the Senate election in Arizona. On November 12, 2024, the Associated Press projected that Gallego had defeated Lake as well.

2024 United States Senate election in Arizona
Party	Candidate	Votes	%	±%
Democratic	Ruben Gallego	1,676,335	50.06%	+0.10%
Republican	Kari Lake	1,595,761	47.65%	+0.04%
Green	Eduardo Heredia Quintana	75,868	2.27%	–0.14%
Write-in		850	0.03%	–
Total votes		3,348,814	100.0%	N/A
Democratic gain from Independent				

==== By county ====
County	Ruben Gallego Democratic		Kari Lake Republican		Various candidates Other parties		Margin		Total
County	#	%	#	%	#	%	#	%	Total
Apache	19,901	62.46%	11,283	35.41%	679	2.13%	8,618	27.05%	31,863
Cochise	23,347	40.17%	33,184	57.10%	1,585	2.73%	-9,837	-16.93%	58,116
Coconino	42,924	61.77%	24,825	35.73%	1,736	2.50%	18,099	26.05%	69,485
Gila	9,330	34.14%	17,433	63.79%	565	2.07%	-8,103	-29.65%	27,328
Graham	4,235	28.25%	10,385	69.27%	373	2.49%	-6,150	-41.02%	14,993
Greenlee	1,102	33.56%	2,078	63.28%	104	3.17%	-976	-29.72%	3,284
La Paz	2,292	30.52%	4,998	66.56%	219	2.92%	-2,706	-36.04%	7,509
Maricopa	1,045,766	51.50%	940,465	46.31%	44,417	2.19%	105,301	5.19%	2,030,648
Mohave	26,578	24.50%	79,494	73.28%	2,415	2.23%	-52,916	-48.78%	108,487
Navajo	22,173	43.93%	27,218	53.92%	1,085	2.15%	-5,045	-9.99%	50,476
Pima	298,751	59.07%	193,021	38.17%	13,970	2.76%	105,730	20.91%	505,742
Pinal	86,674	41.88%	115,595	55.86%	4,672	2.26%	-28,921	-13.98%	206,941
Santa Cruz	11,986	63.23%	6,370	33.61%	599	3.16%	5,616	29.63%	18,955
Yavapai	52,077	35.22%	93,200	63.03%	2,592	1.75%	-41,123	-27.81%	147,869
Yuma	29,199	43.50%	36,212	53.95%	1,707	2.54%	-7,013	-10.45%	67,118
Totals	1,676,335	50.06%	1,595,761	47.65%	76,718	2.29%	80,574	2.41%	3,348,814

==== By congressional district ====
Gallego won five of nine congressional districts, including two that elected Republicans.

District	Gallego	Lake	Representative elected
1st	52%	47%	David Schweikert
2nd	45%	53%	Eli Crane
3rd	73%	24%	Ruben Gallego (118th Congress)
3rd	73%	24%	Yassamin Ansari (119th Congress)
4th	56%	41%	Greg Stanton
5th	43%	55%	Andy Biggs
6th	51%	46%	Juan Ciscomani
7th	63%	33%	Raúl Grijalva
8th	45%	53%	Debbie Lesko (118th Congress)
8th	45%	53%	Abraham Hamadeh (119th Congress)
9th	38%	60%	Paul Gosar

== Notes ==
Partisan clients
