= Peter Giunta =

Peter Giunta may refer to:

- Peter Giunta (American football) (born 1956), American football coach
- Peter Giunta (political operative) (born 1993 or 1994), American political operative in New York
