= Isabella DeLuca =

American political activist (born 2000)

- Born: February 1, 2000 (age 26); Setauket, New York, U.S.
- Education: Stony Brook University (BA)
- Organization(s): Turning Point USA, Republicans for National Renewal
- Political party: Republican

Isabella Maria DeLuca (born February 1, 2000) is an American conservative political activist and social media personality. She was among those charged for participating in the January 6 United States Capitol attack, but was later pardoned on January 20, 2025, the first day of the second presidency of Donald Trump, along with nearly every other participant in the attack.

== Early life ==
DeLuca was raised in Setauket, New York. She attended Stony Brook University, where she served as an ambassador for Turning Point USA. She spoke at a September 2021 anti-vaccine rally on campus organized by the university's Turning Point chapter. In October 2021, DeLuca claimed that she faced expulsion from the university for refusing to receive a COVID-19 vaccine, which was mandated by the school at the time. She graduated in 2022 with a bachelor's degree in political science.

== Career ==
On October 17, 2020, DeLuca, while serving as the outreach director for the Republicans for National Renewal, attended a counter-protest to the Women's March at the Supreme Court of the United States in Washington, D.C. DeLuca claimed she was "punched in the face and choked by two women" in the Women's March for "holding a Trump flag here at the Supreme Court". The Women's March was organized to oppose the confirmation of Amy Coney Barrett to the Supreme Court. Snopes concluded that there was no evidence to support DeLuca's claims that she was attacked by Black Lives Matter activists and that "the evidence and testimony in support of the claim that she was the victim of a unilateral assault, as opposed to being hurt during a fight, or even after instigating violence, is not definitive."

In April 2021, DeLuca began working as an intern for New York representative Lee Zeldin. DeLuca worked as an intern for Arizona representative Paul Gosar from September 12, 2022, to January 30, 2023.

In January 2024, DeLuca was involved in a social media altercation with former Major League Baseball player Aubrey Huff, which led to Huff temporarily deleting his Twitter account.

== Involvement in January 6 United States Capitol attack ==
On March 15, 2024, DeLuca was arrested in Irvine, California, for allegedly participating in the January 6 United States Capitol attack, being charged with theft of government property, entering a restricted building, disorderly conduct and demonstrating in a Capitol building. According to a complaint filed in the US District Court for the District of Columbia, DeLuca helped steal a table which was used as a weapon against law enforcement. After passing it out of a broken window, she used her cellphone to record the rioting and later deleted social media posts in a likely attempt to thwart a criminal investigation.

Following her arrest, the Gold Institute for International Strategy, which hired DeLuca as an unpaid volunteer media associate responsible for updating the institute's online social media profile, said they "felt it necessary to sever our relationship" with DeLuca.

On January 20, 2025, she was pardoned by President Donald Trump for her alleged role in the January 6 United States Capitol attack.

== Reception ==
Slate credited DeLuca's popularity partially to being "young, blond, and conventionally attractive", but also for her social media profile as "a brash, outspoken, attractive woman professing traditional ideas about gender norms, with her sexuality often framed as being reserved for a theoretical 'future husband'." The South China Morning Post described her as a "glam conservative influencer" who may be the "female Andrew Tate".

== See also ==
- List of cases of the January 6 United States Capitol attack (A-F)
- Criminal proceedings in the January 6 United States Capitol attack
- List of people granted executive clemency in the second Trump presidency
