= New York Young Republican Club =

American political youth organization

- President: Stefano L. Forte
- Vice President: Brent A. Morden
- Founded: 1911
- Headquarters: New York City
- Ideology: National conservatism Fiscal conservatism Social conservatism
- Mother party: Manhattan Republican Party
- National affiliation: Young Republican National Federation (Republican Party)
- Website: nyyrc.com

The New York Young Republican Club (NYYRC) is an organization for members of the Republican Party between the ages of 18 and 40 in Manhattan. The New York Young Republican Club is the oldest and largest chapter in the United States, founded in 1911 with predecessor organizations going back to 1856. The club is affiliated with and officially recognized by the New York State Young Republicans and the Young Republican National Federation, as well as the borough, state, and national Republican committees.

New York City Republican organizations were once a bastion of moderate Republicans with liberal or centrist views on social issues, but since the election of Donald Trump have moved sharply to the political right.

== History ==
=== Founding ===
In April 1911, thirty-two young men, led by a young Manhattan lawyer Benjamin M. Day, along with, Philip J. McCook, Lloyd Carpenter Griscom, Frederick Paul Keppel, Henry W. Goddard, Edward R. Finch, Alfred Conkling Coxe Jr., Lindon Bates Jr., Thomas D. Thacher, Albert S. Bard, and Robert McC. Marsh, formed the New York Young Republican Club. This was an offshoot of the earlier New York Young Men's Republican Club, founded in 1879 amid the rise of political clubs, which itself was a descendant of the even earlier New York Young Men's Republican Union founded in 1856.

The club's first public appearance was a dinner held in December 1911. The guest of honor was the President of the United States, William Howard Taft, and the principal speaker was Idaho Senator William Borah.

In 1930, the New York Young Republican Club circulated a questionnaire to its members; of the 649 responses, an overwhelming number (424) supported the repeal of the Eighteenth Amendment (which prohibited alcohol), 117 favored modification of the Volstead Act, and only 108 favored enforcement of prohibition.

=== Dewey administration ===
The New York Young Republican Club was significant to the political network of Governor Thomas Dewey. Club members were important parts of Dewey's campaigns for governor and president, and in 1952 and 1956, Dewey used the club to promote the presidential campaigns of Dwight D. Eisenhower. In the 1950s, John V. Lindsay, later mayor of New York City, joined the organization, which was an all-male group at the time. He became vice president of the group in 1951 and (after Eisenhower's win in 1952, became president of the group). During his presidency of the group, Lindsay was involved in an acrimonious internal battle between a faction led by Charles Miller Metzner (to whom Lindsay belonged) and a rival faction led by F. Clifton White and William A. Rusher.

=== 1964 elections ===
In 1964, The New York Times described the club as "not a large one" but "old and influential in Young Republican affairs." That year, the club was described as having 1,200 members citywide.

Amid the 1964 Republican presidential contest between New York's Republican Governor Nelson Rockefeller and Arizona Senator Barry Goldwater, a pro-Rockefeller faction won the club's presidency by a vote of 365–202 over an independent candidate running with conservative support. The group endorsed Rockeller's campaign for the Republican presidential nomination by a 184–6 votes, and endorsed, by a 187–1 vote, the re-nomination of state Senator MacNeil Mitchell, who was facing an insurgent primary challenge from Jacob Javits's nephew Eric Javits. The same year, the Club supported John V. Lindsay's decision to run for re-election as mayor as an independent Republican; the group broke from the leaders of other Young Republican clubs in the city, such as those of City College, New York University, Columbia College, and Fordham University, as well as the Young Women's Republican Club of New York, all of whom condemned Lindsay's decision.

=== Since 2016 ===
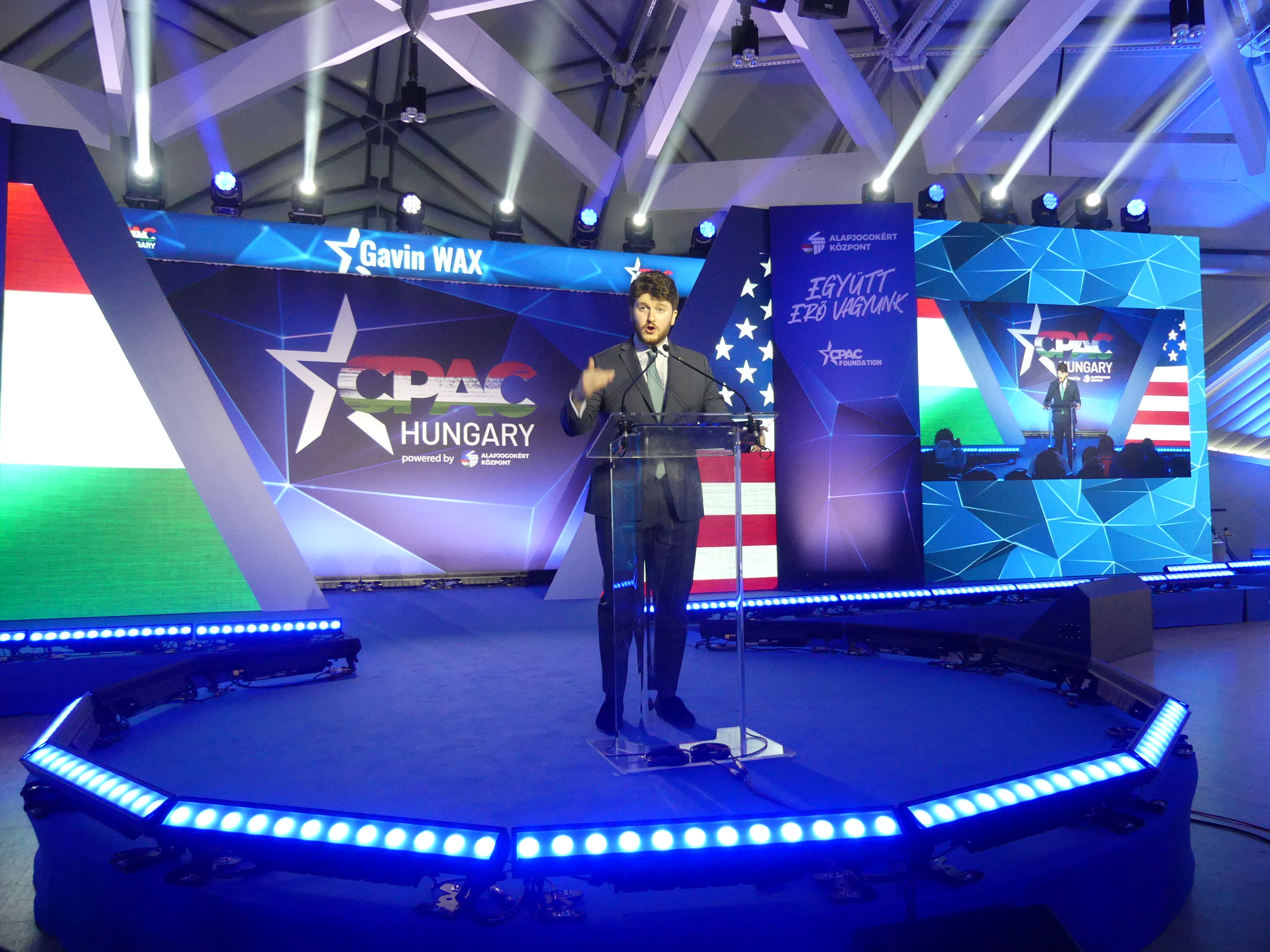
Gavin Wax speaking at CPAC Hungary in 2023

After the rise of Donald Trump, the city's Republican groups moved decidedly to the right. In 2018, two relatively new members of the club, Gavin Wax and Vish Burra were elected president and vice president respectively. Their goal was to grow the club through parties (e.g., alcohol), militant rhetoric, and endorsing "controversial far-right figures". Wax has attended conferences which featured white nationalists, while Michelle Malkin, a NYYRC board member, has praised white nationalists. In December 2020, amid the COVID-19 pandemic, the New York Young Republican Club hosted a gala in Jersey City, New Jersey where the participants flouted public health guidelines. Dozens gathered in crowds indoors, did not wear masks, and did not socially distance. Matt Gaetz, a Republican congressman from Florida, and James O'Keefe, a journalist, attended the party. New Jersey's Democratic Governor Phil Murphy criticized it.

The club endorsed the re-election of Brazilian president Jair Bolsonaro in the 2022 Brazilian presidential election. When Bolsonaro narrowly lost, the club accused Brazilian left-wing parties of mass voter fraud (without offering any evidence in support of this assertion), claimed that Bolsonaro was the rightful winner, and endorsed a military coup to keep Bolsonaro in power.

In December 2022, the club held a gala event in Manhattan that featured both Republican politicians and far-right extremists. At the event, Republican congresswoman Marjorie Taylor Greene told attendees that if she and former Trump advisor Stephen K. Bannon had organized the January 6 United States Capitol attack, "we would have won" and "it would have been armed." Given top billing for the gala were Taylor Greene, Jack Posobiec, and Donald Trump Jr.; featured as "special guests" were three newly elected incoming Republican House members—George Santos of New York, Cory Mills of Florida, and Mike Collins of Georgia. Also attending the event were Newsweek opinion editor Josh Hammer, Peter Brimelow, and members of the Freedom Party of Austria and Alternative for Germany.

Vish Burra served as congressional director of operations for former politician and convicted felon George Santos. In November 2025, Vish Burra was fired from his job as the host on a One America News Network show after sharing a brazenly anti-Semitic video on X, formerly Twitter. Burra had been a booker and scriptwriter for The Matt Gaetz Show. The AI-generated cartoon of Burra showed him "barging into a 'Scheming Room' – that was emblazoned with the Star of David – and threatening a group of Jews that were depicted as cockroaches."

In March 2023, media chairman Lucian Wintrich coordinated a club event featuring Roger Stone and the hosts of the Red Scare podcast. On July 31, 2023, the club endorsed Salvadoran President Nayib Bukele's re-election campaign ahead of the 2024 Salvadoran presidential election.

At the club's December 2023 gala, headlined by Donald Trump, media chairman Lucian Wintrich challenged a rule barring reporters from speaking with guests. Club president Gavin Wax subsequently allowed Vanity Fair reporter Caleb Ecarma to mingle with attendees.

On April 17, 2025, the club endorsed Gonzalo Duran for the position of New York City Public Advocate. Duran is a member of the Conservative Party and has also received the endorsement of the Republican Party. He is currently the only Conservative Party member to have received the club's endorsement.

Duran has collaborated with the club on various events, most notably on August 2, 2025, in relation to an anti-socialism campaign.

On October 20, 2025, several members of the New York Young Republicans attended as guests the “National Gathering to Commemorate the Inauguration of Party President Sanae Takaichi,” an event hosted by the Japanese conservative, revisionist group Tsukurukai (“Japanese Society for History Textbook Reform”), which celebrated the appointment of Takaichi—known as an ultra-conservative—as prime minister of Japan and president of the Liberal Democratic Party.

Following a dispute over its December 2025 gala, the club removed Lucian Wintrich as press committee chairman. In January 2026, it sued him in New York Supreme Court, seeking $5 million and alleging defamation and breaches of non-disparagement and confidentiality agreements. Wintrich described his remarks as opinion and said the suit was intended to deter criticism and oversight.

Club President Stefano Forte, elected in 2025, attended a remigration event in Portugal. Former club members alleged that Forte had fostered a hostile atmosphere towards Jewish members of the club, with club members under his leadership expressing pro-Groyper opinions. The club's former treasurer, Nicholas Rafael, allegedly operated an antisemitic and Islamophobic anonymous X account, and was photographed giving a Nazi salute while wearing German military garb. Following the support of the allegations from multiple former club members, Rafael denied owning the account and claimed the photo was doctored. Rafael was later suspended from his position. Following New York magazine's investigation of Rafael's conduct, New York City Council member Inna Vernikov, who had previously condemned right-wing antisemitism, announced she left the club.

The group has been described as shifting further to the right following the departure of its former President Gavin Wax, as demonstrated by its participation in the remigration event and its support for visit to and support for Orania, an all-white enclave in South Africa.

== See also ==
- Young Republicans
- College Republicans
- Teen Age Republicans
- Republicans Overseas
- Republican National Committee
- New York Republican State Committee
