= Jon Decker =

American journalist

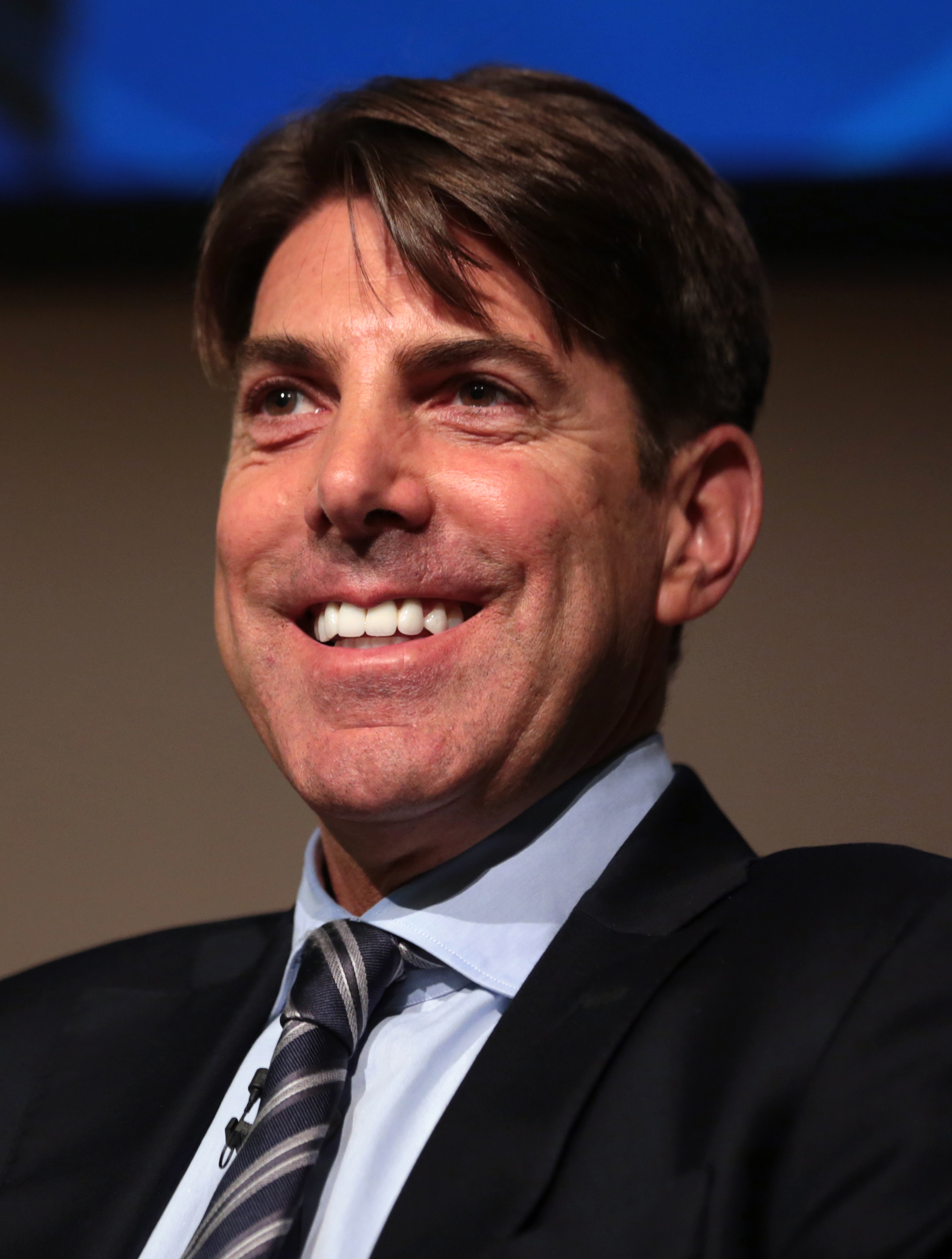
- Decker in 2017
- Born: Jonathan P. Decker; October 18, 1966; Washington, D.C., US
- Education: University of Pennsylvania (B.A., M.A.); George Washington University (J.D.)
- Occupation(s): Journalist, radio host, White House correspondent
- Notable credit: Fox News Radio

Jonathan P. Decker is an American journalist and White House correspondent. Since 1995, he has served as a member of the White House press corps, and is correspondent for Gray Television and iHeartMedia. From 2014 to 2021, Decker was the White House correspondent for Fox News Radio. He was also previously a White House correspondent for SiriusXM's "White House Insider" program, and several other news organizations.

== Early life and education ==
Decker was born in Washington, D.C., and attended the Wharton School at the University of Pennsylvania, before becoming a financial analyst on Wall Street for the Manufacturers Hanover Trust Company. After leaving Wall Street, Decker became an aide to U.S. Senator John Heinz, Republican of Pennsylvania, while also pursuing his master's degree at the University of Pennsylvania in International Relations.

== Career ==
Following the death of Senator Heinz, Decker fully pursued a career in journalism, where he first hosted a radio program on Pennsylvania public radio, as well as anchoring local cut-ins for CNN Headline News. Decker then relocated to Miami, Florida, where he joined NBC Radio as their Miami correspondent, as well as The Christian Science Monitor and WTVJ, the local NBC affiliate in Miami. While there, Decker covered stories such as the Major League Baseball strike, Hurricane Andrew, and reported from Cuba and Haiti.

In 1995, Decker moved back to Washington, D.C. to take a position as reporter and producer of the PBS program Nightly Business Report, where he covered the 1996 U.S. presidential election, and the government shutdown.

Decker became part of the White House Press Corps in 1995 and is an elected member of the Board of the White House Correspondents' Association. Decker was a White House correspondent for Reuters Television and SiriusXM, including for their program "White House Insider". In December 2014, it was announced that Decker had joined Fox News Radio as their White House correspondent.

In March 2017, Decker was involved in a controversy in which he confronted a reporter from The Gateway Pundit, Lucian Wintrich, a Gay Jewish reporter, and announced to the White House briefing room that Wintrich's news organization hated "blacks, Jews, Hispanics," according to a BuzzFeed reporter. In March 2022 Decker added the duties of White House Correspondent for iHeartMedia
