= Bull Moose Project =

American non-profit political organization

- Bull Moose Project
- Abbreviation: BMP
- Legal status: 501(c)(4) Nonprofit Organization
- Location: United States of America
- President: Aiden Buzzetti
- Website: https://bullmooseproject.org

The Bull Moose Project (BMP) is a nonprofit political organization which seeks to "revive the spirit of the Progressive era." The purpose of the organization is to "identify, train and develop the next generation of American leaders and policies."

== History ==
Throughout 2023 and 2024 the Bull Moose Project pushed for candidates seeking political offices in the 2024 United States elections to take a pledge that they wouldn't accept donations from Big Tech companies. During 2025, the BMP pushed for the Department of Justice to take antitrust actions against Big Tech companies such as Apple, later in the year the BMP made claims that the Security Industry Association was cooperating with Chinese corporations to disrupt efforts pushing for the use of 5G technology to back GPS within the United States.

== See also ==
- Bull Moose Party
