= Young Republican group chat leaks =

October 2025 American political scandal

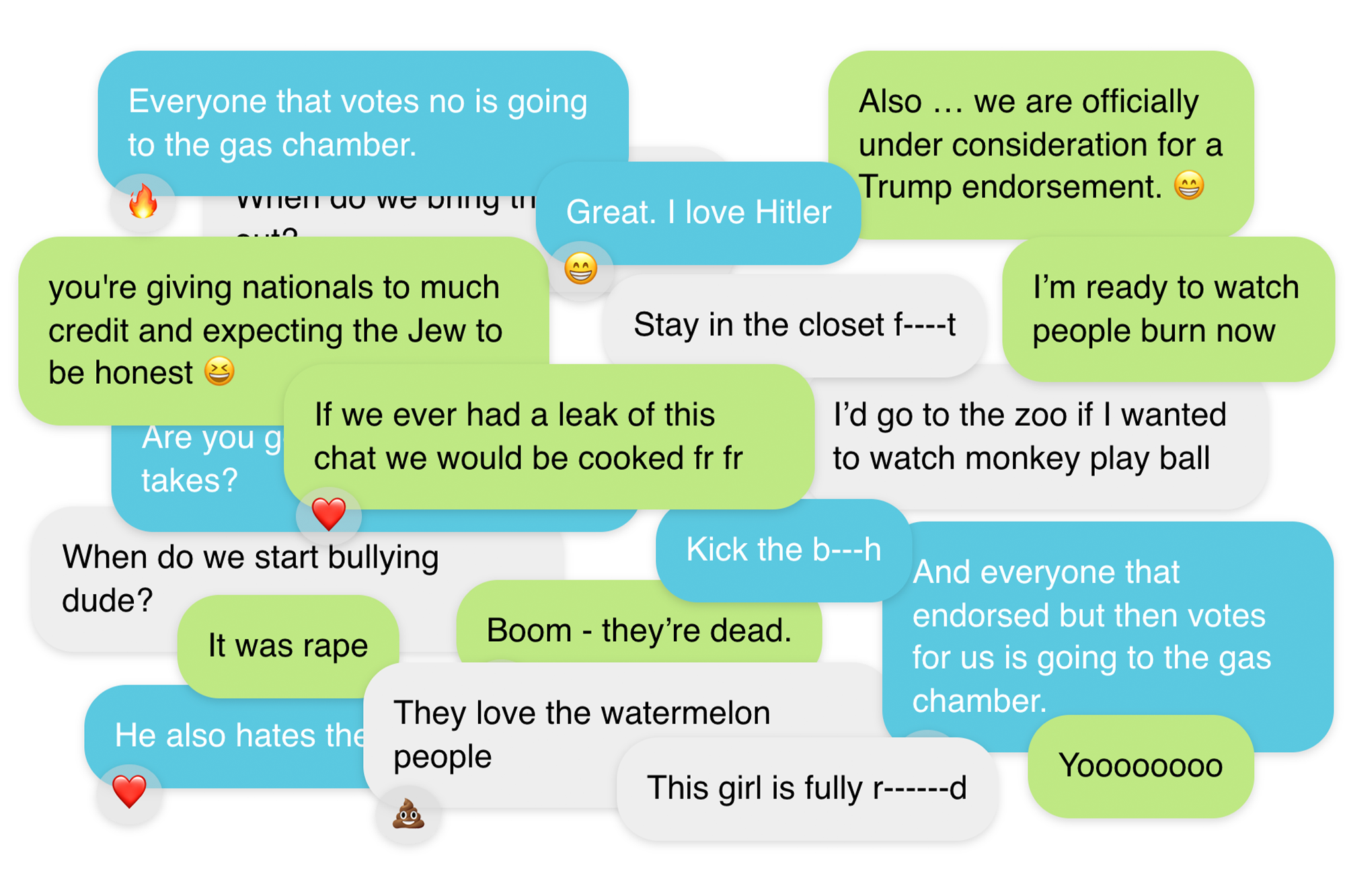
Example of the texts sent in the Young Republican group chats as published by Politico

On October 14, 2025, Politico reported on 2,900 pages of leaked Telegram chats, spanning a seven-month period, from leaders of the Young Republicans in several U.S. states. Many participants worked in government or party politics, including state senator Samuel Douglass and senior Trump official Michael Bartels, an adviser in the U.S. Small Business Administration.

The Politico article argued that "the messages reveal a culture where racist, antisemitic and violent rhetoric circulate freely — and where the Trump-era loosening of political norms has made such talk feel less taboo among those positioning themselves as the party's next leaders".

The New York State Young Republicans includes members aged 18 to 40. It recruits and trains young people to run for political office.

== Leaked chat ==
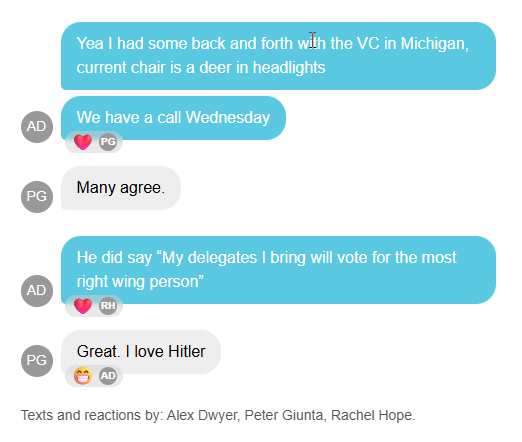
Conversation from the chat involving Alex Dwyer, Peter Giunta and Rachel Hope as published by Politico

Leaked Telegram messages contained over 28,000 exchanges from January to August 2025 among leaders of Young Republican chapters in Arizona, Vermont, Kansas, and New York, including at least one member from the Trump administration.

The chat discussed votes, social media strategies, and logistics. It also included racist and antisemitic slurs, white supremacist slogans and symbols, comments encouraging rape of political opponents to drive them to suicide, praise for Adolf Hitler, promotion of gas chambers, and enthusiasm for Republicans believed to support slavery. Giunta and its members referred to Black people as monkeys and "the watermelon people". One member stated "I'd go to the zoo if I wanted to watch monkey play ball" about an invitation to an NBA game. The slurs faggot, retard, and nigger appeared over 251 times. In discussing Giunta's defeat in an election for chair of the Young Republicans National Federation, Walker called for the winner to be raped. When referring to a colleague's girlfriend, Walker stated she was a "stinky, obese Indian woman". He said would "love to see" an opponent get raped, and described the colonial sexual violence perpetrated by Spanish explorers in the 1700s as "epic".

Members of the group chat included:

- Peter Giunta, former chair of the New York State Young Republicans.
- Samuel Douglass, state senator from northern Vermont
- Bobby Walker, chair of the New York State Young Republicans and former vice chair.
- Brianna Douglass, Samuel Douglass's wife
- William Hendrix, vice chair of Kansas Young Republicans
- Alex Dwyer, chair of the Kansas Young Republicans
- Annie Kaykaty, New York's national committee member
- Joe Maligno, general counsel for the New York State Young Republicans
- Luke Mosiman, Arizona Young Republicans
- Rachel Hope, Arizona Young Republicans events chair

=== Bobby Walker ===
Bobby Walker is an American Republican Party operative who served as the chairman of the Association of New York Young Republican Clubs from September to October 2025 who resigned amid the group chat leaks. Walker is a native of Cooperstown, New York.

Walker served as the vice chair of the New York Young Republicans until September 2025, when he ascended to the role of chair after New York Young Republicans leader Peter Giunta resigned amid financial scandal. During the racist and homophobic group chat, Walker was serving as vice chair. He previously served on the staff of New York State Senate minority leader Rob Ortt as a communications manager. In addition to his role with Ortt, he served as the chairman of the Otsego County Young Republicans from 2015 until 2017, the chairman of the New York Federation of College Republicans from 2019 until 2021 and as the digital director of the New York Republican State Committee from 2020 until 2022.

Walker's comments were condemned by Schenectady County Republican Party chair Liz Joy, saying ""It has come to my attention that the State Chairman of the New York State Young Republicans, Bobby Walker resides in Schenectady County. An article published in Politico this afternoon revealed deeply offensive and disturbing chats between Young Republican state and national leaders, including Mr. Walker. I want to begin by pointing out that Bobby is not a committee member in Schenectady County nor does he have any consulting or other position with us. His statements in the published chat were indefensible and do not in any way represent the values or standards that I demand from the members of our committee. I want to be crystal clear, anyone who degrades or bullies' [sic] others in a similar way to Mr. Walker will find themselves off our committee and out of any leadership position. We have a zero-tolerance policy for that behavior."

Walker was slated to manage the congressional campaign of Senator Peter Oberacker, but his job offer was rescinded after Walker's participation in the leaked Young Republican group chat was reported. He previously served as Oberacker's senatorial campaign manager in 2020.

== Aftermath ==
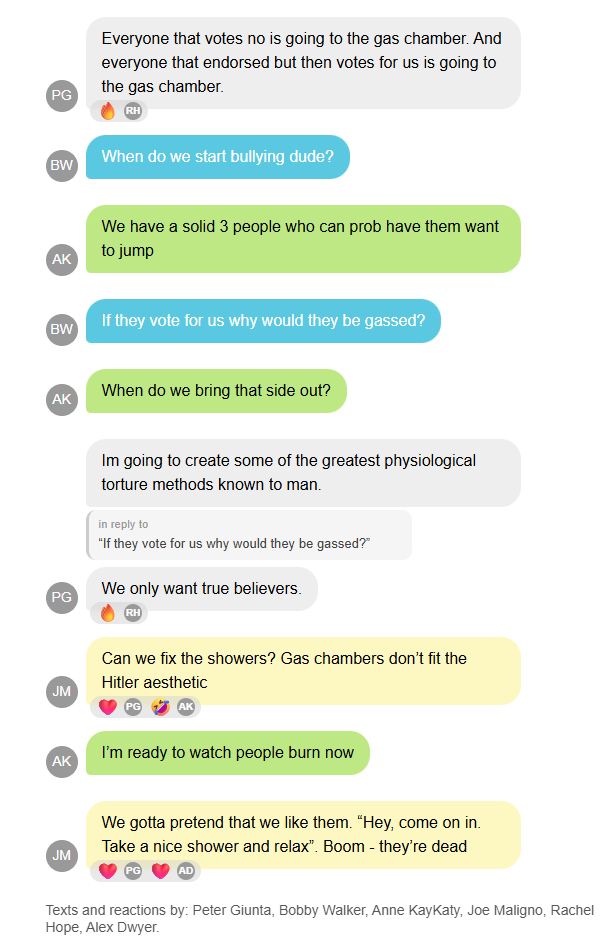
Conversation from the chat involving Luke Mosiman, Joe Maligno, Alex Dwyer, Bobby Walker and Rachel Hope as published by Politico

Some Young Republican members lost positions due to outrage over slurs, antisemitic, and misogynistic comments. Samuel Douglass, the only elected official in the chat, faced resignation calls from Vermont's Republican governor Phil Scott. Several social media accounts linked to chat members were deleted or set private after the leak.

On October 14, 2025, the Kansas Young Republicans group disbanded. The chat included messages from Kansas leaders Alex Dwyer and William Hendrix, who used racist and homophobic slurs and emojis responding to pro-Nazi content. As of October 16, 2025, Peter Giunta no longer worked for Republican New York Assembly member Mike Reilly, and Joseph Maligno no longer worked for the New York State Unified Court System.

On October 15, 2025, Politico reported on a modified American flag with a swastika found pinned to a cubicle wall in Republican Congressman David Taylor's office on Capitol Hill. These incidents, a day apart, drew condemnation about the prevalence of Nazi ideology in the Republican Party.

On October 17, 2025, New York GOP executive board officials voted unanimously to suspend the Young Republicans' New York chapter. Party chair Ed Cox stated that "vile language of the sort made in the group chat has no place in our party or its subsidiary organizations". A New York state Republican official, speaking anonymously to The New York Times, said disbanding would allow a fresh start by eliminating the group's charter to reconstitute it with new leadership.

Vermont state senator Samuel Douglass announced his resignation on October 17, 2025, stating, "offense was taken and people were hurt, so I will mend bridges to the best of my ability ... Since the story broke, I have reached out to the majority of my Jewish and BIPOC friends and colleagues to ensure that they can be honest and upfront with me, and I know that as a young person I have a duty to set a good example for others". Brianna Douglass has also resigned from her position as the Vermont Young Republican's national committee member.

== Reactions ==
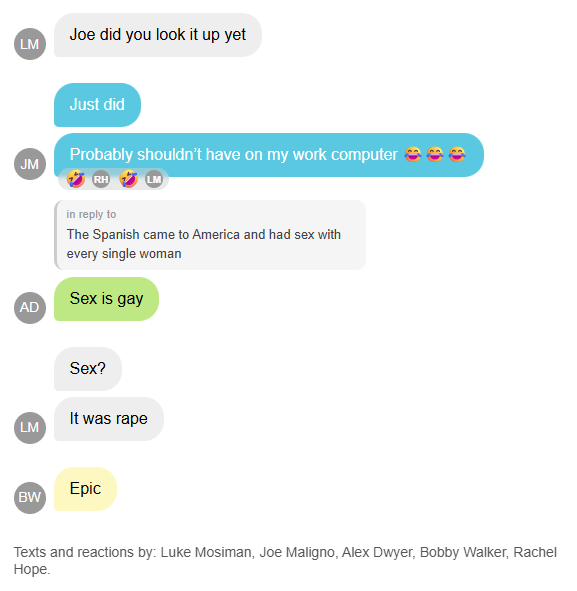
Conversation from the chat involving Luke Mosiman, Joe Maligno, Alex Dwyer, Bobby Walker and Rachel Hope as published by Politico

The leaked messages drew widespread condemnation. Several participants lost their political positions within days. Some apologized for the messages and their context, while others declined to comment or claimed alteration, lack of context, or manipulation.

Media outlets critiqued the potential implications for the Republican Party and expressed concern about moral decline. Gizmodo stated that "if you read some of the political analysis that's followed, this is just a peek at the future of the Republican Party. But ... The future is now". George Packer, in The Atlantic, wrote that "once morality is rotted out by partisan relativism, the floor gives way and the fall into nihilism is swift". The Nation noted that "the extreme right is such a large faction in the party, especially among the young, that disavowal is politically costly. Both Trump and Vance are shrewd enough to know that Young Republicans who post 'I love Hitler' on chats are the future of the GOP".

=== Republicans ===
A White House spokesperson dismissed links between the messages and President Donald Trump's rhetoric or actions, stating that "only an activist, left-wing reporter would desperately try to tie President Trump into a story about a random groupchat he has no affiliation with." The spokesperson added that "no one has been subjected to more vicious rhetoric and violence than President Trump and his supporters."

Republican Vice President JD Vance declined to condemn the chat. He compared it to Jay Jones and his controversial comments from an unrelated earlier leak. Vance called Jones's comments "far worse" without addressing the Young Republicans' rhetoric. MSNBC noted Vance's "first instinct was to downplay the scandal and go after a Democrat". CNN described Vance's response as the "epitome of the MAGA movement's evolution on hateful rhetoric", noting "The moral high ground is out; whataboutism is very much in", and that Roger Stone denounced the comments. The Atlantic called Vance's deflection an ambitious "calculated response" to consolidate the MAGA base and succeed Donald Trump in 2028, stating "in the racist provocations of conservative cadres, Vance clearly sees the future of the party he intends to lead".

Representative Elise Stefanik initially condemned some of the Young Republicans who she had promoted and financially supported in the past. However, she quickly pivoted within minutes of JD Vance's deflections and his refusal to seriously address the racist group chat messages. Stefanik shifted to calling the Politico story a "hit piece" and said that Democrats who had raised the alarm were "hyperventilating".

House Speaker Mike Johnson stated on October 16, 2025, after the leak and swastika images from David Taylor's office surfaced, that "we roundly condemn any of that nonsense". Asked if he had concerns about pro-Nazi sympathies among young Republicans, Johnson replied, "No".

Representative Mike Collins chose to shift the focus away from the leaked messages, writing on social media "I don't care about some group chat", followed by a photo of Laken Riley, a Georgia nursing student who was murdered by an undocumented immigrant in 2024.

Far-right streamer Myron Gaines, co-host of the Fresh and Fit Podcast, defended the racist comments. He posted "[y]eah, we like Hitler. No one gives a fuck what you woke jews think anymore", calling Hitler "a revolutionary leader" who "saved" Germany. Gaines posted an image of himself superimposed on Hitler, writing "Hitler was a real nigga and no one gives a fuck what stupid outlets you fruit loops say". Andrew Torba, CEO of alt-right social network Gab, defended the rhetoric as "tame", writing "[t]hey have no idea what's coming".

=== Democrats ===
Senate Minority Leader Chuck Schumer and House Minority Leader Hakeem Jeffries urged Republican leaders to address the chat. California governor Gavin Newsom called for a congressional antisemitism investigation of the Young Republicans.

New York Governor Kathy Hochul highlighted in election materials her opponent Representative Elise Stefanik's ties to some members. Hochul called out participants and urged consequences to stop the rhetoric. The Democratic Congressional Campaign Committee and House Majority PAC used chat content in battleground state campaigns.

Representative Yvette Clarke, chair of the Congressional Black Caucus, quoted racial slurs against Black people from the chat, stating concern that "when we say white supremacy is thriving on the right, they call us reactionary" and that "the Republican Party embraces bigotry". Representative Grace Meng, chair of the Congressional Asian Pacific American Caucus, said that "members' willingness to use such rhetoric behind closed doors showed their character and the tone set by national leadership".

== Similar incidents ==
In March 2026, the Miami Herald reported that a leaked group chat created by the secretary of the Republican Party of Miami-Dade County, Florida, for conservative students contained racist, sexist, antisemitic, and homophobic messages. The Miami Herald wrote that the group chat "reveals the extent of racism and extremism within the highest ranks of campus Republican Party leadership in Miami at a time Florida's Republicans are reckoning with an increasingly emboldened far right".

Miami-Dade County Republican Party Chairman Kevin J. Cooper called for the resignation of those involved and commenced removal proceedings against Carvajal. U.S. Senator Rick Scott called the messages "disgusting" and said "racists and antisemites are not welcome in the Republican Party".

== See also ==
- David Taylor swastika incident
- Elon Musk salute controversy
- United States government group chat leaks
