= Peter Giunta (political operative) =

American political operative (born circa 1993)

Chair of the Association of New York State Young Republican Clubs
- In office August 2021 – September 2025
- Preceded by: Brian Maher
- Succeeded by: Bobby Walker

Personal details
- Born: 1993/1994 (age 31–32)
- Party: Republican

Peter Giunta (born 1993 or 1994) is an American Republican Party operative who served as the chairman of the Association of New York Young Republican Clubs from 2021 until his resignation amid the Young Republican group chat leaks scandal in 2025.

== Early life and education ==
Giunta was born in 1993 or 1994. While in high school, Giunta interned for New York City Councilman Vincent M. Ignizio. Giunta earned a degree in public administration from Empire State College.

== Career ==
When Giunta was eighteen, he worked on Joe Borelli's campaign for New York State Assembly. After Borelli was elected, Giunta continued to work for him for six years as a special assistant and then deputy chief of staff. Giunta was also deputy campaign manager for Marc Molinaro's 2018 campaign for New York governor.

Giunta served as chief of staff to New York State Assemblyman Michael Reilly beginning in December 2018. In August 2021, Giunta was elected as the Chair of the Association of New York State Young Republican Clubs (NYSYR) in August 2021, becoming the second Staten Islander to hold the role as chair of the organization.

Giunta was listed in City & State's "2019 New York City 40 Under 40 Rising Stars" and "2023 Staten Island Power 100". He previously led the Staten Island Young Republicans. Giunta unsuccessfully campaigned to lead the National Young Republicans in 2024.

Amid allegations by the New York Young Republican Club (Note: The New York Young Republican Club (NYYRC) is a city-level Young Republicans organization. The Association of New York State Young Republican Clubs (NYSYR) was a separate organization that serves as an umbrella group for Young Republican organizations statewide.) of "serious potential financial misconduct" at the NYSYR, Giunta resigned as Chair on September 23, 2025. He reportedly failed to pay a $14,000 hotel bill in Syracuse, New York and took lavish vacations funded by the NYSYR account. Giunta was fired from Reilly's staff in October 2025, after group text messages that were racist and xenophobic in nature were leaked following an investigation by Politico.

=== Leaked messages ===
On October 14, 2025, Politico reported on 2,900 pages of leaked Telegram chats, spanning over a seven-month period, from leaders of the Young Republicans in several U.S. states. The Politico article argued that "the messages reveal a culture where racist, antisemitic and violent rhetoric circulate freely — and where the Trump-era loosening of political norms has made such talk feel less taboo among those positioning themselves as the party's next leaders".

The chat discussed votes, social media strategies, and logistics. It also included racist and antisemitic slurs, white supremacist slogans and symbols, comments encouraging rape of political opponents to drive them to suicide, praise for Adolf Hitler, promotion of gas chambers, and enthusiasm for Republicans believed to support slavery. Giunta in particular joked about putting his political opponents in gas chambers and wrote "I love Hitler". Giunta and its members referred to Black people as monkeys and "the watermelon people". One member stated "I'd go to the zoo if I wanted to watch monkey play ball" about an invitation to an NBA game. The slurs faggot, retard, and nigger appeared over 251 times. In discussing Giunta's defeat in an election for chair of the Young Republicans National Federation, one member called for the winner to be raped.

On October 15, 2025, Peter Giunta was terminated from his role in the office of Republican New York Assembly member Mike Reilly. On October 17, 2025, New York Republican State Committee executive board officials voted unanimously to suspend the NYSYR. Party chair Ed Cox stated that "vile language of the sort made in the group chat has no place in our party or its subsidiary organizations". A New York state Republican official, speaking anonymously to The New York Times, said disbanding would allow a fresh start by eliminating the group's charter to reconstitute it with new leadership.

== Personal life ==
Giunta lives in the Great Kills neighborhood of Staten Island.
