= List of Donald Trump 2024 presidential campaign organization endorsements =

List of notable state, municipal, sub-state, and local officials that have endorsed Donald Trump for the 2024 U.S. presidential election.

== Labor unions ==
- Florida Police Benevolent Association
- Fraternal Order of Police Chicago Lodge #7
- International Union of Police Associations
- National Association of Police Organizations
- National Border Patrol Council
- National Fraternal Order of Police
- United Association Steamfitters Local 638
- United Steelworkers Local 560

== Sports organizations ==
- Safari Club International

== Trade associations ==
- Associated Builders and Contractors
- Oil & Gas Workers Association

== Newspapers and media ==
- Hot Air
- Human Events
- The Jewish Press
- The Jewish Voice
- KHTS
- Las Vegas Review-Journal
- Maxim
- New York Post
- The New York Sun
- NewBostonPost
- Rhino Times
- The Santa Clarita Valley Signal
- Townhall
- Twitchy
- Washington Examiner
- The Washington Times

== Bands ==
- Rascal Flatts
- Thompson Square
- Village People

== County and regional political parties ==
- Cook County Republican Party
- Kings County Republican Party
- Manhattan Republican Party
- Shelby County Republican Party
- Staten Island Republican Party

== Political action committees ==
- America First Works
- America PAC
- Committee to Defeat the President
- Courageous Conservatives PAC
- LaRouche PAC
- MAGA Inc.
- NRA Political Victory Fund
- Save America
- Tea Party Patriots Citizens Fund
- Texas Patriots PAC

== Hill committees ==
- National Republican Congressional Committee

== Political groups ==
- 60 Plus Association
- ACT for America
- American Energy Alliance
- Americans for Limited Government
- American Principles Project
- Black Voices for Trump
- California ProLife Council
- California Rifle and Pistol Association
- CatholicVote.org
- Center for Arizona Policy
- Christian Civic League of Maine
- Club for Growth
- Conservative Political Action Conference
- Deplorable Pride
- Faith and Freedom Coalition
- Family Research Council
- Gays for Trump
- Hindu Sena
- Illinois Family Institute
- Michigan Farm Bureau
- National Diversity Coalition for Trump
- National Rifle Association
- National Right to Life Committee
- New York State Rifle and Pistol Association
- Operation Rescue
- Priests for Life
- Proud Boys
- Republicans for National Renewal
- Students for Life of America
- Students for Trump
- Susan B. Anthony Pro-Life America
- Tea Party Express
- Tea Party Patriots
- The Conservative Caucus
- Turning Point Action
- Women for America First
- Women for Trump

== Republican party organizations ==
- California College Republicans
- College Republicans of America
- High School Republican National Federation
- Log Cabin Republicans
- National Black Republican Association
- National Federation of Republican Assemblies
- National Federation of Republican Women
- New York Federation of College Republicans
- New York Young Republican Club
- Pasadena Republican Club
- Penn State College Republicans
- Republican Governors Association
- Republican Hindu Coalition
- Republican Jewish Coalition
- Republican Liberty Caucus
- Republican National Hispanic Assembly
- Republicans Overseas
- Young Republicans

== State political parties ==
- Alabama Republican Party
- Alaska Republican Party
- American Samoa Republican Party
- Arizona Republican Party
- Arkansas Republican Party
- California Republican Party
- Colorado Republican Party
- Connecticut Republican Party
- Conservative Party of New York State
- Delaware Republican Party
- District of Columbia Republican Party
- Florida Republican Party
- Georgia Republican Party
- Guam Republican Party
- Hawaii Republican Party
- Idaho Republican Party
- Illinois Republican Party
- Indiana Republican Party
- Iowa Republican Party
- Kansas Republican Party
- Kentucky Republican Party
- Louisiana Republican Party
- Maine Republican Party
- Maryland Republican Party
- Massachusetts Republican Party
- Michigan Republican Party
- Minnesota Republican Party
- Mississippi Republican Party
- Missouri Republican Party
- Montana Republican Party
- Nebraska Republican Party
- Nevada Republican Party
- New Hampshire Republican State Committee
- New Jersey Republican Party
- New Mexico Republican Party
- New York Republican State Committee
- North Carolina Republican Party
- North Dakota Republican Party
- Ohio Republican Party
- Oklahoma Republican Party
- Oregon Republican Party
- Pennsylvania Republican Party
- Republican Party (Northern Mariana Islands)
- Republican Party of Puerto Rico
- Rhode Island Republican Party
- South Carolina Republican Party
- South Dakota Republican Party
- Tennessee Republican Party
- Texas Republican Party
- Utah Republican Party
- Vermont Republican Party
- Virginia Republican Party
- Virgin Islands Republican Party
- Washington Republican Party
- West Virginia Republican Party
- Wisconsin Republican Party
- Wyoming Republican Party
- Libertarian Party of New Hampshire

== Other ==
- Diamond and Silk
- Hodgetwins
- Nelk
- Richard and Elizabeth Uihlein

== See also ==
- List of Donald Trump 2020 presidential campaign state and territorial political endorsements
- List of Donald Trump 2024 presidential campaign political endorsements
- List of Kamala Harris 2024 presidential campaign sub-national officials endorsements
