= Eric Hoplin =

National Chairman of the College Republican National Committee
- In office 2003–2005
- Preceded by: Scott Stewart
- Succeeded by: Paul Gourley
- Constituency: College Republicans

Eric Hoplin, president and CEO of the National Association of Wholesaler-Distributors (NAW), represents 30,000 companies that account for one-third of the American economy. These companies supply businesses with the products they need to serve their customers in nearly every sector of commerce. He was previously head of external affairs for Wells Fargo & Co., and was executive director at Financial Services Roundtable, where he was in charge of operations and strategy for the organization. Previously, he was a management consultant with Booz Allen Hamilton. He is a former Republican organizer and official who was elected Deputy Chairman of the Republican Party of Minnesota in June 2005 and served until 2007. Prior to that he was Chairman of the College Republican National Committee (CRNC) in July 2003 and served until 2005.

== Biography ==
Eric Hoplin received a master's degree in international affairs from Columbia University's School of International and Public Affairs in 2009, a Master of Business Administration (MBA) from Augsburg College in 2005, a Bachelor of Arts from St. Olaf College in 2001, and a Certificate in change management from Georgetown University's McDonough School of Business in 2012. Hoplin is the vice president of communications & organizational strategy at the Financial Services Roundtable. Previously he was a lead associate with the consulting firm Booz Allen Hamilton where he consulted on public policy and strategy for the Departments of Defense and State. He also serves on the Reagan Ranch board of governors.

Hoplin is a former Republican organizer and official who was elected deputy chairman of the Republican Party of Minnesota in June 2005 and served until 2007. Prior to that he was elected chairman of the College Republican National Committee (CRNC) in July 2003 and served until 2005. Hoplin focused on strengthening the national College Republican organization's political influence during his tenure as chairman. His administration was the subject of a fund-raising scandal involving direct mail solicitations from senior citizens by Response Dynamics, Inc. Hoplin is credited and widely lauded for completing the task begun under predecessor Scott Stewart of terminating the decade old contract with Response Dynamics, Inc.

In 2004, Hoplin and his administration organized a program of paid field staffers to recruit College Republicans across the country, helping to provide volunteers for numerous Republican campaigns, including the successful reelection effort of President George W. Bush.

Hoplin chose not to run for reelection as CRNC chairman in 2005, pursuing the post of deputy chairman of the Minnesota Republican Party instead. He was elected to that position in June 2005. Hoplin was succeeded as CRNC chairman by Paul Gourley of South Dakota in a highly contested election against Michael Davidson. The contest gave rise to a rapid but short-lived proliferation of CRNC related blogs, most of which have since ceased publishing updated content.

In March 2007, Hoplin announced that he would not seek re-election to the position of deputy chairman of the Republican Party of Minnesota. He gave his reasons as wishing to continue a further education and work abroad.

Hoplin serves on the board of the Trust for the National Mall.

== See also ==
- Chairpersons of the College Republicans
