= Paul Gourley =

National Chairman of the College Republican National Committee
- In office 2005–2007
- Preceded by: Eric Hoplin
- Succeeded by: Charlie Smith
- Constituency: College Republicans

Personal details
- Education: University of South Dakota
- Profession: politician

Paul Gourley is former National Chairman of the College Republican National Committee in the United States.

Gourley, a native of Sioux Falls, South Dakota, was elected Chair of the College Republican National Committee in 2005. He won the chairmanship following a contested campaign against former California CR State Chairman Michael Davidson. The campaign focused on ethics and integrity issues surrounding the CRNC's fundraising activities and the organization's relationship with Response Dynamics in the previous years, while Gourley was the National Treasurer. His election and the preceding campaign received national press in The New Republic and other newspapers and news magazines, as well as a number of prominent conservative and liberal blogs.

During his tenure, Gourley expanded the Field Representative program.

Prior to his election as Chairman, Gourley's previous involvement in the College Republicans included time as the Vice-Chair of the South Dakota College Republican Federation, CRNC Field Representative in 2001 and 2002, and CRNC Treasurer from 2003-2005. He also chaired the youth campaign for then-Congressman John Thune's US Senate race in 2002. He was named CRNC Ronald Reagan Activist of the Year in 2003.

== See also ==
- Chairpersons of the College Republicans
