= Leadership Institute =

US nonprofit educational organization

Coordinates: 38°53′11.0″N 77°05′40.6″W

- Abbreviation: LI
- Formation: 1979 (47 years ago)
- Founder: Morton Blackwell
- Founded at: Arlington County, Virginia, U.S.
- Type: Nonprofit
- Tax ID no.: 51-0235174
- Legal status: 501(c)(3)
- Purpose: Education
- Headquarters: 1101 N Highland St; Arlington County, Virginia 22201-2807; United States
- Region served: United States
- President: Morton Blackwell
- Chairman: Morton Blackwell
- Revenue: $52.1 million (2024)
- Expenses: $54.7 million (2024)
- Endowment: $751,834 (2024)
- Staff: 272 (2024)
- Website: leadershipinstitute.org

The Leadership Institute is a 501(c)(3) non-profit organization located in Arlington, Virginia, that teaches conservatives to use political technology. The institute was founded in 1979 by conservative activist Morton Blackwell. Its mission is to "increase the number and effectiveness of conservative activists" and to "identify, train, recruit and place conservatives in politics, government, and media".

The Leadership Institute offers 44 types of training seminars at its Arlington headquarters, around the United States, and occasionally in foreign countries. In 2014, the Institute trained 18,182. Since its 1979 founding, the Leadership Institute has trained more than 161,271 students. Alumni include Grover Norquist, Ralph Reed, Jeff Gannon, Senator Mitch McConnell, Vice President Mike Pence, James O'Keefe, new members of the 113th Congress, and elected officials in all 50 states.

== Mission ==
The Leadership Institute's mission is to increase the number and effectiveness of conservative activists and leaders in the public policy process. To accomplish this, the Institute identifies, recruits, trains, and places conservatives in government, politics, and the media.

Founded in 1979 by its president, Morton C. Blackwell, the Leadership Institute (LI) teaches conservatives the nuts and bolts of how to succeed in the public policy process. The Institute strives to produce a new generation of public policy leaders unwavering in their commitment to free enterprise, limited government, strong national defense, and traditional values. Institute graduates are equipped with practical skills and professional training to implement sound principles through effective public policy.

The Leadership Institute is a member of the advisory board of Project 2025, a collection of conservative and right-wing policy proposals from the Heritage Foundation to reshape the United States federal government and consolidate executive power should the Republican nominee win the 2024 presidential election.

== Campus Reform ==
Campus Reform is LI's news website focused on higher education. The online publication's news offerings often highlight incidents of what it considers to be liberal bias on American college campuses.

== See also ==
- Republican National Committee
- Young Republicans
- Young Republican National Committee
- Young Republican National Federation
- College Republican National Committee
