= California College Republicans =

American organization of Republican college and university students

- Chairman: Colson Thomas (Pepperdine)
- Vice-Chairman: Andres Barillas (Cal State Fullerton)
- Founded: August 29, 1963; 63 years ago
- Headquarters: Orange County, CA
- Ideology: Conservatism; Fiscal conservatism Social conservatism Trumpism
- Mother party: Republican Party; California Republican Party
- Website: cacollegegop.com

The California College Republicans (CCR) is a California state organization for college and university students who support the Republican Party of the United States. Founded on August 29, 1963, the organization is the official chartered youth wing and a recruiting tool for the California Republican Party. It has produced many prominent republican and conservative activists, with notable alumni such as Kevin McCarthy, Ben Shapiro, and Kevin Kiley.

CCR is an independent political action committee (PAC) that is affiliated with the College Republicans of America (CRA).

== History ==
=== Founding and early history ===
CCR began with 1,800 members on August 29, 1963 — founded by Randolph Siefkin, Harold Phillips, William Nielsen, William Dillon, and Pete Wilson (who went on to serve as a US Senator from 1983 to 1991 and Governor of California from 1991 to 1999).

The 1963 mission statement of CCR read:

The specific and primary purposes for which this corporation is formed are to support the Republican party, to provide pleasure and recreation for the members, to encourage constructive thinking among young people and the development of their interest in good government, and to unite young people in the spirit of good fellowship to achieve these objectives.

CCR was formed as a break-off group of the California Young Republican College Federation, also known as the California College Federation of Young Republicans, which was a subcommittee of the California Federation of Young Republicans. This split occurred following election disputes in 1962 and 1963. In 1962, the moderates and conservatives violently clashed, with Walter Driver of the conservatives stating six sergeant-at-arms "banged my head into a chair and my body into a wall."

Harold Phillips of the moderates ultimately prevailed in the election as chair.

In 1963, competing conventions of a conservative wing and a moderate wing each elected new chairmen. Trent Devenney and Randy Siefkin each claimed legitimacy, with the California Young Republicans organization — at the time the parent organization of the college federation — set to recognize Devenney. At the same time, nationally, College Republican groups began to break off from the Young Republican groups, where one would service students and the other would service young adults. Siefkin helped lead this split in California, taking his moderate wing of students with him to form CCR. CCR would go on to charter with the College Republican National Committee (CRNC) (which it later separated from in 2019) after it broke off from the Young Republican National Federation. The California Young Republican College Federation continued to exist as part of the California Young Republicans and the Young Republican National Federation until 1969, when they merged with CCR in a unity election. The unification was supported and partially brokered by then-Governor Ronald Reagan.

Reagan enjoyed and worked closely with the youth — among them CCR members — during his campaigns and tenure. In 1988, he described CCR as "A group I take a kind of personal interest in..."

CCR also earned the admiration and attention of another President, Gerald Ford. In 1967, then-House Minority Leader Ford attended the annual CCR convention in Santa Barbara as the keynote speaker. He concluded with the following:

We must build the Republican Party ... We can do that if college Republicans here and throughout the Nation will rise to the responsibility that is theirs--the challenge to go out into the wilderness of young Democrats and come back with some scalps. The future of the Republican Party, ladies and gentlemen, is in your hands.

CCR conventions have featured a number of notable speakers over the years, including Gov. Pete Wilson, Gov. George Deukmejian, Lt. Gov. Edwin Reinecke, Lt. Gov. Mike Curb, Rep. Barry Goldwater Jr., Milo Yiannopoulos, Amb. Richard Grenell, Rep. Paul Gosar, and many others.

1963 was not the only time CCR faced competing conventions and claims of legitimacy. In 1987, Fred Whitaker (who went on to serve as Chairman of the Republican Party of Orange County) and Jim Michalski ran for chairman. Whitaker, unable to mount enough delegates to win the election, led a walkout at the 1987 election, hoping to break quorum. However, not enough delegates left with Whitaker, and the election proceeded with a vote for Michalski. Whitaker, meanwhile, convened his own convention with the delegates that followed him, where they elected him as chairman. This triggered a crisis over the rightful Chairman of CCR.

Whitaker was backed by CRNC Chairman Stockton Reeves, and Michalski was backed by the California Republican Party. The state party stepped in with, according to the San Francisco Examiner, "a private meeting trying to resolve a dispute between two college Republican groups." This led to party leadership, including CAGOP Chairman Bob Naylor, missing a vote of the party convention calling for the prosecution of the San Francisco AIDS foundation. The state party eventually caved to the CRNC and agreed to recognize both groups as equal and legitimate. They finally merged again in 1988, following a unity convention. In an interview with the Orange County Register, Whitaker said: "'I was running for chairman of the state College Republicans and we split into two organizations,' ... A 'unity convention' followed and both groups reunited a year later..." Whitaker was defeated by Michalski in the unity convention rematch election.

=== Modern history ===
Prior to the election of businessman Donald Trump in 2016, the California College Republicans had not had a contested election in nearly a decade. Trump's election sparked a resurgence of youth activism in California, which led to Ariana Rowlands' involvement in the College Republicans. In 2017, Rowlands built a socially conservative and pro-Trump coalition to contest the CCR heir apparent, Vice-chair Leesa Danzek, for the position of chairman. Danzek and her faction were considered the moderate-wing of CCR.

The 2017 convention was derailed before voting began, with the OC Register summarizing the events:

Hours-long debates on parliamentary procedures and questions about who could and couldn’t vote ended with student organizers booting more than 150 delegates from a Double Tree Hotel ballroom in San Jose, where the election was being held, into a hallway. The meeting dissolved into heated debates over procedures and by the time some delegates were allowed to return, it was too late. Hotel staff said it was time to go.

The CCR Convention was reconvened in October 2017 at the California Republican Party Fall Convention. By that point, Leesa Danzek had assumed the chairmanship following Ivy Allen's resignation in August. At the meeting, the LA Times reported that "[M]embers accused Danzek of using her influence over the state organization to withhold information about the election and improperly disqualify some students from voting"

Despite the tensions, Rowlands emerged the victor by a vote of 88–64.

Rowlands remained popular enough to win reelection in 2018, where she staged the largest attended CCR convention in modern history. She was listed as one of Washington Examiner's "30 Under 30," and brought renewed media attention to CCR from "FOX News, ABC 7 and The Daily Ledger ... Breitbart News ... TIME..."

However, she also faced scandal in her second term. Rowlands and her successor, Kimo Gandall, were accused of allegedly removing CCR members and chapters they disliked via the Judicial Board case Gandall et al. v Morcott et al, which found two members guilty of violating the CCR constitution and stripped their voting rights. According to the Judicial case in question, no further action was taken, and the members and chapters in question remained part of CCR. The case order read:

[O]rder (1) does not imply formal expulsion from the California College Republicans ... order (3) does not imply the permanent forced dechartering of the defendants’ respective chapters ... [T]o regain the ability to send delegates to the annual convention ... the members may remove the defendants from the presidency of their respective chapters, or (2) the members may amend their governing documents to legally appropriate the power to petition CCR away from the president and to some other member of their chapter as they see fit.

However, dissatisfaction with Rowlands led to another contested election in 2019. Kimo Gandall, backed by Rowlands, and Matt Ronnau each built slates of candidates and announced their intention to run for the CCR Executive Board. Prior to the 2019 election, Ronnau and his slate dropped out of the race and led a push for 10 clubs to decharter, or disassociate, from CCR instead of attending and running in the election. In the press release announcing the mass decharter, the clubs charged that CCR was "Failing to address ... repeated concerns," yet the clubs in question did not appear at the election or introduce legislation to amend CCR's constitution. Gandall was elected chairman.

Most of the 10 clubs that left formed a splinter group that was regarded as "an establishment GOP group that broke away from the more pro-Trump California College Republicans in 2019." CCR, meanwhile, described themselves as "the 'Trump wing of the GOP'" — and continuing Rowlands' socially conservative legacy.

In 2022, CCR Chairman Dylan Martin began collaboration with then-new splinter group leader David Chan to unify CCR once again. Chan had not been around during the initial split, so was highly in favor of unification. The two reached an agreement to hold a unity election in Las Vegas on June 24, 2023. Chan was elected chairman of the merged organization, and he proceeded to appoint Dylan Martin as Executive Director. The name of the merged organization was voted on by convention delegates, with "California College Republicans" winning with 59% of the vote. Corrin Rankin, Vice Chairwoman of the California Republican Party, attended the unity election and congratulated Chan and Martin on unity, saying:

The College Republicans have voted to unify and their official name is California College Republicans. Ensuring Republicans have a presence on college campuses is necessary to grow our party amongst young voters. I was honored to witness the unity today at their convention in Las Vegas. Congratulations to David Chan on being unanimously elected Chairman.

Chan is notable for serving concurrently as Chairman of the Alameda County Republican Party at just 20 years old.

Martin and Chan trademarked the name "College Republicans" in 2024.

== National Federation ==
=== The College Republican National Committee (CRNC) [1963-2019] ===
The California College Republicans ceased affiliation with the College Republican National Committee (CRNC) in 2019. According to a press release from CCR, the splinter group that had broken off during Rowlands's administration had petitioned the CRNC to revoke CCR's charter. The statement reads:

On Saturday, July 13th, despite Gandall agreeing to many of the terms for mediation, the CRNC ruled that CCR was to be “dechartered." ... Gandall strongly objected ... but his appeals were rejected without reason. “Despite my objections in Committee under my right to a point of order, the arbitrator illegally ... [removed] the charter. But this isn’t allowed in the Bylaws,” said Kimo Gandall, Chairman of the California College Republicans. “CRNC has a secret constitution that is not public,” continued Gandall, “and once I leaked it, I found that there were deep discrepancies. §2(5)(b)

CCR is not the only organization that is independent from the CRNC. In 2021, the CRNC controversially stripped the voting rights of several state federations that backed the election of Judah Waxelbaum over Courtney Britt for CRNC Chairman. Among those disqualified were Texas, New York, Mississippi, North Dakota, and Puerto Rico, who all voted to secede following Britt's election. The action's of the CRNC earned condemnation and words of support for the allegedly disenfranchised states from the New York, Connecticut, Arizona, and Arkansas Republican parties, as well as from Elise Stefanik, George P. Bush, John Boozman, and more. After losing its national charter, the California Republican Party used this as justification for stripping CCR's permanent charter with the state party. According to CCR:

The California Republican Party used CCR losing its recognition by the CRNC as justification for removing CCR’s permanent charter with the Party in 2019, and Party officials have encouraged CCR to rejoin the CRNC in the years following this move as a potential condition to regain a permanent charter.

A permanent charter status with the CAGOP had allowed CCR to file less annual charter paperwork and granted the group an extra party delegate. CCR maintains a temporary or "regular" charter with the CAGOP, but by losing the "permanent charter," the party effectively stripped a delegate from the College Republicans.

CCR says the reason the party gave for stripping its charter was to encourage CCR and the splinter group to reunify, and that the permanent charter would be returned as soon as they unified. But, even after reunifying in early 2023, the Party has not returned the permanent charter as of July 2024. CCR has said of the situation that "Party officials told CCR at its annual convention in May that it has no plans to return CCR’s permanent charter for as much as another 8 years or more — expressing concern CCR was not part of the CRNC."

=== College Republicans United (CRU) [2021-2023] ===
Now without a national organization, CCR continued to operate for two years independently. However, the California Republican Party pressured CCR to rejoin a national organization, and without the CRNC, the only alternative at the time was a new national College Republican organization that was beginning to form, College Republicans United (CRU).

Joining CRU with the goal of appeasing the CAGOP, CCR quickly found CRU to be riddled with scandal and poor leadership — and CCR unanimously voted to decharter, distance themselves, and become independent again in 2023.

=== The College Republicans of America (CRA) [2023-present] ===
Still under pressure from the California Republican Party to join a national organization and seeing the collapse of the CRNC, CCR members opted to help found the College Republicans of America (CRA) as a new national organization for College Republicans. According to the CRA themselves, "CRA is a PAC founded in 2023 by former leaders of the California College Republicans (CCR) and the Wisconsin College Republicans (WICR)."

As of July 2024, CRA oversees over 100 chapters and has recruited "over 1,500 new freshmen across 21 different states."

== Activities ==
CCR is primarily known for managing statewide get-out-the-vote efforts among its chapters, as well as its campus activism. At other times, CCR endorses candidates for office, pushes issue advocacy and lobbying efforts, hosts conservative guest speakers, and organizes social events and other recruitment activities.

Chapters traditionally table on campus for recruitment. Members use door-to-door canvassing, phonebanking, and word of mouth to identify and register Republican voters.

CCR, in particular, has been notable for its controversial campus activism events, including Affirmative action bake sales, pro-Trump chalking, and hosting provocative speakers like Rep. Paul Gosar.

== Governing structure ==
=== State organization ===
The leadership team of CCR makes up the state executive board, which includes a state chairperson and other officers as well as any subcommittees. The Board serves as the primary link between local university chapters and the California Republican Party. The state chairman, Committeeman, and Communications Director serve as representatives for CCR when dealing with the Republican Party and local media. The Chairman and Treasurer serve as representatives with state filings and governmental entities.

Chapters that make up the state organization are divided into regions across California, of which there are eight. Each region is managed by a Regional Chair that is part of the executive board. The regions as of 2021 are:

1. Northern. Amador, Alpine, Lake, Colusa, Sutter, Yuba, Nevada, Sierra, Glenn, Butte, Plumas, Tehama, Lassen, Shasta, Modoc, Mendocino, Del Norte, Siskiyou, Humboldt, and Trinity Counties.
2. Capitol. Yolo, Sacramento, Placer, El Dorado, San Joaquín, and Solano counties.
3. Bay Area. Sonoma, Napa, San Francisco, Marin, Contra Costa, Alameda, San Mateo, Santa Cruz, and Santa Clara counties.
4. Central Coast. San Benito, Monterey, Santa Barbara, San Luis Obispo, Ventura counties. Malibu city.
5. Central Valley. Kern, Kings, Tulare, Inyo, Fresno, Madera, Merced, Stanislaus, Tuolumne, Mono, Mariposa, and Calaveras Counties
6. Southern. San Bernardino, Orange, and Riverside counties.
7. Los Angeles. Los Angeles County.
8. San Diego. San Diego and Imperial counties.

CCR assists local chapters in each region with securing proper credentials, recruitment efforts, and canvassing and other get-out-the-vote (GOTV) efforts. They also provide chapters with tabling materials, legal resources, and other help as needed. CCR also organizes activities and deployments for the California Republican Party and statewide campaigns. The group is registered as a non-profit political action committee (PAC).

=== Campus chapters ===
The college and university-based chapters of CCR operate in a dual capacity as student clubs associated with their campus, as well as members of the state federation. Like CCR, the campus chapters are also affiliated with the local Republican Party. The chapter chairperson and leadership team are responsible for maintaining the campus club's registration, charter with CCR, and constitution. They also represent the club when dealing with CCR, the university administration, other student groups, and in the surrounding community. A chapter leadership team might include many members; commonly found are a president and vice president (chairman and vice chairman), a treasurer, a secretary, and a social media director.

Clubs associate with, or charter, with CCR by sending the state leadership their constitution, executive board members, a membership list, and proof of school recognition. Charters are permanent and may only be dissolved by a petition to and vote of the CCR Board of Directors, an annual meeting of all CCR chapter presidents.

== Elections and conventions ==
=== Annual convention and elections ===
State leadership is elected at a yearly convention — one of two major meetings of the California College Republicans each year (the other is a training session). The convention, simply known as "Convention," is the annual meeting for delegates from all CCR chapters to run for office, pass legislation, amend the Constitution (bylaws), hear from party leadership, and network. The convention generally took place between February and May each year before 2020, in congruence with the Spring Convention of the California Republican Party. Due to the COVID-19 pandemic, the 2020 convention of the California College Republicans was delayed until July 11, 2021. This reorganized the timing of the convention to now take place during the summer, usually in June in Las Vegas, Nevada.

=== Training meeting ===
State leadership convenes one or more training meetings each year. The meetings are of chapter presidents and any other members that wish to attend. Topics covered include issues like fundraising, networking, social media development, and more. The meeting is typically held at the same time as the California Republican Party conventions.

== State leadership ==
As of the 2026 Convention, the CCR Executive Board consists of:

Office	Name	Term
Chairman	Colson Thomas	2026-
Vice-Chairman	Andres Barillas	2026-
National Committeeman	Joshua Hadley	2026-
Executive Director	Dylan Martin	2022-
Membership Director	David Chan	2024-
Secretary	Matthew Canchola	2026-
At-Large Rep	Miguel Muñiz	2024-
Northern Representative	Vacant	
Bay Area Representative	Jose Martinez	2026-
Communications Director	Dylan Wakayama	2025-
Central Coast Representative	Nathan Bates	2026-
Central Valley Representative	Vacant	
Los Angeles Representative	Ava Schmidt	2026-
Southern Representative	Cooper Vincik	2026-
San Diego Representative	Kai Peters	2026-
Alumni Rep	Zack Dell	2026-
Alumni Rep	Richard Cordero	2026-
Alumni Rep	Josh Medeiros	2026-
Alumni Rep	Shelton King Jr.	2026-
Advisor	Paula Prizio	2017-

== Chairmen of the California College Republicans ==
The Chairman of CCR is tasked with serving as a primary representative of CCR, setting the agenda, appointing vacancies of the executive board, fundraising, maintaining legal filings, serving as a California Republican Party delegate, and ensuring the annual convention and Board of Directors meetings occur — as well as any other duties that may arise.

66th Chairman of the California College Republicans
- Incumbent; Colson Thomas since June 20, 2026
- Board of Directors
- Style: Mr. Chairman
- Type: Chairman
- Member of: California Republican Party
- Appointer: House of Delegates
- Term length: Approximately one year, renewable
- Constituting instrument: Bylaws of the California College Republicans
- Formation: August 29, 1963 (63 years ago)
- First holder: Randolph Siefkin
- Succession: Next in line is Vice-chairman
- Website: cacollegegop.org

Term	Chairman	#	Vice-chairman
1963-1964	Randolph "Randy" Siefkin	1	
1964-1965	William Dillon	2	
1965	David "Dave" Jackson	3	
1965-1966	Grace Jordan (1)	4	
1966-1967	Larry Burgess	5	
1967-1968	Richard Rashman	6	
1968-1969	Jim Gilam	7	Roy Gabriel
1969-1970	Michael Khul	8	
1970-?	James G. McKinney	9	
?-1971	Richard Ryckoff	10	
1971-1972	Frank J. Crosetti	11	
1972-1973	Jim Straw	12	
1973-1974	David C. Lorenzen	13	
1974-1975	William "Bill" Dohr	14	
1975-1976	Frank Harding	15	
1976-1977	Kyle Smith	16	
1977-1978	Audrey Merkin	17	
1978-1979	Britta Zwald	18	
1979-1980	Hunt Braly	19	
1980-1981	Unknown	20	
1981-1982	Unknown	21	
1982-1983	Shawn C. Moore	22	
1983	Lori Cummings	23	
1983-1984	Timothy McCormick (né Beer)	24	
1984-1985	Chet Beiler	25	
1985-1986	Scott Adamson	26	
1986-1987	Jim Arnone	27	
1987-1988	Fred Whitaker (2)	28	
1987-1988	Jim Michalski (2)**	29	
1988-1989	Jim Michalski (2)**	29	
1989-1990	Jim Michalski (2)**	29	
1990-1991	Thomas Hudson	30	
1991-1992	Jonathan Gear	31	
1992-1993	Sean Allen	32	
1993-1994	William Pedranti	33	
1994-1995	Ted Soojian	34	
1995-1996	Rezwan Pavri	35	
1996-1997	Charles Smith	36	
1997-1998	Jason Steele	37	
1998-1999	MacLane Key	38	
1999-2000	Patrick Isherwood	39	
2000-2001	Mike Sannella	40	
2001-2002	Erik W. Caldwell	41	
2002-2003	Erik W. Caldwell	41	
2003-2004	Michael P. Davidson	42	
2004-2005	Michael P. Davidson	42	
2005-2006	Stephen J. Puetz	43	
2006-2007	Mason J. Harrison	44	
2007-2008	Ryan M. Clumpner (3)	45	
2008-2009	Cheyenne Steel (4)	46	
2009-2010	Michael Antonopoulos	47	
2010-2011	Michael Antonopoulos	47	
2011-2012	Clinton Soffer	48	
2012-2013	Matthew Donnellan	49	
2013-2014	Nithin Matthew	50	
2014-2015	Shawn Lewis	51	
2015-2016	Jere Ford	52	
2016-2017	Ivy Allen	53	Leesa Danzek
2017	Leesa Danzek (5)	54	Nick Steinwender
2017-2018	Ariana Rowlands	55	Christian Chacon
2018-2019	Ariana Rowlands	55	Andrew Gates Kimo Gandall
2019-2020	Kimo Gandall	56	Hannah Stanford
2020-2021	Nicholas "Nick" Ortiz (6)	57	Arielle Spotswood
2021-2022	William "Will" Donahue (7)	58	Stephen Sills
2022	Nathan "Nate" Bymel**	59	Stephen Sills and Beto Mendez
2022-2023	Dylan Martin	60	Stephen Sills, Beto Mendez, Nancy Barragan, Mikaela Adams
2023	Nathan "Nate" Bymel**	61	Mikaela Adams
2023	David Chan (8)	62	Mikaela Adams
2023-2024	David Chan (8)	62	Mark Basta
2024-2025	Martin Bertao (9)	63	Mackenzie Hoie
2025	Aaron Tran	64	Miguel Muñiz
2025-2026	Miguel Muñiz	65	Josh Medeiros
2026-	Colson Thomas	66	Andres Barillas

Note: Red coloring denotes Trump-supporting era Chairmen. Blue denotes Chairmen that later became Democrats.

1. Grace Jordan was CCR's first female and first black chairwoman.
2. Jim Michalski and Fred Whitaker were both Chairmen of competing wings of CCR between 1987 and 1988. Michalski won the 1988 rematch unity election.
3. Ryan Clumpner later left the Republican Party.
4. Cheyenne Steel is the daughter of RNC Committeeman Shawn Steel and former Congresswoman Michelle Steel.
5. Leesa Danzek went on to become a Democrat operative in South Carolina. She was later censured by CCR and stripped of honorary titles.
6. Nick Ortiz was the first openly gay chairman of CCR.
7. Will Donahue went on to found College Republicans of America.
8. David Chan was the first chairman to serve concurrently as chairman of a county Republican party. Chan served as chair of Alameda County, where he was the youngest-known county chairman in California Republican Party history.
9. Immediately after leaving office, Martin Bertao took over as President of the national College Republicans of America, succeeding former CCR Chairman Will Donahue.

**There have been seven chairmen of CCR to serve a second distinct term. But one chair, Jim Michalski, served three terms. And another, Nate Bymel, served two terms non-consecutively.

== Committeemen of the California College Republicans ==
The Committeeman of the California College Republicans is a role that has changed over time. From 1967 to 1969, the role served as a representative to the College Republican National Committee (CRNC). The role was then merged with the position of chairman. In 2021, the role of Committeeman was reestablished to serve as a representative of CCR with newly CRNC-independent state federations, the national College Republican groups, and the California Republican Party. For a period of time, there were two committeemen at once, but the role was narrowed back down into a single position in 2023.

The current Committeeman is Joshua Hadley elected in June 2026.

National Committeemen of the California College Republicans
- Incumbent; Joshua Hadley
- Executive Board
- Style: Mr. Committeeman
- Type: Committeeman
- Member of: California Republican Party
- Appointer: House of Delegates
- Term length: Approximately one year, renewable
- Constituting instrument: Bylaws of the California College Republicans
- Formation: March 19, 1967 (59 years ago)
- First holder: Vic Saraydarian
- Website: cacollegegop.com

Term	Committeeman	#
1967-1968	Vic Saraydarian	1
1967-1968	Nancy Burt	2
1968-1969	William "Bill" Hawkins	3
1968-1969	Carolyn Ziegler	4
2021-2023	Dylan Martin (1)	5
2022-2023	Will Donahue (2)	6
2023-2023	Stephen Sills	7
2023	Utkarsh Jain	8
2023-2024	William B. Thompson VI (3)	9
2024	Brice Lang (4)	10
2024	Samuel Delk	11
2024-2025	Ahmed AlBadrani	12
2025-2026	Hitesh Kamisetty	13
2026-	Joshua Hadley	14

(1) Dylan Martin was the first openly gay Committeeman of CCR and was the first to serve as both Committeeman and Chairman of CCR.

(2) Will Donahue went on to found the College Republicans of America during his tenure as Committeeman. Donahue resigned in order to lead CRA.

(3) William B. Thompson VI resigned and was replaced by Brice Lang.

(4) Brice Lang resigned and was replaced by Samuel Delk.

=== Involvement in the Split of the College Republican National Committee (CRNC) ===
The position of Committeeman was reformed to help manage relationships with, partly, other state federations after their declarations of independence from the College Republican National Committee (CRNC) in 2021.

Committeeman Martin helped successfully broker a partnership with the College Republicans United and CCR, which gave the organization its first national College Republican allies following CCR's independence from the CRNC in 2019. Dissatisfaction with CRU led to Martin, Chairman Will Donahue, and others to found College Republicans of America.

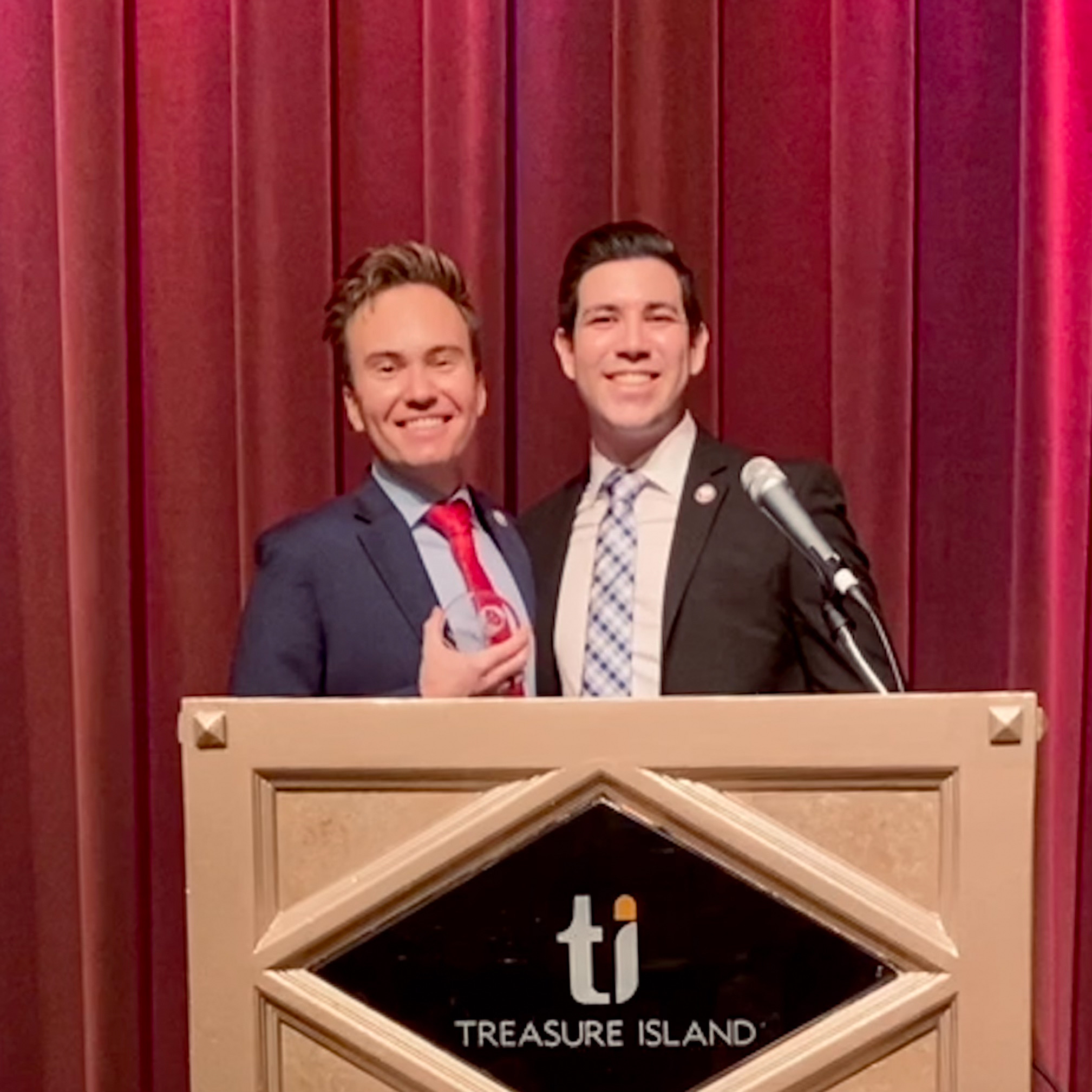
Chairman Nick Ortiz Presents Committeeman Martin with MVP Award

== Notable alumni ==
- Shawn Steel, Republican National Committeeman from California and former Chairman of the California Republican Party
- Pete Wilson, 36th Governor of California
- Kevin Kiley, California State Assemblyman
- Ben Shapiro, political commentator
- Kevin McCarthy, Congressman and House Republican Leader (CA-23)
- Fred Whitaker, Chairman of the Republican Party of Orange County
- Panagiotis Frousiakis, Candidate for Huntington Beach City Council 2022
- Dana Rohrabacher, former Congressman (CA-48)
- Ed Royce, former Congressman (CA-39)
- Matthew Harper, former California State Assemblyman
- John Rice-Cameron, son of Democratic National Security Advisor Susan Rice

== See also ==
- California Republican Party
- Republican National Committee
- Young Republicans
- Teenage Republicans
- The New York Young Republican Club
