= Morton Blackwell =

American political activist

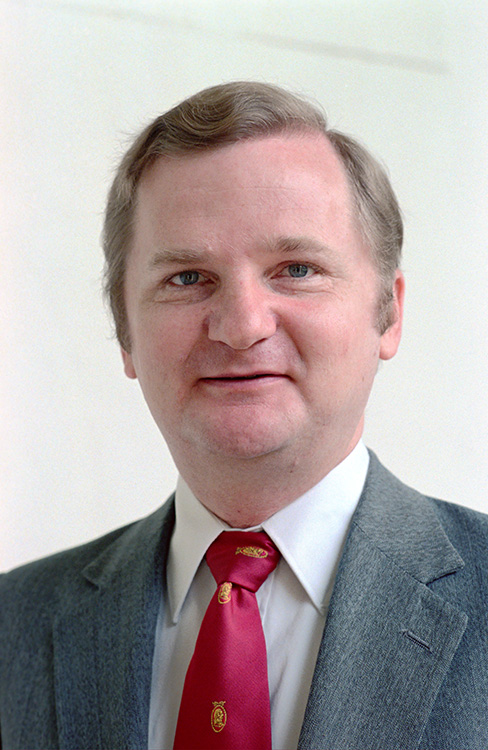
- Blackwell in 1982

Republican National Committeeman from Virginia
- Incumbent
- Assumed office August 1988
- Preceded by: William Stanhagen

Personal details
- Born: November 16, 1939 (age 86) La Jara, Colorado, U.S.
- Education: Louisiana State University
- Occupation: Activist

Morton C. Blackwell (born November 16, 1939, La Jara, Colorado) is an American conservative activist. He is the founder and president of the Leadership Institute (established 1979), a 501(c)(3) non-profit educational foundation that teaches political technology to conservative activists. He currently serves as Virginia's national committeeman on the Republican National Committee.

== Biography ==
In youth politics, Blackwell was a College Republican state chairman and a Young Republican state chairman in Baton Rouge, Louisiana. He served on the Young Republican National Committee for more than 12 years. He rose to the position of national vice chairman at-large of the Young Republican National Federation.

Off and on for five and half years, 1965 to 1970, he worked as executive director of the College Republican National Committee under four consecutive College Republican national chairmen. For eight years, he was a member of the Louisiana Republican State Central Committee.

Blackwell worked for seven years under conservative Richard Viguerie.

Blackwell was first elected to the Arlington County, Virginia Republican Committee in 1972. He is a member of the Republican Party of Virginia's State Central Committee.

In 1988, Blackwell was elected as Virginia's Republican National Committeeman, and was re-elected in 1992, 1996, 2000, 2004, 2008, 2012, and 2016.

In 2004, Blackwell was elected to the executive committee of the RNC.

He was married to Helen Blackwell (née Reddy) for 47 years until her death in 2019.

== Political activities ==
Blackwell was Barry Goldwater’s youngest elected delegate to the 1964 Republican National Convention in San Francisco. His Louisiana delegation was headed by gubernatorial candidate Charlton Lyons of Shreveport, Louisiana. In the spring of 1966, he worked for the election of the late Roderick Miller of Lafayette, Louisiana as only the third Republican member of the Louisiana House of Representatives since Reconstruction.

He was a national convention alternate delegate for Ronald W. Reagan in 1968 and 1976, and a Ronald Reagan delegate at the 1980 Republican National Convention. In 1980, he organized and oversaw the national youth effort for Reagan. From 1981 to 1984, Blackwell was a special assistant to President Reagan.

Blackwell was at the center of controversy during the 2004 Republican National Convention, when he passed out Purple Heart bandages which were perceived by some as denigrating the award. The Kerry campaign attacked the activity as the Republican Party mocking United States soldiers. Karl Rove called Blackwell's bandages "inappropriate".

Blackwell is considered something of a specialist in matters relating to the rules of the Republican Party. He served on rules committees of the state Republican parties in Louisiana and Virginia. He serves now on the Standing Committee on Rules of the Republican National Committee and has attended every meeting of the RNC rules committees since 1972.

In the 2016 Republican Party presidential primaries Blackwell endorsed Ted Cruz.

Blackwell is also the founder and president of the Leadership Institute, a non-profit conservative organization based in Arlington, VA.

== Sources ==
- Byron York, The Vast Left Wing Conspiracy (New York, Crown Forum, 2005), pp. 233–34
