= Campus Reform =

US conservative news website

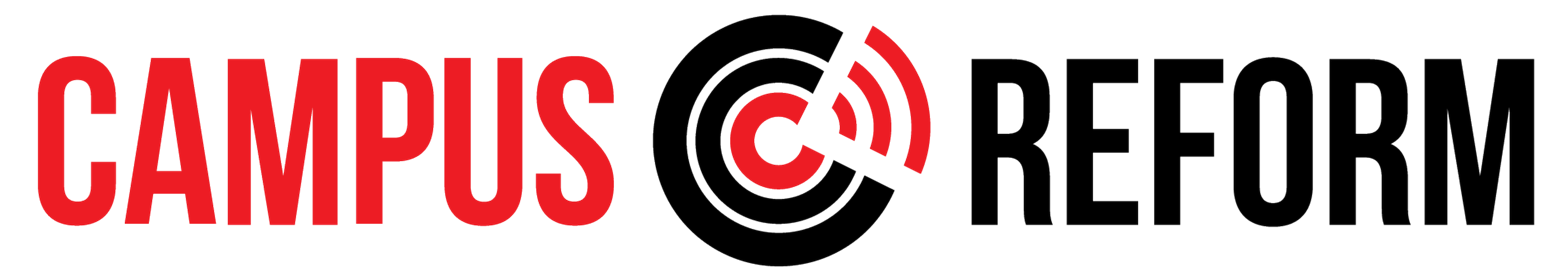

- Campus Reform homepage in April 2017
- Type: Online publication
- Format: Online
- Owner: Leadership Institute
- President: Morton Blackwell
- Editor-in-chief: Celine Ryan Ciccio
- Founded: 2009
- Headquarters: Arlington, Virginia
- Website: campusreform.org

Campus Reform is an American conservative news website focused on higher education. It is operated by the Leadership Institute. It uses students as reporters. The news site is known for conservative journalism, where it reports incidents of liberal bias and restrictions on free speech on American college campuses. The online publication maintains running list of "victories"—ranging from college policy changes to firings—on a dry-erase board at the website's Arlington, Virginia, headquarters inside the Leadership Institute.

In September 2015, Campus Reform said its website had received 9.3 million page views in the past year.

== Notable stories ==
In May 2012, Campus Reform called on conservative students to protest liberal speakers on campus such as Supreme Court justice Sonia Sotomayor.

In September 2015, Campus Reform was first to report that David W. Guth, a University of Kansas associate professor of journalism, had tweeted: "The blood is on the hands of the #NRA. Next time let it be YOUR sons and daughters", in reaction to the Washington Navy Yard shooting days before. The university was deluged by complaints, and the university put Guth on temporary leave with pay.

In June 2017, a Campus Reform story headlined "Prof: 'white marble' in artwork contributes to white supremacy" reported on comments by University of Iowa classics professor Sarah Bond writing an article about white marble statues that read in part: "really sick of alt-right groups appropriating classical antiquities for nefarious reasons." Other conservative outlets such as Heat Street and National Review began citing that Campus Reform story, and Bond began receiving death threats within days.

== See also ==
- The College Fix
