= SFPA =

SFPA may stand for

- San Francisco Parks Alliance
- Science Fiction Poetry Association
- Scottish Fisheries Protection Agency
- Student Free Press Association
- Saint Francis University, located in Pennsylvania; abbreviation used to distinguish it from Saint Francis College, located in New York.
