= Penn State College Republicans =

College Republican Chapter

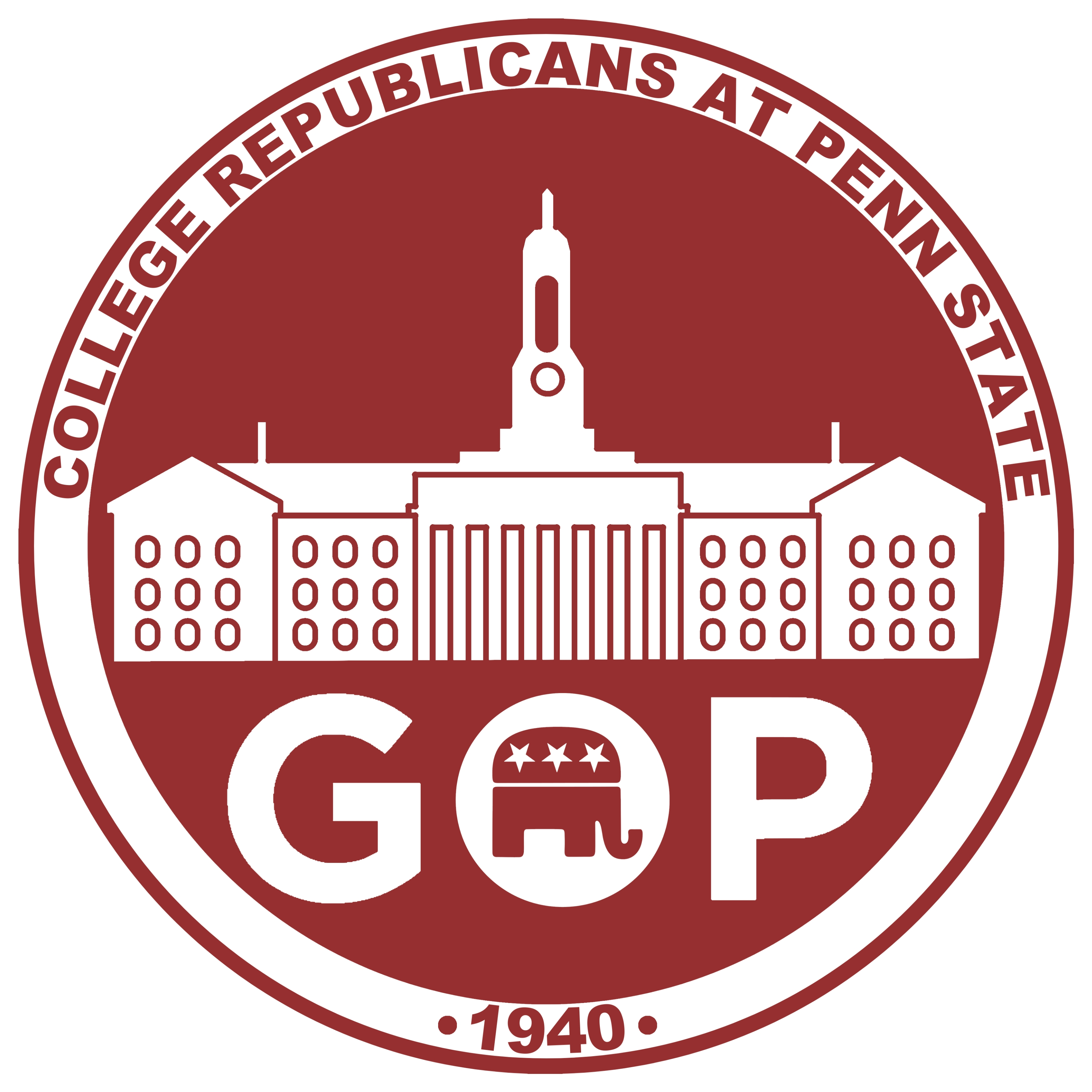
- President: Tristin Kilgore
- Vice President: Madeleine MacKenzie
- Founded: 1940; 86 years ago
- Headquarters: State College, PA
- Mother party: Republican Party
- State party: Pennsylvania Republican Party
- Website: https://psucollegerepublicans.org

The Penn State College Republicans (PSU GOP) is a chapter of the College Republicans at the Pennsylvania State University. The purpose of Penn State College Republicans is to assist in the election of Republican candidates to local, state, and national office, promote conservative ideals and principles at the Pennsylvania State University, engage in community service.

The PSU GOP is open to both undergraduate and graduate students at Penn State University Park. They are an official registered student organization with the University. Their self-stated mission is to "provide a platform for conservative students to connect, discuss, and advocate for their beliefs."

== History ==
=== Founding ===
The PSU GOP was founded in 1940. The organization was not officially registered with the University as Penn State did not keep records of student organizations until the 1970s.

=== Reestablishment ===
After the Watergate Scandal and resignation of President Richard Nixon, the Penn State College Republicans dissolved. For three years, there were no College Republicans on campus at Penn State University Park. During his freshman year, Rick Santorum became involved with Republican politics by working on various political campaigns. This led him to reestablish the Penn State College Republicans in 1977.

The club existed without official recognition from Penn State until December 12th, 1979. Since this date, there has been no lapse in its recognition and existence at Penn State, maintaining a minimum of ten undergraduate, active members.

=== Affiliation ===
==== National ====
When the Penn State College Republicans was established in 1940, it chartered with the College Republican National Committee (CRNC). This remained to be the case until June 16th, 2024, when the Pennsylvania Federation of College Republicans (PAFCR) left the CRNC to join the National Federation of College Republicans (NFCR). The CRNC controversially stripped the voting rights of several state federations that backed the election of Judah Waxelbaum over Courtney Britt for CRNC Chairman. Among those disqualified were Texas, New York, Mississippi, North Dakota, and Puerto Rico, who all voted to secede following Britt's election. This drove the Penn State College Republicans to join with the rest of the PAFCR to leave the CRNC.

Membership in the National Federation of College Republicans was short lived, however. After the 2024 election season had concluded, the PAFCR voted to officially leave the NFCR and join the College Republicans of America (CRA). This was caused by the alleged infighting and weak leadership of the Chairwoman Rachel Howard of NFCR, with PAFCR stating that they do "not wish to waste time in political battles between various College Republican organizations... only the CRA has placed the success of the Republican Party and our candidates over this type of infighting." Acting President of the CRA at the time, Gabriel Guidarini, commented on the move, stating "It was a pleasure to work with them extensively during the election cycle, and we are proud to have them join us today." The Penn State College Republicans applauded this decision and moved forward with a charter under the College Republicans of America with the rest of Pennsylvania.

==== State ====
In their Constitution, the Penn State College Republicans maintains "a working relationship with the Pennsylvania State Federation of College Republicans so long as it exists."

== Leadership ==
=== Executive Board ===
The Executive Board of the Penn State College Republicans is elected yearly at the end of the Spring Semester. All active members of the organization are eligible to run for and vote for the elected positions. The only position on the Executive Board that is not elected is the Chief of Staff, who also does not have a vote on the Executive Board. This position is appointed by the President at the beginning of the Fall Semester and is traditionally held by a First-Year Student.

==== Current Executive Board ====
- Tristin Kilgore, President
- Madeleine MacKenzie, Vice President
- Emma Smorgonsky, Treasurer
- Neve McAllister, Secretary
- Ryan Reichel, Director of Special Events
- Pierce Hayostek, Chief of Staff

=== Cabinet ===
In addition to the Executive Board, the PSU GOP maintains a number of positions appointed by the President and confirmed by the Executive Board to aid with the management of the organizations. These Cabinet Directors include, but are not limited to, Political Director, Communications Director, Fundraising Director, and Press Secretary.

==== Current Cabinet ====
- Jed Jallorina, Executive Director
- Mia Humphreys, Special Advisor to the President
- Luca Boley, Political Director
- Ellery Monnin, Communications Director
- Jameson Barker, Press Secretary
- Henry Betman, Fundraising Director
- David Washabaugh VI, Parliamentarian
- Alex Kreitz, Program Manager
- Donovan Hunter, Outreach Director
- Katie Felmlee, Engagement Director

=== List of Presidents ===
Name	Term	# of Terms	Class	School
Tristin Kilgore	2025-Present	2	2027	Liberal Arts
Ryan Klein	2023-2025	2	2025	Liberal Arts & Schreyer
Matt Soska	2022-23	1	2023	Liberal Arts & Schreyer
Morgan (Watt) Clark	2021-22	1	2022	Agricultural Sciences
Jordan Clark	2020-21	1	2021 & 2022	Bellisario & Smeal
Max Myers	2019-20	1	2020	Liberal Arts
Reagan McCarthy	2018-19	1	2019	Liberal Arts
Grant Worley	2017-18	1	2018	Engineering
Michael Straw	2016-17	1	2017	Liberal Arts
Brad Simmons	Spring 2016	0.5	2016	Liberal Arts
Darian (Gist) David	2015-16	1.5	2016	Education
Brandon Matsnev	2014-15	1	2015	Liberal Arts
Jordan Harris	2012-14	2	2014	
Josh Crawford	2010-12	2	2012	Liberal Arts
David Frantz	Spring 2010	0.5	2010	Liberal Arts
Alex Smith	2008-09	1		
Brandon Means	2007-08	1		
Todd Taylor	2006-07	1		
Seth Bender	Fall 2006	0.5		
Andy Banducci	2004-06	2	2006	
Rich Pastena	Spring 2004	0.5		
Brian Battaglia	Fall 2003	0.5	2004	
Chris Miller	2002-03	1	2004	
Mike Gallo	2001-02	1	2003	
T.J. Kokolis	2000-01	1	2002	
Melissa Kowalski	1999-2000	1	2001	
Eric Deitrick	Fall 1998	0.5		
Jerrold Ansman	1996-98	2	1999	
Mike Owens	1995-96	1		
Steve Brame	1994-95	1	1996	
William Enscore	1993-94	1		
Tricia Giannini	1992-93	1		
Lance O'Donnell	1991-92	1		
Mary Miles	1990-91	1	1993	
John Souren	1989-90	1	1990	
Jim Hamilton	1988-89	1		
Christopher Woronchuk	1987-88	1		
Unknown	1986-87	1		
Maria Benecki	1985-86	1	1986	
Rich Forgette	1984-85	1		
Michael O'Connell	Spring 1984	0.5	1986	
Bernie Hughs	1983-84	1		
Donald McClure	1982-83	1	1983	
Suzanne Harbolis	1981-82	1		
Jeffery Sundheim	1980-81	1		
Jane Kapp	1979-80	1		
David Winkler	1978-79	1		
Rick Santorum	1977-78	1	1980	Liberal Arts
Defunct from 1974-1977
Clyde Sheehan	1973-74	1		
Jan Levenberg	1972-73	1		
Bruce Lingenfelter	1971-72	1		
Benjamin Sinclair	1952-53	1	1954	
Vincent Yakowicz	Spring 1952	0.5		

== Activities ==
=== Elections ===
PSU GOP is primarily known for managing local and statewide get-out-the-vote efforts, as well as its campus activism. The chapter traditionally tables use door-to-door canvassing, phone banking, and word of mouth to identify and register Republican voters.

Their efforts during the 2024 Presidential election showcased the height of their election activities. PSU GOP planned and carried out multiple College Republican deployments across Pennsylvania. Most notably was their deployment to Pittsburgh on behalf of President Trump, Dave McCormick, and Rob Mercuri. This brought together students from the Pennsylvania Federation of College Republicans, the Ohio College Republican Federation, the College Republicans of Virginia, and the District of Columbia College Republicans to turn out low propensity Republican voters. During this deployment, 16 College Republican chapters knocked on 2,500+ doors, setting a single day record during the election in Pennsylvania. Congressman Glenn "GT" Thompson commended this deployment as the "largest College Republican door knocking effort" during the election cycle. PSU GOP also helped to bring President Trump to Penn State's campus in the first visit from a major Presidential candidate since Barack Obama in 2008, which Congressman GT also recognized during his speech at the rally.

=== Pennsylvania Collegiate Leadership Conference ===
==== Overview ====
In 2024, the Penn State College Republicans launched the Pennsylvania Collegiate Leadership Conference (PCLC) as an annual initiative to introduce collegiate leader to the conservative principles of American government and to develop them into the future leaders. The Pennsylvania Collegiate Leadership Conference seeks to be an event for any individual that wants to learn more about these conservative principles. In 2026, PSU GOP, during the third annual PCLC, expanded the conference to become a two day event for first time ever.

==== Notable Speakers ====
- Glenn Thompson, Congressman (PA-15)
- Rob Bresnahan, Congressman (PA-08)
- Dan Meuser, Congressman (PA-09)
- Stacy Garrity, Pennsylvania Treasurer
- Timothy DeFoor, Pennsylvania Auditor General
- Dave Sunday, Pennsylvania Attorney General
- Fred Keller, Former Congressman (PA-12)
- Rick Santorum, former U.S. Senator (R-PA)
- Greg Rothman, PA State Senator and Chairman of PA GOP
- Cris Dush, PA State Senator
- Joe Picozzi, PA State Senator
- Jesse Topper, PA House Republican Leader
- Jake Corman, Former PA Senate President Pro-Tempore
- Mark Krikorian, Executive Director of the Center for Immigration Studies

== Endorsements ==
=== 2025 ===
For the 2025 Pennsylvania Elections, the Penn State College Republicans endorsed the slate of Republican judicial nominees. This included:

- Maria Battista for Judge of the Superior Court
- Matt Wolford for Judge of the Commonwealth Court

They, also, encouraged Pennsylvanians to vote No on retention for Pennsylvania Supreme Court Justices Christine Donohue, Kevin Dougherty, and David Wecht.

=== 2024 ===
During the 2024 Presidential election, the Penn State College Republicans made multiple endorsements. The earliest of which was for Dave McCormick for US Senate in October 2023, following his endorsement by PA GOP. The following year came the endorsement of Donald Trump on March 12, 2024, once he became the presumptive nominee with his victory in the Washington Primary election. The following day, PSU GOP endorsed multiple candidates:

- Glenn Thompson for Congress (PA-15)
- Tim DeFoor for PA Auditor General
- Dave Sunday for PA Attorney General
- Stacy Garrity for PA Treasurer
- Cris Dush for PA State Senate (SD-25)
- Wayne Langerholc for PA State Senate (SD-35)
- Marie Librizzi for PA State House (HD-77)
- Therese Hollen for PA State House (HD-82)
- Kerry Benninghoff for PA State House (HD-171)

After his selection as President Trump's Vice President, PSU GOP endorsed JD Vance for Vice President.

=== 2020 ===
One week before the 2020 Presidential election, the Penn State College Republicans issued a slate of endorsements. PSU GOP endorsed the following candidates:

- Donald Trump for President
- Fred Keller for Congress (PA-12)
- Heather Heidelbaugh for PA Attorney General
- Tim DeFoor for PA Auditor General
- Stacy Garrity for PA Treasurer
- Steve Yetsko for PA State House (HD-77)

=== 2016 ===
The Penn State College Republicans refrained from making endorsements during the 2016 Presidential election. Most notably, they publicly announced their opposition to the election of Donald Trump, the 2016 Republican Party nominee and eventual winner of the election, as the president of the United States. Along with 13 other College Republicans chapters who declined to endorse Trump or endorsed another candidate for President. This marked the first time in the organization's history that they did not endorse the Republican nominee for President.

== Notable members ==
- Rick Santorum, former U.S. Senator (R-PA) and former Presidential Candidate
- Vincent Yakowicz, former Pennsylvania Solicitor General and former Secretary of Revenue of Pennsylvania
- Donald McClure, Chairman of McClure Consulting and Perry County GOP Chairman
- Dr. David Winkler, Naval Historian and former US Navy Commander
