= William A. Steiger =

American politician

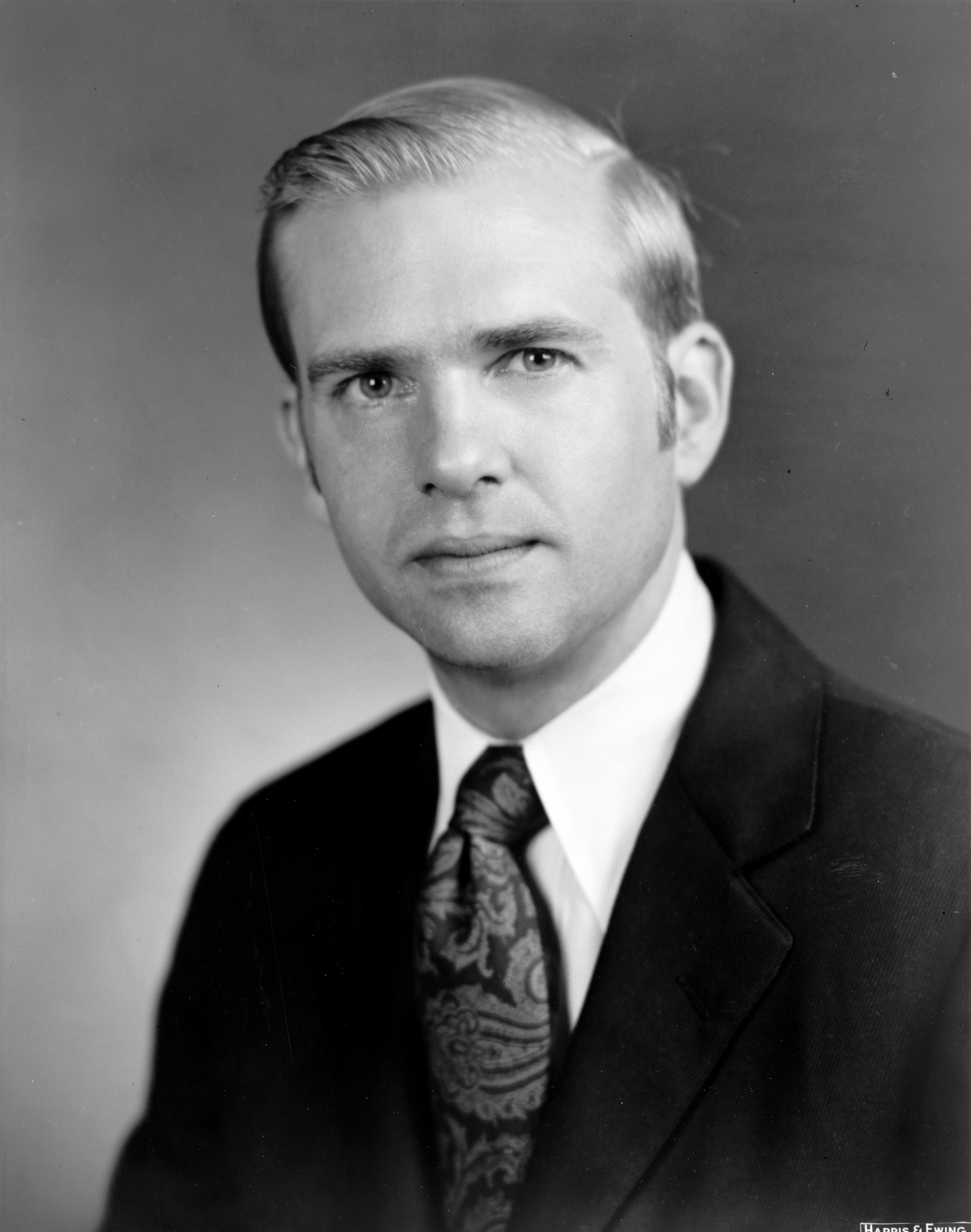

Member of the U.S. House of Representatives from Wisconsin's 6th district
- In office January 3, 1967 – December 4, 1978
- Preceded by: John A. Race
- Succeeded by: Tom Petri

Member of the Wisconsin State Assembly from the 1st Winnebago district
- In office January 2, 1961 – January 3, 1967
- Preceded by: Harvey R. Abraham
- Succeeded by: Jack D. Steinhilber

Chairman of the College Republican National Committee
- In office 1959–1961
- Preceded by: Dan Hofgren
- Succeeded by: Jim Harff

Personal details
- Born: William Albert Steiger; May 15, 1938 Oshkosh, Wisconsin, US
- Died: December 4, 1978 (aged 40) Washington D.C., US
- Party: Republican
- Spouse: Janet Dempsey (m. 1963)
- Children: William R. Steiger
- Education: University of Wisconsin, Madison (BS)

William Albert Steiger (May 15, 1938 – December 4, 1978) was a member of the U.S. House of Representatives from 1967 to his death from a heart attack in Washington, DC, in 1978. He served as a Republican from Wisconsin.

== Early life ==
Steiger was born in Oshkosh, Wisconsin. He attended the youth government and leadership program Badger Boys State in 1955 where he was elected Governor and then represented his state at Boys Nation. In 1960, he graduated from the University of Wisconsin–Madison.

=== Early career ===
After college, Steiger entered the business world, becoming a part owner of the Oshkosh Motor Lodge. Later, he became the president of Steiger-Ratke Development. In 1960, the young Steiger made his first run for elected office and became a member of the Wisconsin State Assembly from 1961 to 1965.

=== Marriage ===
His wife was Janet Dempsey Steiger; they were married on August 10, 1963.

== Congress ==
In 1966, Steiger was elected to the 90th Congress as the representative of Wisconsin's 6th congressional district. He was re-elected to the next six Congresses but died in office before the 96th Congress. Overall, he served from January 3, 1967, to December 4, 1978. His surprise death left a vacancy in the House that was filled by a special election that resulted in the election of Tom Petri.

In the House, Steiger was a strong supporter of tax cuts as a way to stimulate the economy. He sponsored legislation reducing the capital gains tax, establishing the Occupational Safety and Health Administration, and securing environmental protection for the Great Lakes. The bills that he authored on those topics included the Williams-Steiger Bill that established the OSHA in 1970, the Clear Lakes Bill that established environmental protection for the Great Lakes, the Older Americans Act of 1965, the Elementary and Secondary School Act, the Manpower Act, and the Steiger Amendment of 1978 that reduced the capital gains tax.

=== Staff ===
While he was a U.S. representative, he in 1969 employed the future Vice President Dick Cheney as an intern.

== Death ==
Steiger died from a heart attack in Washington, D.C., on December 4, 1978, aged 40.

== Legacy ==
The American Conference of Governmental Industrial Hygienists (ACGIH) annually hands out the William Steiger Memorial Award, which honors individuals from the social/political sphere whose efforts have contributed to advancements in occupational safety and health.

His son, William R. Steiger, worked for Governor Tommy Thompson of Wisconsin, and most recently as the Director of the Office of Global Health Affairs and Special Assistant to the Secretary for International Affairs, in the U.S. Dept. of Health and Human Services, where he has been the subject of controversy for his role in the politicization of science.

The congressman was honored in his hometown of Oshkosh with the naming of the William A. Steiger Park, which is located on the south shore of the Fox River, east and west of the Wisconsin Street Bridge.

== See also ==
- List of chairpersons of the College Republicans
- List of members of the United States Congress who died in office (1950–1999)

U.S. House of Representatives
Preceded by John A. Race	Member of the U.S. House of Representatives from Wisconsin's 6th congressional district 1967–1978	Succeeded by Tom Petri
Party political offices
Preceded by Everett Dirksen; Gerald Ford	Response to the State of the Union address 1968; Served alongside: Howard Baker, George H. W. Bush, Peter Dominick, Gerald Ford, Robert Griffin, Thomas Kuchel, Mel Laird, Bob Mathias, George Murphy, Dick Poff, Chuck Percy, Al Quie, Charlotte Reid, Hugh Scott, John Tower	Vacant Title next held by Donald Fraser, Scoop Jackson, Mike Mansfield, John McCormack, Patsy Mink, Ed Muskie, Bill Proxmire
