= John J. Miller (journalist) =

American author, journalist and educator

- Born: John Joseph Miller; 1970 (age 55–56); Detroit, Michigan, U.S.
- Education: University of Michigan
- Writing career
- Genre: Non-fiction

John Joseph Miller (born 1970) is an American journalist, author, and director of the journalism program at Hillsdale College. He has been the national political reporter at National Review and has written for The Wall Street Journal and other publications. He founded The College Fix, a conservative leaning higher education watchdog.

== Early life and education ==
Miller was born in Detroit, and raised in Michigan and Florida. He graduated from J. P. Taravella High School in 1988. Miller then attended the University of Michigan, where he was editor-in-chief of The Michigan Review, a conservative newspaper.

== Career ==
His first job was at The New Republic in Washington, D.C. After that, he worked for the Center for Equal Opportunity, then at The Heritage Foundation as a Bradley Fellow. He wrote for Reason and became a contributing editor there. In 1998, he joined National Review, where he continues to contribute to National Review Online.

Miller founded The College Fix, a conservative leaning higher education watchdog website funded by the nonprofit 501(c)(3) Student Free Press Association.

== Works ==
- The Unmaking Of Americans: How Multiculturalism has Undermined the Assimilation Ethic (1998, ISBN 0-684-83622-X)
- Our Oldest Enemy: A History of America's Disastrous Relationship with France (co-authored with Mark Molesky, 2004, ISBN 0-385-51219-8)
- A Gift of Freedom: How the John M. Olin Foundation Changed America (2005, ISBN 1-59403-117-7)
- The First Assassin: A Novel (2009, ISBN 1-935597-11-6)
- The Big Scrum: How Teddy Roosevelt Saved Football (2011, HarperCollins, ISBN 0-06-174450-6)
