= Chandler Thornton =

American political operative

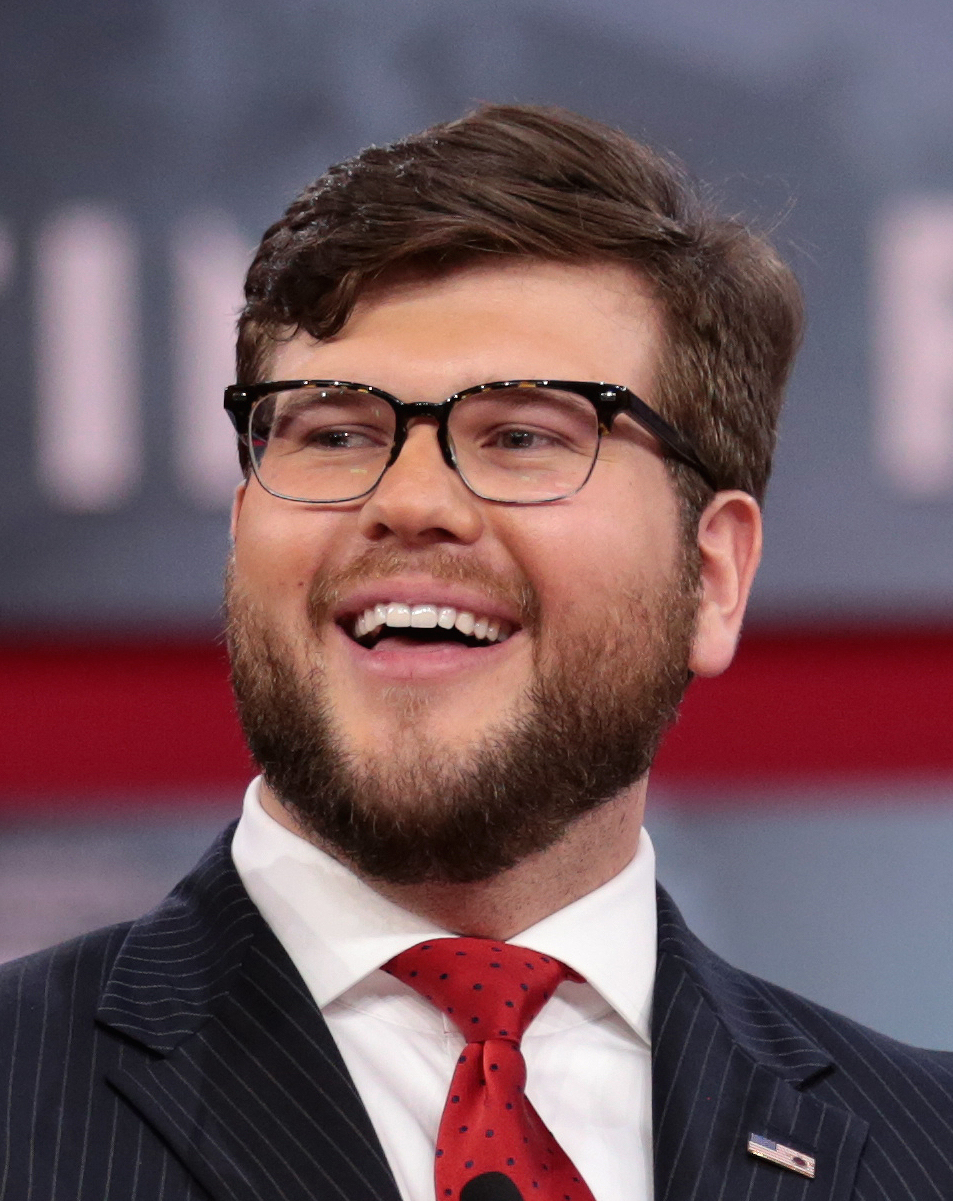

Chair of the College Republican National Committee
- In office 2017–2021
- Deputy: Tom Ferrall

Chair of the District of Columbia Federation of College Republicans
- In office 2014–2015

Personal details
- Born: Chandler Thornton Frederick, Maryland, U.S.
- Party: Republican
- Education: American University (BA, MPA)

Chandler Thornton is an American political operative best known as the former Chairman of the College Republican National Committee.

== Education ==
Chandler attended American University, earning his Bachelor of Arts in Political Science and his Master of Public Administration. He is a graduate of the Campaign Management Institute in Washington, D.C. and the European Public Affairs and Advocacy Institute in Brussels, Belgium. He was a George C. Marshall Fellow at The Heritage Foundation.

== Career ==
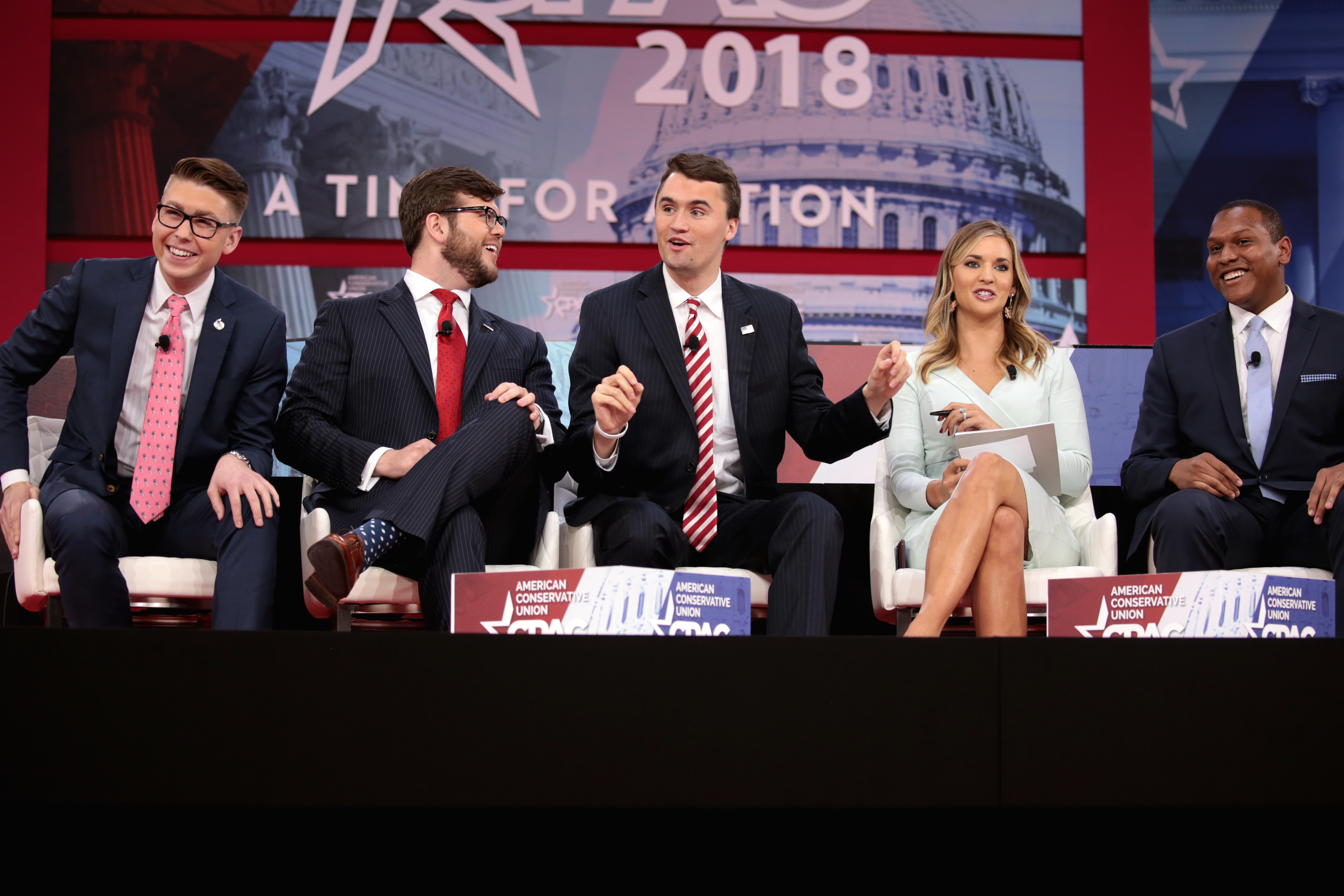
Thornton (second from left) at the 2018 Conservative Political Action Conference with YAF Chairman Grant Strobl, Turning Point USA Founder Charlie Kirk, Journalist Katie Pavlich, and Stephen Rowe from the Leadership Institute.

In 2016, after six years serving various conservative campaigns as an intern and working with regional college Republican groups, Thornton was named Northeast Regional Vice Chairman of the College Republicans.

In 2017, he was elected at the College Republican National Convention to chairman, a tenure which ended in 2021. Notably, during his last months in office, some College Republicans, including Ty Seymour who served as National Treasurer under Thornton, made accusations of corruption and meddling in the election of his successor.

He was featured on the 2016 Red Alert Politics “30 Under 30” list of young conservatives, the 2017 Maverick PAC “Future 40” list of young professionals, and the 2018 Newsmax “30 under 30” list of most influential Republicans.

== Controversy ==
In 2021, many State Federations considered secession from the College Republican National Committee (CRNC). College Republicans alleged that Thornton had unfairly influenced the voting process in the 2021 national executive committee elections to eliminate delegates who had pledged their support for Judah Waxelbaum, the opponent of Thornton's preferred candidate Courtney Britt.

Some states supporting Britt sent the final documentation that was required for credentialing by email July 11, 2021, all with the same or similar subject lines and body text, and all states supporting Waxelbaum failed to submit this required documentation. It was later discovered that Thornton directly contacted a chapter whose state supported Britt to ensure they were in compliance. Email correspondence between Thornton and Case Western University Professor Jonathan Adler showed that Thornton had taken an active role in ensuring that this chapter whose state pledged support to Britt would be in compliance with the rules. Following the appeals process, the arbitrator granted delegates to all the states supporting Britt who had appealed based on the fact that they had this necessary documentation, but denied almost all the states supporting Waxelbaum because they lacked it. Waxelbaum objected to the results of credentialing stating, "Currently, 20 percent of the CRNC cannot vote, that’s not even including the states that didn’t get votes and didn’t appeal for votes. Of the states that endorsed me, they removed twelve of them, taking me from 30 states to 18."

Prior to the convention, a couple Republican leaders spoke out against the lack of representation for some states at the 2021 Biennial Convention.
