= New York Federation of College Republicans =

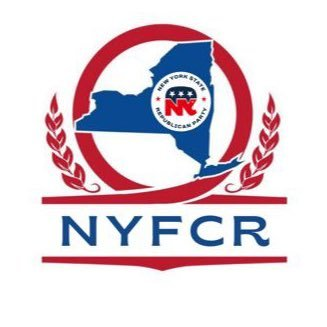
- Chairman: Xavier Engelin
- Split from: College Republican National Committee
- Ideology: Conservatism
- Mother party: Republican Party
- State party: New York Republican State Committee

The New York Federation of College Republicans, also known as the NYFCR, is an organization that oversees College Republicans chapters across the state of New York. The NYFCR and its chapters are made up of college and university students who support the Republican Party of the United States. In 2021, the NYFCR withdrew from the College Republican National Committee. The NYFCR now functions as a collaborative organization, and is affiliated with different Republican and conservative groups in New York state, including the New York Republican State Committee, the New York State Young Republicans, and the New York Young Republican Club.

The executive board of NYFCR is made up of ten positions headed by a chairperson. The current chairman of the organization is Xavier Engelin from SUNY Oswego.

On July 13, 2021, the NYFCR published a dossier alleging that then-chairman Chandler Thornton had been mismanaging the CRNC's funds. The report cited the CRNC's advertising budget, which showed more than $1,000,000 in funds unaccounted for. Uncertainty over the fate of a $122,000 donation from Kid Rock also became a point of contention. Finally, on July 24, the university chapters of the NYFCR voted unanimously to withdraw from the CRNC.

On February 14th 2024, the New York Federation of College Republicans officially chartered with the College Republicans of America (CRA), re-entering the state into the chartering of a national organization.

== Chairman ==
Xavier Engelin

Chairman of the New York Federation of College Republicans
- Incumbent
- Assumed office May 2, 2026
- Preceded by: Steven Margolis

Personal details
- Born: October 8, 2006 (age 19), New York
- Education: SUNY Oswego

Xavier Engelin, a Sophomore at the State University of New York at Oswego, assumed the office of Chairman on May 2, 2026. He majors in History and Business Administration. Before that he served as the organizations Treasurer from September 2025 until May 2026, and as Parliamentarian from April until September 2025. He also led the Oswego College Republicans from 2025 until 2026.

He graduated from Catskill High School in 2024 and resides in Greene County, New York where he serves as the Vice-Chairman of the local Young Republican group.
