= List of chairpersons of the College Republicans =

This is a list of chairpersons of the College Republican National Committee. It includes those persons who served as national chairman of College Republican National Committee and its predecessor organizations, including the American Republican College League, and the Associated University Republican Clubs. The chairperson of the College Republican National Committee is elected at the organization's bi-annual meeting. Unlike the organization's Democratic counterpart, the College Republican National Committee is entirely independent of both the Republican National Committee and the Young Republican National Federation.

== Chairpersons of the College Republican National Committee ==
Chairman	Organization	Term
James F. Burke	American Republican College League	1892
Delmar Hawkins	American Republican College League	1893
Theodore Cox	American Republican College League	1894
L. Brand Vaughan	American Republican College League	1895
James Breck Perkins	American Republican College League	1896
Arnold Davis	American Republican College League	1897–1900
Harry B. Kirtland	American Republican College League	1900–04
Alfred E. Lunt	National Republican College League	1904–08
John Hamlin	Associated University Republican Clubs	1924
George H. Olmsted	Young Republican Organizations for Hoover	1931–32
Charles Curtis	Republican National League	1933
George H. Olmsted	Young Republican National Committee	1934
J. Kenneth Bradley	Division of Young Republican Activities	1935
George H. Olmsted	Young Republican National Federation	1935
J. Kenneth Bradley	Young Republican National Federation	1936
Henry A. Bubb	Young Republican National Federation	1936–38
Donald Hornbeck	Young Republican National Federation	1938–40
Gordon L. Allott	Young Republican National Federation	1941–46
Ralph Elihu Becker	Young Republican National Federation	1946–47
Saralou Mather	College and University Committee	1947
John King	College and University Committee	1947–49
Roger Allan Moore	College Service Committee	1949–53
John R. Begg	College Service Committee	1953–55
Marlin McDaniel	College Service Committee	1955–57
Dan Hofgren	College Service Committee	1957–59
William A. Steiger	College Service Committee	1959–61
Jim Harff	College Service Committee	1961–63
Jerry Dickson	College Service Committee	1963–65
Tom Pauken	College Republican National Committee	1965–67
Gary Fairchild	College Republican National Committee	1967–69
Robert Polack	College Republican National Committee	1969–70
Joe Abate	College Republican National Committee	1970–73
Karl C. Rove	College Republican National Committee	1973–77
John Brady	College Republican National Committee	1977–79
Steve Gibble	College Republican National Committee	1979–81
Jack Abramoff	College Republican National Committee	1981–85
Ted Higgins	College Republican National Committee	1985
David Miner	College Republican National Committee	1985–87
Stockton Reeves	College Republican National Committee	1987–89
Tony Zagotta	College Republican National Committee	1989–93
Bill Spadea	College Republican National Committee	1993–95
Joe Galli	College Republican National Committee	1995–97
Adam Brohimer	College Republican National Committee	1997–99
Scott Stewart	College Republican National Committee	1999–2003
Eric Hoplin	College Republican National Committee	2003–05
Paul Gourley	College Republican National Committee	2005–07
Charlie Smith	College Republican National Committee	2007–09
Zach Howell	College Republican National Committee	2009–11
Alex Schriver	College Republican National Committee	2011–13
Alexandra C. Smith	College Republican National Committee	2013–17
Chandler Thornton	College Republican National Committee	2017–21
Courtney Britt	College Republican National Committee	2021–2025
JT Marshburn	College Republican National Committee	2025 - Present

== See also ==
- College Republican National Committee
- Republican National Committee
