= The College Fix =

American conservative news website

- Website type: Political; News; Higher education
- Available in: English
- Owner: Student Free Press Association
- Creator: John J. Miller
- Editor: Jennifer Kabbany
- Website: www.thecollegefix.com
- Launched: 2011

The College Fix is an American conservative leaning news website focused on higher education. It was created in 2011 by journalist John J. Miller and is published by the nonprofit 501(c)(3) Student Free Press Association (SFPA). The site's slogan is "Breaking campus news, launching media careers." It once claimed to feature "right-minded news and commentary" and often reports on what it describes as "political correctness" with a mission of exposing liberal "bias and abuse" at American colleges.

The Fix features student and non-student writers. It is based in Hillsdale, Michigan. Rick DeVos, the son of former US Secretary of Education Betsy DeVos, formerly sat on the Fix's board.

== Model ==
The Chronicle of Higher Education described The College Fix as a website designed to recruit "young conservatives for careers in the news media by placing college students in internships with right-leaning publications." Miller had long desired "to help other conservative and libertarian campus journalists" and The Fix gives them a platform where they will get "more attention than from just the campus level."

As of 2025, The Fix had four full-time editors and one part-time editor who oversee a network of approximately 100 contributors.

== Accuracy, funding and editorial stance ==
The Chronicle of Higher Education reported in 2015 that some subjects covered by The Fix had accused the website of misreporting their stories. The Fix editor Jennifer Kabbany defended the site's coverage and said that the site offers those it covers an opportunity to comment. In addition, Kabbany told NPR in April 2018 that the site "has publicly denounced any vile emails that a professor might get."

In February 2017 Inside Higher Ed probed whether The Fix had failed to disclose its relationship to the son of Betsy DeVos, weeks before her appointment as the US Secretary of Education. As early as 2015, Rick DeVos had served as a board member of Student Free Press Association, though this relationship was not disclosed in the site's coverage of DeVos. Days after the report John Miller apologized and took blame for the oversight.

The Donors Capital Fund gave $365,600 to the Student Free Press Association from 2014 to 2015, before ceasing contributions. The site reported receiving $749,509 in contributions from various sources in 2018.

== Staff ==
- John J. Miller, founder and executive director
- Katherine Miller, founding editor-in-chief
- Nathan Harden, editor-in-chief from 2012 to 2014
- Jennifer Kabbany, current editor-in-chief

== Notable alumni ==
- Virginia Aabram, First Things
- Kyle Blaine, CNN
- Jack Butler, National Review
- Brook Conrad, Baltimore Sun
- Alexandra DeSanctis, National Review
- David Hookstead, Outkick
- Vivian Jones, The Tennessean
- Peter Maxwell, WXYZ-TV
- Adam O'Neal, The Economist
- Kyle Peterson, Wall Street Journal
- Jeremiah Poff, Washington Examiner
- Madeline Fry Schultz, Washington Examiner
- Brittany Slaughter, WSET-TV
- Robby Soave, Reason
- Andrew Stiles, Washington Free Beacon

== See also ==
- Campus Reform
