= College Republicans of America =

American college political organization

College Republicans of America (CRA) is a national organization of Republican college students in the United States. Founded in 2023, it supports Republican candidates and organizes campus chapters. It is distinct from the College Republican National Committee (CRNC) and the National Federation of College Republicans (NFCR).

== History ==
CRA emerged during a period of divisions among national College Republican organizations. According to reporting by Newsweek, former California College Republicans chairman Will Donahue worked with Wisconsin College Republicans chairman William Blathras and colleagues in California to establish the organization.

In July 2025, CRA announced that nine state federations had affiliated with it and said that its network comprised 280 campus chapters. It also requested recognition from the Republican National Committee as an official college auxiliary. Newsweek subsequently reported that it could not independently verify the competing organizations' chapter totals. In May 2026, The New York Times reported that CRA had not received the requested recognition.

=== 2026 leadership and affiliation disputes ===
In March 2026, CRA appointed Brigham Young University student Kai Schwemmer as political director. The Salt Lake Tribune reported that the appointment drew criticism from some conservatives and Anti-Defamation League chief executive Jonathan Greenblatt over Schwemmer's past statements criticized as antisemitic. Martin Bertao, CRA’s president at the time, defended the appointment.

The New York Times placed the appointment within wider divisions among College Republicans over the far right. It reported that Alabama's College Republican federation had been considering affiliation with CRA, but its chairman expressed concern about the appointment. Bertao said CRA had selected Schwemmer for his organizing abilities and rejected racism and antisemitism.

The newspaper also reported disagreement over an April 2026 appearance by white nationalist Jared Taylor at Salisbury University, organized by the CRA-affiliated Maryland College Republicans. Bertao said CRA had not endorsed the event, had asked organizers not to use its branding, and did not control local chapters' activities.

== Organization and activities ==
=== Governance ===
As of October 2026, CRA lists Colson Thomas as its president.

In a report first published in October 2025, Newsweek described CRA's governance as centralized, with Donahue serving as chairman and selecting its president. The report contrasted this structure with the NFCR's elected executive board and discussed the groups' campaigning, leadership training and professional-development activities.

=== Campaigning and training ===
CRA endorsed Donald Trump in 2023 for the 2024 presidential election. The Salt Lake Tribune reported that the political director's role included coordinating with chapter leaders to select races and mobilize support for CRA-endorsed candidates. The newspaper also described the organization's stated goals of training members for roles in government and industry. In its reporting on competing College Republican organizations, Newsweek identified leadership training, fundraising and opportunities for entry-level political work among their activities.
