= Teen Age Republicans =

American political youth organization

National Teen Age Republicans
- Founded: 1960; 66 years ago
- Ideology: Conservatism
- Mother party: Republican Party
- Website: www.teenagerepublicans.org

National Teen Age Republicans (TARs) is one of the youth wings of the United States Republican Party. The group's membership consists of Republicans from ages 13 to 17.

TARs has had a presence in all 50 U.S. states and the District of Columbia, with membership in the tens of thousands. TARs is the first of the three official youth wings of the Republican National Committee, along with Young Republican National Federation and College Republicans.

== History ==
The oldest recorded TAR group was formed in 1960 in South Dakota.

National TARS was founded in 1964.

The first national conference was held in Washington D.C. at Trinity College on June 16–21, 1969, and ever since National TARs has hosted an annual Teen Age Republican Leader Conference (TLC). Following his 1980 election victory, Ronald Reagan held a reception for delegates to the TLC, where he stated that TARs "had a significant impact in the outcome of the last election...you walked the precincts, you licked stamps, stuffed envelopes, got senior citizens to the polls, and babysat while mothers voted...what you did [made] the difference between winning and losing".

TARS Alumni include: Karl Rove, Joe Wilson, Roger Wicker, Chase Blasi, Lawrence Lessig, Paris Dennard, Frank Luntz, J. D. Hayworth and Rob Bishop.
