= Response Dynamics =

Response Dynamics, Inc.
- Type: S corporation
- Industry: Direct marketing
- Founded: 1981; 45 years ago
- Headquarters: Vienna, Virginia, United States
- Key people: Ron Kanfer, President; David A. Kunko, Secretary
- Website: www.responsedynamicsinc.com

Response Dynamics, Inc. is a privately held Vienna, Virginia-based direct marketing company. It was founded in 1981 and specializes in political fundraising and direct mail marketing. The company boasts in-house copy editing, art design, database management, and a list brokerage service. Most direct mail fundraising firms cater to a particular partisan segment, and RDI is considered one of the top firms servicing conservative causes.

RDI's aggressive marketing strategy received national attention after it was revealed that the company targeted the elderly with misleading practices, including solicitations and using misleading letterhead and language. Fundraising solicitations from the College Republican National Committee in 2004, appeared to be solicitations for Republican National Committee or Bush-Cheney 2004, misleading many elderly contributors. The College Republicans stopped using the company due to negative media reports on these misleading solicitations, ending a more than ten-year relationship.

Others who have used the company include Representative Robert K. Dornan, and Floyd Brown during the 2008 presidential race.

== See also ==
- Direct mail fundraising
- Direct marketing associations
- Microtargeting
