= College Republican National Committee =

American organization of college and university students supporting the Republican Party

- Chairman: JT Marshburn (GA)
- Co-Chairman: Cara Pocono (VA)
- Executive Director: Ian Waite
- Founded: May 17, 1892; 134 years ago (as American Republican College League)
- Headquarters: Washington, D.C., U.S.
- Ideology: Conservatism; Fiscal conservatism Social conservatism
- Mother party: Republican Party
- International affiliation: International Young Democrat Union
- Website: www.crnc.org

The College Republican National Committee (CRNC) is a national organization for College Republicans, including college and university students who support the Republican Party in the United States. The organization is known as an active recruiting tool for the party and has produced many prominent Republican and conservative activists and introduced more party members to the Republican Party than any other organization in the nation. Following Chairwoman Courtney Britt's departure from the RNC and RNC Chairman Michael Whatley's dissolution of the RNC's "Youth Advisory Board," the CRNC lost its official endorsement and ties to the RNC.

The organizational structure of the College Republicans has changed significantly since its founding in 1892. Founded as an organization for the Republican National Committee, the College Republicans now operate as an independent 527 group. After the Young Republican National Federation was spun off from the College Republicans organization in 1972, the groups operate independently of one another.

== History ==
=== 19th century ===
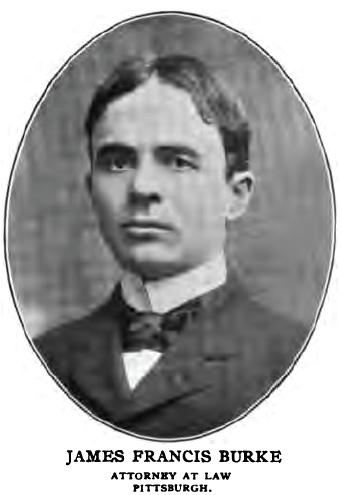
James F. Burke, who spearheaded the organization as a University of Michigan Law School student and was later elected to the U.S. House of Representatives

"There is no such school for political education as the college and university. What is inculcated here penetrates every corner of the country where the college man goes. He goes everywhere and where he goes he is a mighty force in making and molding public sentiment."

— William McKinley at the founding of the American Republican College League in 1892

The College Republicans were founded as the American Republican College League on May 17, 1892, at the University of Michigan. The organization was spearheaded by law student James Francis Burke, who later was elected as a U.S. Representative, where represented Pennsylvania's 31st congressional district.

The inaugural meeting was attended by over 1,000 students from across the country, including students from Stanford University in the west to Harvard University in the east. Contemporary politicians also attended the meeting, including Judge John M. Thurston, Senator Russell A. Alger, Congressman J. Sloat Fassett, John M. Langston, and A. J. Lester, who succeeded Abraham Lincoln in Illinois House of Representatives. William McKinley, then governor of Ohio, gave a rousing keynote speech.

=== 20th century ===
The College Republicans quickly pursued a strategy of sending college students to vote in their home districts and registering others to vote where they schooled to swing closely contested districts. This strategy was successfully implemented for the 1900 presidential election between William McKinley and William Jennings Bryan, helping win Bryan's home state of Nebraska for McKinley.

The College Republicans were financed, at least in part, by the Republican National Committee throughout much of its history. Burke received significant funding from the RNC to support the American Republican College League's founding and to maintain the organization's early offices in New York City and Chicago. By 1924, the organization was operating directly under the auspices of the RNC as the Associated University Republican Clubs.

The relative dominance of the Democratic Party through the 1930s through the 1960s coincided with a precipitous drop in the membership and effectiveness of the College Republicans. In 1931, the College Republicans were absorbed as an arm of the Hoover campaign. For the next several years the organization operated alternately under the auspices of the "Republican National League," "Young Republican National Committee," and the "Division of Young Republican Activities."

In 1935, the College Republicans were merged into the newly created Young Republican National Federation, encompassing both college students and young professionals. College Republican operations continued under the Young Republicans until the 1965 founding of the "College Republican National Committee."

In 1967, Morton Blackwell, then a field representative for the CRNC to Kentucky, developed many of the principles now used by the College Republicans. As the college organizer supporting Louie Nunn's campaign for Governor of Kentucky, Blackwell organized approximately 5,000 college student volunteers who dropped 93,000 pieces of literature, posted 20,000 flyers, mailed 15,000 hand-addressed and signed postcards to friends of known student supporters of Nunn, and processed over 8,000 absentee ballots. On election day, Nunn became the first Republican governor of Kentucky in 20 years. The New York Times and Louie Nunn himself credited the efforts of Blackwell's volunteers.

In 1970, the Young Republican National Federation was permanently spun off from the College Republicans in 1970 to prevent counterproductive infighting among the two groups. In 1972 the Republican National Committee made the College Republican National Committee an auxiliary arm of the RNC.

In 1973, Karl Rove ran for chair of the College Republicans. He challenged the front-runner's delegates, throwing the national convention into disarray, after which both he and his opponent, Robert Edgeworth, claimed victory. The dispute was resolved when Rove was selected through the direct order of the chairman of the Republican National Committee, who at the time was George H W Bush.

"College Republicans are a vital force in conservative politics. You are the vanguard of the Republican Party. I know that the strength of young people's support for our Party will ensure the continued success of Republican goals as you begin to assume leadership roles in the Party and in our Nation."

— Ronald Reagan to the College Republican National Committee, June 2, 1987

By 1980, only 20 active College Republican chapters remained. By the US presidential election in 1980, that number had increased to 1,000 active clubs, helping Reagan win 98 of 105 mock elections and recruiting thousands of voters. This success led to $290,000 in financial assistance from the RNC, mainly to implement Jack Abramoff's field representative program. Abramoff's fund-raising efforts brought in an additional $1,160,000 during the next two years. By 1983, only 10% of the CRNC's budget came from the RNC.

=== 21st century ===
Prompted by the 2002 Bipartisan Campaign Reform Act, CRNC left the control of the RNC by reconstituting as a 527 group, allowing it to operate independently and raise unlimited amount of money for issue-advocacy work. As a 527 group, the organization is prohibited from coordinating directly with a particular campaign and its recent focus has turned towards developing volunteers and other support activities rather than outright campaigning. The shift has allowed the CRNC to vastly expand its fundraising efforts. During its first two years, the CRNC raised $17.3 million, most going to pay fundraising costs and other administrative costs, while leaving more than $2 million to expand the field representative program and to improve pay for the full-time positions.

CRNC was criticized for its relationship with Response Dynamics, a Virginia-based direct mail company. The relationship became an issue during the 2005 election for National Chairman, which was won by former CRNC Treasurer, Paul Gourley, whose signature was on the questionable fundraising letters.

In September 2006, Morgan Wilkins, a CRNC field representative for the 2006 U.S. elections, was placed on probation by the CRNC after telling the Michigan Daily that several controversial events, including "Catch an Illegal Immigrant Day" and "Fun with Guns Day", in which students would shoot cardboard cutouts of prominent Democrats, might be held on the University of Michigan's main campus in Ann Arbor, Michigan. This incident ultimately became a major news story on several national media outlets. Several sources, including the Michigan Daily incorrectly identified Ms. Wilkins as an employee of the Republican National Committee, rather than the CRNC, eliciting an outcry from Democratic National Committee Chairman, Howard Dean. In return, GOP Chairman Ken Mehlman condemned Wilkins' activities, as well as Governor Dean. Keith Olbermann named Wilkins his "Worst Person in the World." She was suspended for the incident, and later fired by the CRNC for later creating a Facebook group in which she promised to make out with individuals who signed up volunteers for get out the vote efforts.

In 2013, Alexandra Smith became the first elected female national chair of the College Republicans organization, and the first female national chair of the CRNC.

In 2021, two women claimed a senior member of the CRNC asked them to falsely accuse Clay Smith, chairman challenger to current CRNC Chairwoman Courtney Britt (then chair of the CRNC-affiliated Virginia Federation), of sexual misconduct. Texts obtained by the National Review between the women and the senior official and CRNC Chairman Emeritus Chandler Thornton confirmed the allegations brought forth by the two women. Britt stated that the scandal was a "false narrative" and that "If some grand conspiracy to accuse my former political opponent of sexual misconduct existed, I was certainly never aware of it" in response to accusations of her involvement.

According to a letter published by National Review, Thornton used his powers as chairman to interpret CRNC bylaws in an unprecedented fashion in order to help elect Britt. British Magazine The Spectator claims that Thornton "groomed" Britt for a chairperson role within the organization. Along with this, the CRNC was accused of mismanaging funds, having allocated $1,050,000 to "digital marketing" over 2018 to 2021, despite having spent $164 on digital marketing in that time frame. According to OpenSecrets, in 2022 a majority of CRNC expenditures were for "fundraising mailings & calls," with no money being spent on digital advertising and only 2.6% of expenditures being spent on any sort of media. Along with this, the NYFCR's "2021 CRNC Dossier" alleges other financial crimes had been committed by the CRNC.

The College Republican National Committee is a member of the International Young Democrat Union.

== Governance ==
=== College Republican National Committee ===
The College Republican National Committee (CRNC), has historically been the national steering organization and oversight body for all 50 state federations, reaching, at its apex, over 1,500 campus chapters, and 250,000 College Republicans in the country. The CRNC National Chairman and his or her national leadership team, including an executive director, political director, finance director, comptroller, national field director, national treasurer, national secretary, and 4 regional vice-chairs, are elected at the bi-annual College Republican Convention and are assisted by a full-time office staff.

=== State federations ===
There are 3 verifiably non-defunct College Republican State federations still chartered with the CRNC, including Oregon, Vermont, and Maine. These CRNC-affiliated College Republican state federations each administer the College Republican activities at the state level. The CRNC does not directly make public which chapters have chartered with the organization.

Many state federations, such as that of New York, Texas, Mississippi, and North Dakota, as well as the federation for U.S. territory of Puerto Rico, are independent from the CRNC, with some a part of rival organizations such as the "National Federation of College Republicans" or the "College Republicans of America." In 2022, the Colorado Federation of College Republicans' was expelled from the CRNC, marking the first time this action had occurred.

The state federation leadership team, which includes a state chairperson and other officers, serve as the primary link between local university chapters and the national College Republican National Committee. The state chairman serves as the representative for College Republicans when dealing with the state Republican Party, local media, and governmental entities. State federations are responsible for organizing and assisting local chapters with securing proper credentials, recruitment efforts, and campus voter canvasses. It is a state federation's responsibility to organize and implement activities for statewide campaigns. Like the national organization, state federations operate as non-profit associations that are not legally affiliated with the Republican Party.

=== Campus chapters ===
The college and university-based chapters of the College Republicans operate in a dual capacity as student clubs associated with a particular campus and as members of their state federation and the College Republican National Committee. Like the state federations and national committee, the campus chapters are affiliated with their local Republican Party, but are not official arms of that organization. The chapter chairperson and leadership team are responsible for maintaining the campus club's credentials and constitution, and representing the College Republicans when dealing with university administration, other student groups, and in the surrounding community. The campus chapter leadership team might include many members, with administrative responsibilities delegated to dormitory and Greek chapter chairpersons.

== National leadership ==
As of 2021, the CRNC Board of Directors consists of:

- Chairman: JT Marshburn
- Co-chairman: Cara Pocono
- Treasurer: Naomi Speakman
- Secretary: Will Rohney
- Midwest Regional Vice Chairman: Makenzie Jones
- Northeast Regional Vice Chairman: Cody Porter
- South Regional Vice Chairman: Alex Schramkowski
- West Regional Vice Chairman:
- Comptroller:

== Notable members ==
- Greg Abbott, current governor of Texas
- Jack Abramoff, lobbyist
- Lee Atwater, Republican strategist
- Charles R. Black Jr., lobbyist and advisor to 2008 McCain presidential campaign
- Morton Blackwell, conservative activist
- Hillary Clinton, former First Lady and U.S. Secretary of State who later became a Democrat after the Vietnam War
- Calvin Coolidge, 30th president of the United States
- Rick Davis, manager, 2008 McCain presidential campaign
- Jim Gilmore, former governor of Virginia
- Patrick McHenry, U.S. Representative and Speaker Pro Tempore of the House of Representatives
- Grover Norquist, president, Americans for Tax Reform
- Tom Pauken, chairman emeritus, Texas Republican Party
- Ralph E. Reed Jr., Christian Coalition executive director and political consultant
- Karl Rove, former Senior Advisor to President George W. Bush and current contributor to Fox News
- Paul Ryan, former U.S. Representative and 54th Speaker of the U.S. House of Representatives
- Rick Santorum, former U.S. Senator
- Jeff Sessions, former U.S. Attorney General and U.S. Senator
- Shawn Steel, Republican National Committeeman from California and former Chairman of the California Republican Party
- Roger Stone, political consultant
- Roger Wicker, U.S. Senator
- Joshua Workman, Canadian political consultant
- Pete Wilson, 36th governor of California

== Activities ==
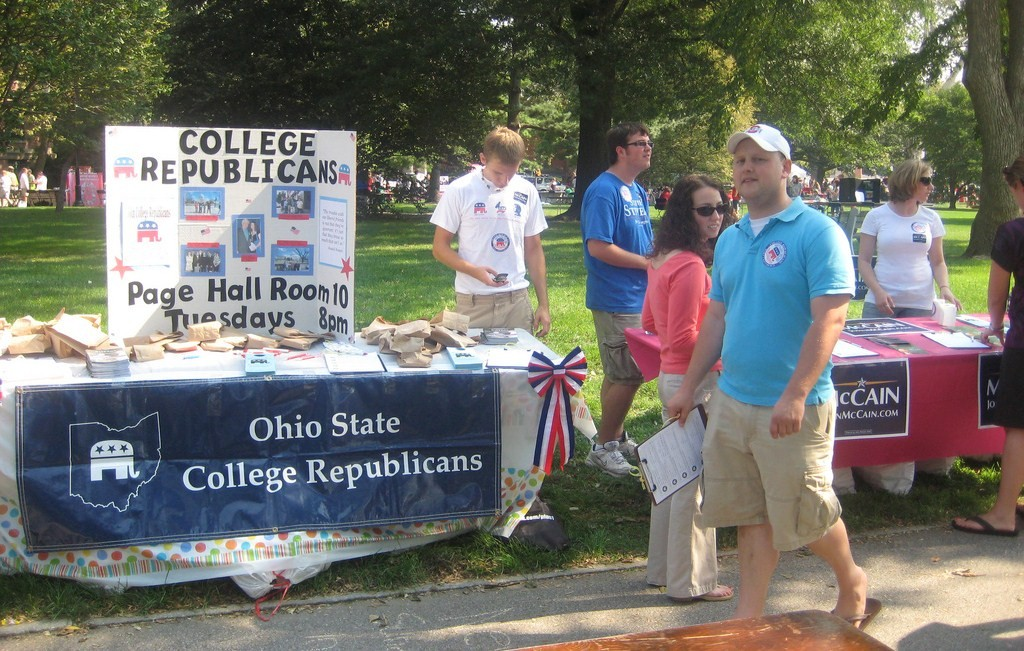
Recruiting new members at Ohio State University

The CRNC organizes election-year field representative programs to send paid staffers to recruit and train students and chapters nationwide. Former national chair Jack Abramoff founded the field representative program in 1981. The program faltered during the 1980s and was revived during the late 1990s.

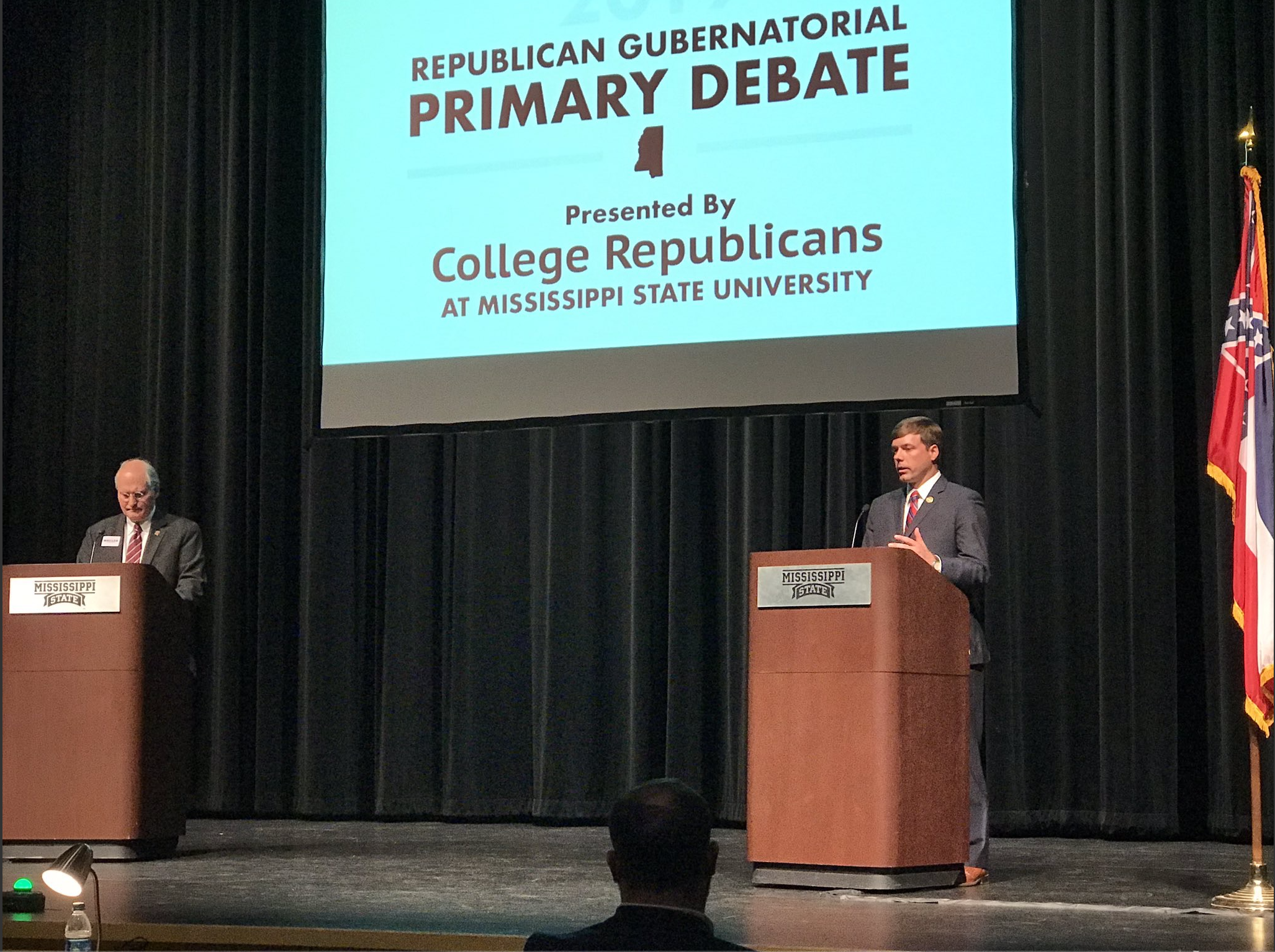
College Republicans at Mississippi State University host the 2019 Mississippi Republican Gubernatorial Debate.

During the election season, campus chapters are responsible for organizing and implementing the campus canvas, running mock elections, managing the local get-out-the-vote efforts. At other times, the campus chapters will organize issue advocacy and lobbying efforts, welcome conservative guest speakers to campus, and organize social events and other recruitment activities.

During the election season, the CRNC focuses on developing a "mass based youth effort" directed toward electing Republican candidates. The CRNC often sends paid field representatives to individual campuses to assist in organizing the election efforts. Generally the hired field representative or chapter chair begins the school year with membership tables on campus for recruitment. Members use door-to-door canvassing and word of mouth to identify and register as many Republican voters among the student body as possible. These individuals are encouraged to vote through an absentee ballot and assist the candidates with election day Get Out The Vote efforts. Chapters occasionally run student mock elections and other special events as a means to gain positive earned media attention for a candidate.

== Gallery ==
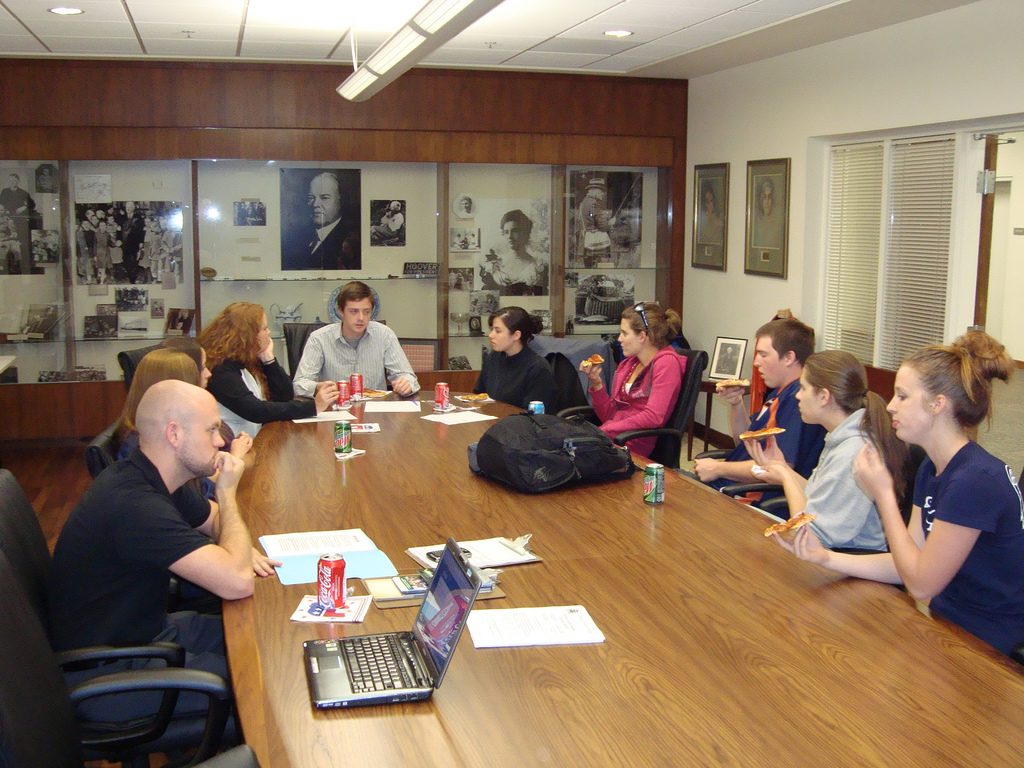
A campus chapter meeting at George Fox University

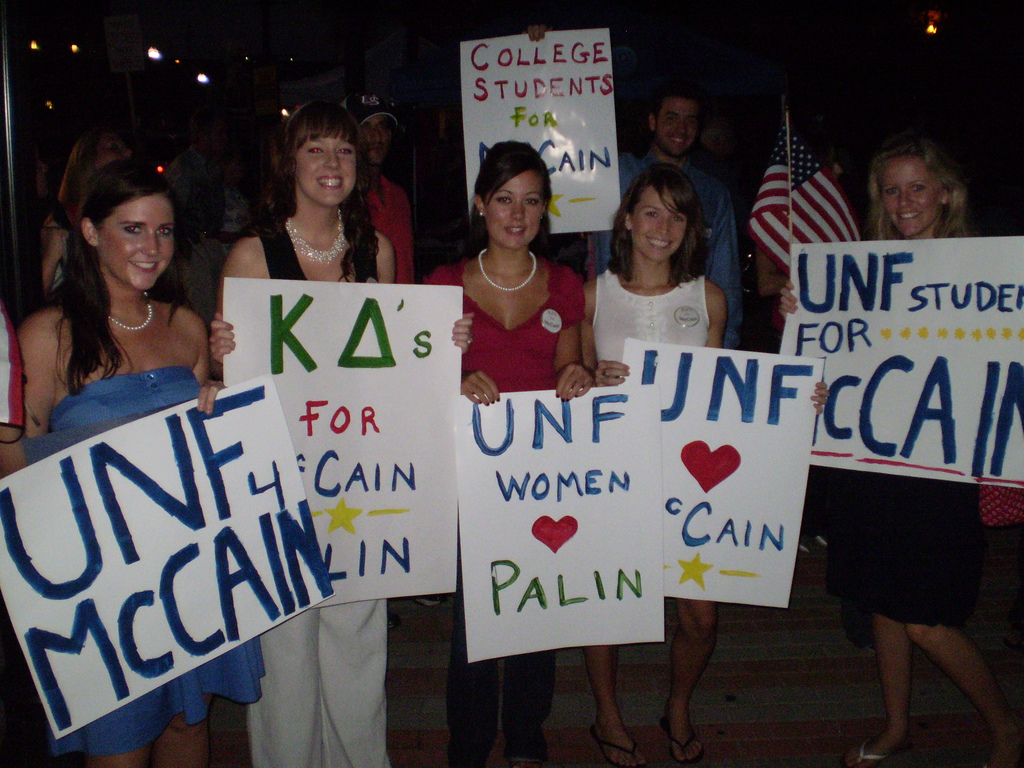
College Republicans from University of North Florida rally for John McCain in Jacksonville, Florida

== See also ==
- List of Chairpersons of the College Republicans
- Republican National Committee
- Young Republicans
- Teenage Republicans
- The New York Young Republican Club
- College Democrats of America
- College Democrats
