= College Republicans =

American political organization for university students

College Republicans is an umbrella term that describes college and university students who support the Republican Party of the United States. The leading national organization, College Republicans of America, is the newest and largest group, created to align with President Donald J. Trump and the "America-First" agenda. The Republican Party is not affiliated with any college groups, although Republican Party members often benefit from college students' campaign efforts on their behalf. Campus chapters may function independently, may be part of a statewide organization, or may be affiliated with a national alliance such as CRNC. The various campus-based Republican clubs function as recruitment organizations for the Republican Party and have produced many prominent Republican and conservative activists.

== Notable organizations ==
Notable national college Republican organizations include:

- College Republican National Committee (CRNC)
- National Federation of College Republicans (NFCR)
- College Republicans of America (CRA)
- College Republicans United (CRU)

== Governance of national organizations ==
=== College Republican National Committee (CRNC) ===
The College Republican National Committee (CRNC), has historically been the main national College Republicans organization. Founded in 1892, it remains the largest and most active College Republicans organization with around 20 chapters on campuses across the United States. The CRNC National Chairwoman and the national leadership team, including an executive director, political director, finance director, comptroller, national field director, treasurer, national secretary, and 4 regional vice-chairs, are elected at the bi-annual College Republican Convention. The current CRNC National Chairwoman is Courtney Britt.

In recent years, the CRNC has lost many of its state affiliates and chapters.

=== College Republicans United (CRU) ===
The College Republicans United (CRU) was established in 2018 to oppose what was seen as a CRNC that was hostile to President Donald Trump. It consists of various college chapters in Arizona and Iowa. The leadership structure and bylaws of the organization are not made public. The CRU have been criticized for chapters which allegedly posted "anti-Semitic" and "racist" postings online, causing rifts between the CRU and other CR organizations and donors, and has been described as "far-right". The CRU drew further outrage after inviting Nick Fuentes, a noted "white nationalist," to their National Convention event. The group previously invited another white nationalist, Jared Taylor, to speak at a campus event.

On January 31, 2025, CRU set up a table at Arizona State University's Tempe campus, "to urge students to report their peers for deportation to the U.S. Immigration and Customs Enforcement." The CRU is currently the smallest federation by state and chapter count, containing 5 collegiate chapters.

In October 2026 preceding the 2026 Arizona elections, CRU set up several signs around Arizona calling upon to "Protect White Americans", a phrase among white nationalism alluding to the white genocide conspiracy theory. The company hired to print the signs refused to print the full message, describing it as hate speech, leading CRU members to amend White in the space between the words Protect and Americans. The graphic design also included an unlicensed use of an Instagram photograph of YouTubers Felix Kjellberg (PewDiePie) and Marzia Kjellberg (CutiePieMarzia) with their son. The Kjellbergs are not American citizens, being a Swedish man, an Italian woman, and their toddler living in Japan since 2022.

=== National Federation of College Republicans (NFCR) ===
The National Federation of College Republicans was created in 2022 in response to controversies arising in the CRNC. The NFCR encompasses 26 state federations (including but not limited to Florida, Texas, New York, North Carolina, and Louisiana). The NFCR Leadership positions consist of a chairperson, a National Vice Chairperson, an executive director, a treasurer, a secretary, and a Parliamentarian. Rachel Howard is the current National Chairwoman of the NFCR.

=== College Republicans of America (CRA) ===
The College Republicans of America (CRA) was established in 2023 and encompasses seventeen federations (Arizona, California, Kansas, Idaho, Louisiana, Maryland, Massachusetts, New Hampshire, New York, Ohio, Pennsylvania, Tennessee, Virginia, Missouri, Utah, Washington D.C., and Wisconsin); a plurality of clubs in Kentucky, Minnesota, Nebraska, North Dakota, Rhode Island, and West Virginia; and a few clubs in several additional states. The CRA has over 300 active, affiliated College Republicans chapters. Some notable chapters are the Penn State College Republicans, for the Pennsylvania Collegiate Leadership Conference and sizable deployments, and the Harvard Republican Club, for history and influence. They were joined in 2026 by the previously independent University of Florida College Republicans, one of the largest and most influential College Republican organizations.

According to the CRA website, its members broke away from the CRNC due to it falling "into disrepair." The CRA President and the national committee consist of an appointed president, appointed vice-presidents, appointed directors, and annually elected regional representatives. The CRA also has a Board of Governors which consist of one National Committeeman per state, elected or appointed by that state (so long as they are "in good standing") via however the state sees fit. The CRA President is Colson Thomas, who was appointed by Founder and Chairman William Branson Donahue.

The CRA endorsed Donald Trump for president during the 2024 United States presidential election and campaigned for him during the 2024 Iowa Republican presidential caucuses. Then-CRA President, Gabriel Guidarini, delivered the pledge of allegiance at the 2024 Republican National Convention.

The group has ties to Turning Point Action (TPA), with the COO of TPA serving on the CRA's advisory board.

== Governance of state organizations ==
=== State federations ===
There are upwards of 40 College Republican state federations. Each federation administers the College Republican activities at the state level. The state federation leadership team, which includes a state chairperson and other officers, serve as the primary link between local university chapters and the national federation. The state chairman serves as the representative for College Republicans when dealing with the state Republican Party, local media, and governmental entities. State federations are responsible for organizing and assisting local chapters with securing proper credentials, recruitment efforts, and campus voter canvasses. It is a state federation's responsibility to organize and implement activities for statewide campaigns. Like the national organization, state federations operate as non-profit associations that are not legally affiliated with the Republican Party.

=== Campus chapters ===
The college and university-based chapters of College Republicans operate in a dual capacity as student clubs associated with a particular campus and as members of their state federation. Like the state federations and national committees, the campus chapters are affiliated with their local Republican Party, but are not official arms of that organization. The chapter chairperson and leadership team are responsible for maintaining the campus club's credentials and constitution, and representing the College Republicans when dealing with university administration, other student groups, and in the surrounding community. The campus chapter leadership team might include many members, with administrative responsibilities delegated to dormitory and Greek chapter chairpersons.

== Activities ==
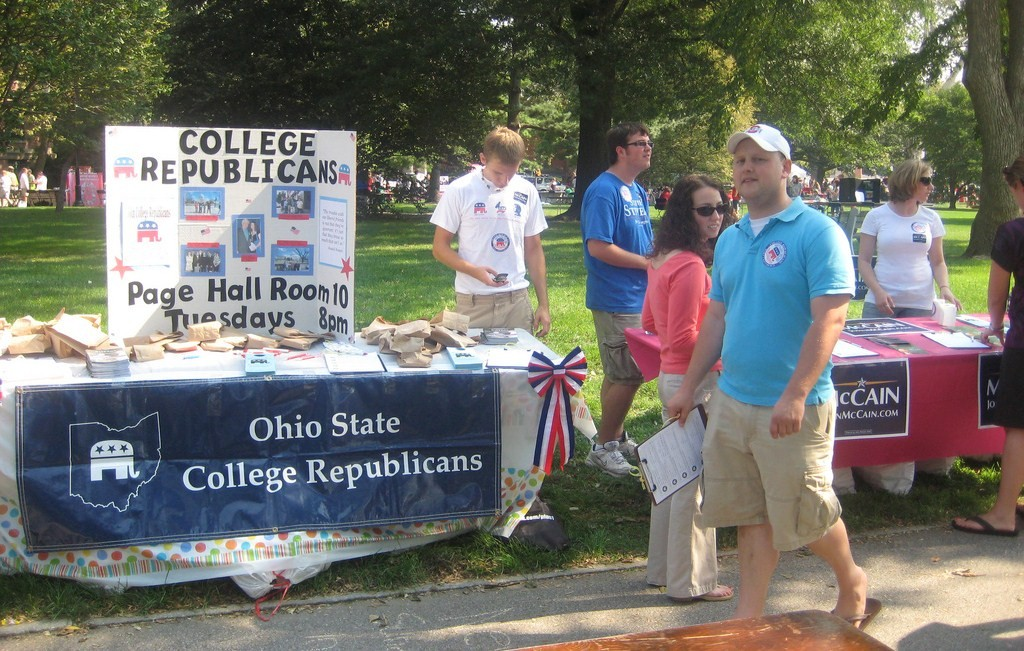
Recruiting new members at Ohio State University

During election season, campus chapters are responsible for organizing and implementing the campus canvas, running mock elections, managing the local get-out-the-vote efforts. At other times, the campus chapters will organize issue advocacy and lobbying efforts, welcome conservative guest speakers to campus, and organize social events and other recruitment activities.

Generally, the hired field representative or chapter chair begins the school year with membership tables on campus for recruitment. Members use door-to-door canvassing and word of mouth to identify and register as many Republican voters among the student body as possible. These individuals are encouraged to vote through an absentee ballot and assist the candidates with election day Get Out The Vote efforts. Chapters occasionally run student mock elections and other special events as a means to gain positive earned media attention for a candidate.

== Gallery ==
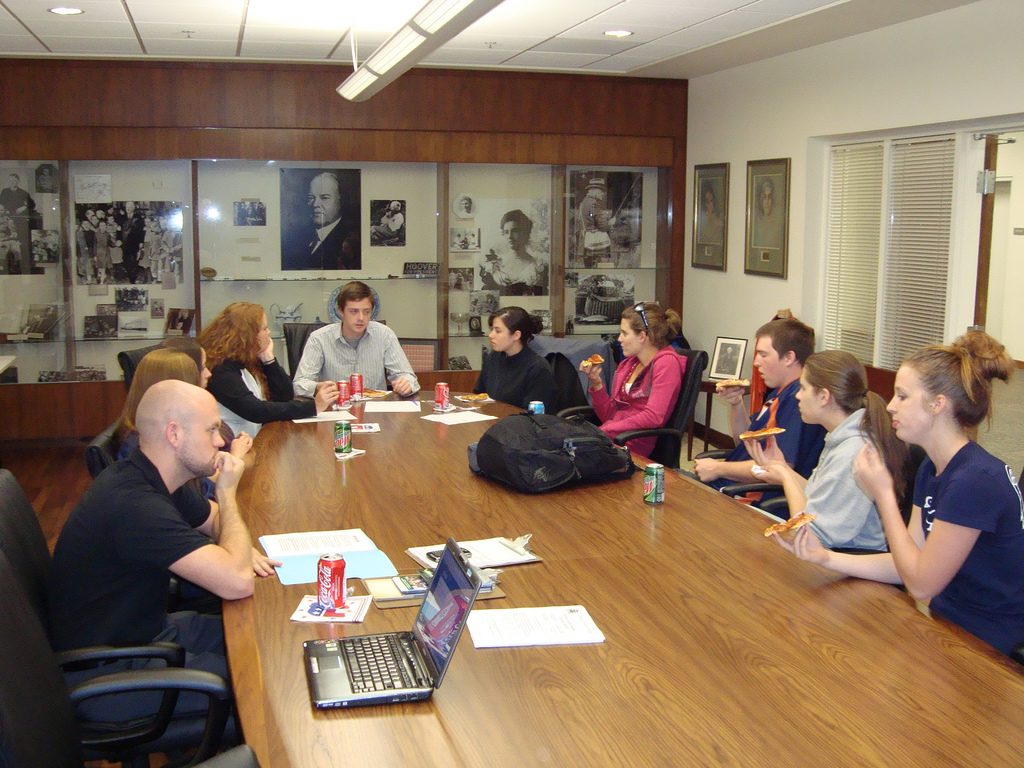
A campus chapter meeting at George Fox University

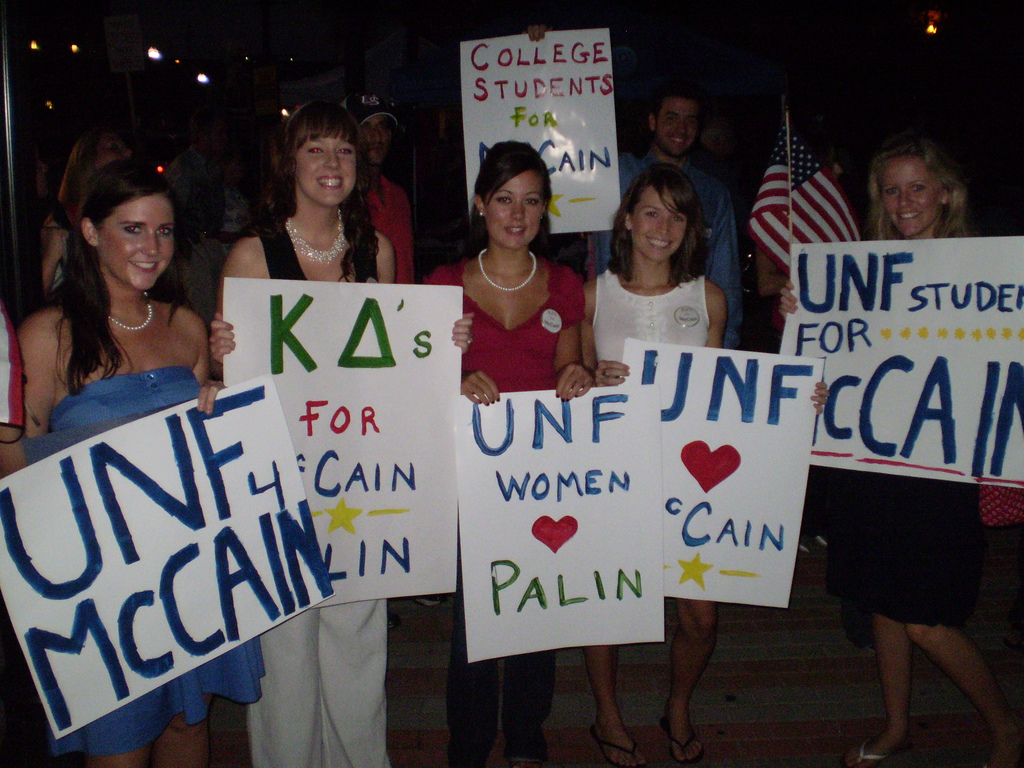
College Republicans from University of North Florida rally for John McCain in Jacksonville, Florida

== See also ==
- College Republican National Committee (CRNC)
- List of Chairpersons of the College Republicans
- Republican National Committee
- Young Republicans
- Teenage Republicans
- Turning Point USA
- College Democrats of America
- College Democrats
- Young Democratic Socialists of America
