= Young Republicans =

American political youth organization

Young Republican National Federation
- National Chairman: Hayden Padgett
- National Co-Chairman: Catherine Whiteford
- Founded: April 23, 1931; 95 years ago
- Headquarters: Washington, D.C.
- Mother party: Republican Party
- International affiliation: International Young Democrat Union
- Website: www.yrnf.com

The Young Republican National Federation (YRNF), commonly referred to as the Young Republicans (YR), is a 527 organization for members of the Republican Party of the United States between the ages of 18 and 40. It has both a national organization and chapters in individual states.

Young Republican clubs are both social and political in nature. Many of them sponsor various social events and networking events for members. In addition, Young Republican clubs assist Republican political candidates and causes.

In 2025, Politico released over 2,900 pages of messages from a leaked Young Republicans group chat that included racist, antisemitic and violent rhetoric. This led to the removal and firing of several high-ranking leaders of the organization, including some who held political positions or worked for elected officials.

== History ==
Although Young Republican organizations existed as early as 1856 with the founding of the New York Young Republican Club, the Young Republican National Federation was formed by George H. Olmsted at the urging of Herbert Hoover. The YRNF was officially founded in 1931.

=== 1965 California Young Republicans leadership scandal ===
The California Young Republicans became embroiled in a scandal in 1965 when George King Jr. and Ray Drake, who had been elected president and corresponding secretary, respectively, of the Long Beach, California chapter of the group, were discovered to have an affiliation with far-right groups, particularly the American Nazi Party (ANP).

This affiliation was revealed when Steven Dale Ahern, who claimed to be a former member of the ANP, testified that there was a plan by Ralph Perry Forbes, the head of the California ANP, to seize control of several California Young Republicans branches. He claimed that both Drake and King, both members of the ANP, had been elected based on funds and on Forbes's order. Forbes denied this and said that Ahern was untrustworthy. Both King and Drake had been members of several other far-right groups and King had been previously arrested for owning a machine gun. Drake said he had supported the ANP ideologically, had attended many of their meetings, and marched with them in Nazi uniform, but denied being a member officially.

This resulted in widespread criticism from state GOP politicians and internal debate; concerned about an infiltration of the YNRF by the ANP, King and Drake were investigated by the board of directors of the state-level California Young Republicans organization, who aimed to purge the organization of Nazi and ANP influences. State Assemblyman George Deukmejian heavily campaigned for their expulsion. It was debated whether the entire Long Beach chapter be ousted, and ultimately King and Drake were ousted from the party. Senator Barry Goldwater praised the YRNF for expelling the pair.

=== 2025 Telegram chat leaks ===
In October 2025, Politico reported on 2,900 pages of leaked Telegram chats from high-ranking Young Republicans leaders nationwide. The chats spanned more than seven months. Many participants work in government or party politics, including Vermont state senator Samuel Douglass and U.S. Small Business Administration adviser Michael Bartels. The chats caused bipartisan controversy and condemnation due to racist and antisemitic slurs, white supremacist slogans and symbols, comments encouraging rape of political opponents to cause suicide, praise for Adolf Hitler, promotion of gas chambers, and enthusiasm for Republicans who they believed supported slavery.

=== 2026 New Yorker investigation ===
In 2026, The New Yorker published an article titled "The New York Young Republican Club Has an Antisemitism Problem". The article stated that a former treasurer of the organization had made antisemitic remarks and made a Nazi salute. He denied both accusations. Following the publication of the article, one of the five New York City Council Republican members with links to the Young Republicans, Inna Vernikov, resigned and denounced the organization.

== See also ==
- College Republicans
- The New York Young Republican Club
- Republican Party (United States)
- Republicans Overseas
- Teen Age Republicans
- Turning Point USA
- Young Democrats of America
