= Index of politics articles =

Politics (from Ancient Greek πολιτικά (politiká) 'affairs of the cities') is the activity of settling affairs in an organized society. Politics is usually concerned with resolving issues within a society via a government. Politicians are individuals engaged in the activity of politics. The branch of social science that studies politics and government is referred to as political science.

== 0-9 ==
10 Agorot controversy - 1965 Yerevan demonstrations - 1984 network liberty alliance - 2006 Franco–Italian–Spanish Middle East Peace Plan - 2006 Georgian-Russian espionage controversy - 2006 Norwegian Jostein Gaarder controversy - 2006 United States immigration reform protests - 2007 Georgia helicopter attack incident - 2007 Georgia missile incident - 2007 Georgia plane downing incident -

== A ==
A Man's A Man for A' That - A Quaker Action Group - A Scientific Support for Darwinism - Abalone Alliance - Ableism - Abortion - Absentee ballot - Absolute majority - Absolute monarch - Absolute monarchy - Absolutism - Abstention - Acceptance - Acclamation - Active measures - Activism - Activism at Ohio Wesleyan University - Activism industry - Administrative Centre - Administrative resource - Adolf Hitler - Advocacy - Affair - Affinity group - Affirmative action - Affirmative action bake sale - African Plate - African socialism - Agrarianism - Agricultural policy - Alan Placa - Alexandre de Lameth - Alice's Meadow - Alta controversy - Alternative Views - Amalgamation (history) - Amalgamation (politics) - American Political Science Association - American Political Science Review - Americas - Americentric - Amoral - An Act of Conscience - An equal amount of products for an equal amount of labor - Anarchism - Anarchism in China - Anarchist communism - Anarcho-capitalism - Anarcho-primitivism - Anarcho-syndicalism - Anatopia - Ancien Régime - Ancien régime - Ancient Greece - Animal rights - Animal testing - Annexation - Anthropology - Anti-Capitalist Convergence - Anti-Communism - Anti-nuclear movement - Anti-nuclear movement in Australia - Anti-nuclear movement in Germany - Anti-nuclear movement in the United States - Anti-Poverty Committee - Anti-Revisionist - Anti-Stalinist left - Anti-authoritarian - Anti-capitalism - Anti-clericalism - Anti-communism - Anti-cult movement - Anti-environmentalism - Anti-incumbency - Anti-nationalism - Anti-work - Antidisestablishmentarianism - Antimilitarism - Antinaturalism (politics) - Antoine Barnave - Apolitical - Aptitude - Arab socialism - Arbetarnas bildningsförbund - Arbeter Ring (Workmen's Circle) - Arctic Refuge drilling controversy - Arendt, Hannah - Aristocracy - Aristotelianism - Aristotle - Arizona State University - Arm's length principle - Arms-length management organisation - Arrow Cross Party - Arthashastra - Artists United Against Apartheid - Artivist - Asian values - Assembly of the Poor - Asset-based egalitarianism - Atrocity story - Audre Lorde Project - Augustine of Hippo - Augustus - Ausserparlamentarische Opposition - Australasia - Australia - Austria - Autarchism - Authoritarian - Authoritarianism - Authority - Autism Awareness Campaign UK - Autism Society of America - Autism Speaks - Autonomous area - Average worker's wage - Averroes - Aviation ministry - Avicenna - Awards - Axis of Justice

== B ==
BCE - Babels - Babeuf - Balanced job complex - Ballot - Ballot access - Ballot box - Ballot stuffing - Barbara Kay controversy - Bavaria - Bavarian Soviet Republic - Behavioralism - Beirut-Damascus Declaration - Belgian Labour Party - Bellum omnium contra omnes - Benito Mussolini - Berne International - Bible - Bicameralism - Bipartisanship - Black Front - Black Panther Party - Black populism - Black supremacy - Board of Control (municipal government) - Bob Dornan - Body politic - Bolivarian Revolution - Bolshevik - Bourgeoisie - Brahmana - Brandeis University - Brights movement - British politics - Brown Berets (Watsonville) - Buddhism - Buddhist socialism - Bureau-shaping model - Bureaucracy - Bureaucrat - Bureaucratic drift - Burmese Way to Socialism - Butskelism - By-election

== C ==
Cabotage - Cacerolazo - Caging list - Calculus of voting - Californians Aware - Call For Action - Camp Trans - Camp for Climate Action - Campaign for Innocent Victims in Conflict - Canal Contemporâneo - Candidate - Capital - Capital punishment - Capitalism - 1920 Carinthian plebiscite - Carneiro's circumscription theory - Carnival Against Capital - Carthaginian peace - Cartographic aggression - Catholic - Celine's laws - Censorship - Center for American Politics and Citizenship - Center for Biological Diversity - Center for Freedom and Prosperity - Center for Science in the Public Interest - Center for the Evaluation of Risks to Human Reproduction - Centrist - Chambers of parliament - Champagne socialist - Chanakya - Chandragupta Maurya - Chappaquiddick incident - Charismatic authority - Cherokee Freedmen - Child advocacy - China watcher - Chinaman (politics) - Chinese people - Christian democracy - Christian Institute - Christian democracy - Christian existentialism - Christian socialism - Christianity - Christians - The Chronicle of Higher Education - Chuch'e - Church and state - Cicero - Citizens' jury - Citizenship - City-state - Civil authority - Civil libertarianism - Civil liberties - Civil registry - Civil service - Civil society - Civil society campaign - Civilian control of the military - Civilized - Clandestine Insurgent Rebel Clown Army - Clare Boothe Luce Policy Institute - Class conflict - Class struggle - Classical liberalism - Classless society - Clean Clothes Campaign - Cleavage (politics) - Clergy Letter Project - Clone (voting) - Co-option - Coalition for Comprehensive Immigration Reform - Coercion - Colby College - Cold War - Collective action - Collective responsibility - Collectivism and individualism - College of William & Mary - Colonialism - Command and Control (government) - Commercial Club of Chicago - Committee - Common Purpose UK - Common minimum programme - Commonwealth of World Citizens - Communalism - Communism - Communist - Communitarianism - Communities Organized for Public Service - Community Front in Defense of Land - Community organizing - Communization - Compact theory - Comparative government - Comparative politics - Competitiveness Policy Council - Compulsory purchase order - Compulsory voting - Concession (politics) - Concord Principles - Concurrent majority - Condominium (international law) - Conference of Socialist Economists - Confidence and supply - Confucius - Congress - Congress of Vienna - Congressional Order of Merit - Conscription - Consent of the governed - Conservatism - Conservatism in Colombia - Conservatism in the United States - Consistent life ethic - Conspiracy (political) - Constituency - Constitutional convention (political meeting) - Constitutional crisis - Constitutional dictatorship - Constitutional patriotism - Constitutionalism - Consul general - Consumer organization - Consumers' Association - Consumers' Research - Contact Group (Balkans) - Contempt of Parliament - Contentious politics - Continental Europe - Controversies related to Islam and Muslims - Coordination failure - Cordón Industrial - Cornelius Castoriadis - Cornell College - Cornell University - Corporate Europe Observatory - Corporate nationalism - Corporate oligarchy - Corporate welfare - Corporation - Corrective Revolution - Cosmopolitanism - Council on American–Islamic Relations - Counter-recruitment - Counter-terrorism - CountyWatch - County executive - Courtesy resolution - Craftivism - Crisis management - Critical international relations theory - Criticisms of electoralism - Criticisms of socialism - Critique: Journal of Socialist Theory - Critique of capitalism - Cross-cultural studies - Cult of personality - Cultural hegemony - Culture - Culture jamming - Curvilinear disparity - Custom online panel - Cyberpolitics -

== D ==
DIY culture - Daniel Mark Siegel - Daniel Patrick Moynihan - Dartmouth College - De Maistre - Deanie Frazier - Debate - Debeaking - Declarationism - Declassification - Deduction - Defective by Design - Definitional concerns in anarchist theory - Delegate model of representation - Delegated voting - Delegation - Deliberative democracy - Demand management - Demarchy - Democracy - Democracy Day (United States) - Democracy building - Democracy in Marxism - Democracy in the Middle East - Democratic confederalism- Democratic Socialist Organizing Committee - Democratic Socialists of America - Democratic peace theory - Democratic socialism - Democratic transhumanism - Demonstration (people) - Demos (U.S. think tank) - Demzilla - Denialism - Dependent territory - Deposition (politics) - Designated Suppliers Program - Detournement - Dialectic - Diaspora politics - Dichotomy - Digital era governance - Digital object identifier - Diplomacy - Direct Action and Democracy Today - Direct action - Direct democracy - Direct rule over Northern Ireland - Disability Determination Services - Disarm bush - Disarmament - Dissent! (network) - Distributism - Divine Right of Kings - Dominant-party system - Donald Trump - Downhill Battle - Downsize DC Foundation - Drug policy - Drug policy reform - Dual loyalty - Dual mandate - Dual power - Duumviracy - Dyke March - Dykes on Bikes -

== E ==
E. J. Josey - Early voting - Earthlings (documentary) - East Gosforth - Eco-socialism - Ecodefense - Economic activism - Economic calculation problem - Economic interventionism - Economic liberalism - Economics - Economic democracy - Economy - Ecotage - E-democracy - Edmund Burke - Education - Education Action Group - Education Otherwise - Education policy - Education reform - Egalitarianism - Egalitarianism as a Revolt Against Nature and Other Essays - Egyptian Socialist Youth Organization - Election - Election (1999 film) - Election Day (United Kingdom) - Election Day Registration - Election judge - Election law - Election management body - Election monitoring - Election surprise - Elections - Elector - Electoral Reform Society - Electoral calendar 2009 - Electoral college - Electoral fusion - Electoral geography - Electoral power - Electoral reform - Electoralism - Electorate - Electronic civil disobedience - Electronic politics - Elitism - Elitist - Emergent democracy - Empirical - Empiricism - Employment - Enabling act - Enclave and exclave - Energy security - England - Environmentalism - Epistemology - Equality before the law - Equality of opportunity - Equality of outcome - Eric Hoffer - Eskalera Karakola - Ethical challenges to autism treatment - Ethics - Ethnic nationalism - Ethnopluralism - Etoy - Euripides - Europe - Europeans of the Year - Exclusive mandate - Executive (government) - Executive branch - Executive order (United States) - Executive power - Exit poll - Expansionism - Expansionist Nationalism -

== F ==
Factual association - Fahrenheit 9/11 controversy - Family - Fanorama - Fantasy Congress - Farband - Farley File - Fasci Siciliani - Fascio - Fascism - Fascism as an international phenomenon - Fascist - Father of the House - Favourite - Federal Returning Officer - Federalism - Feminism - Ferdowsi - Fernand Brouez - Feuillant - Fiscal conservatism - Five-point electoral law - Fixed-term election - Foco - Folkhemmet - Food politics - For a New Liberty: The Libertarian Manifesto - Foreign policy - Foreign policy analysis - France - Franchise activism - Free Software Foundation - Free market - Free migration - Free the Old Head of Kinsale - Freedom (political) - Freedom of speech - Freedom of the press - French Constitution of 1793 - French Constitution of 1795 - French Directory - French Fifth Republic - French Revolution - French Senate - Front-runner - Fu Xiancai - Fudgie Frottage - Full slate - Functionalism in international relations - Funky Dragon -

== G ==
G. William Domhoff - Galicianism (Galicia) - Game theory - Gandhian economics - Gastald - Gaullism - Gay marriage - Gay rights - General election - Generalissimo - Generation Engage or GenerationEngage - Geopolitics - George Allen (U.S. politician) - George Lakoff - Georgetown University - Georgism - Gerard Toal - German student movement - Germanophile - Get Up, Stand Up: The Story of Pop and Protest - Girondins - Girondist - Glenn W. Smith - Global Environment and Trade Study - Global Justice (organization) - Global Justice Movement - Global citizens movement - Global politics - Global power barometer - Globalism - Globalization - Glossary of the French Revolution - Godless Americans March on Washington - Golden Liberty - Goodhart's law - Goulash Communism - Governance - Government - Government-organized demonstration - Government Gazette of South Africa - Government in exile - Government procurement - Government simulation game - Grapus - Grassroots Radio Coalition - Great American Boycott - Great Britain - Great power - Green anarchism - Green lending - Green liberalism - Green politics - Green syndicalism - Greenpeace - Guardian of Zion Award - Guevarism - Guided Democracy - Gun control - Gun rights -

== H ==
Hacktivism - Hacktivismo - Haldane principle - Handover - Hannah Arendt - Harvard University - Haymarket Books - He who does not work, neither shall he eat - Head of state succession - Heads of state - Health politics - Health care politics - Health care reform - Health department - Hegemonic stability theory - Hendrix College - Herbert Baxter Adams - Hereditary Education Policy - Herzl Award - Hesiod - Hierarchical organization - High politics - Hillary Rodham cattle futures controversy - Hindi-Urdu controversy - Hindmarsh Island bridge controversy - Hindu nationalism - Hindutva - Historical institutionalism - History - History of India - History of democracy - History of fundamentalist Islam in Iran - History of political science - History of socialism - History of terrorism - Hobbes - Home Nations - Homer - Householder Franchise - Hudson Guild - Human chain - Human geography - Human settlement - Human shield - Human shield action to Iraq - Hung parliament - Hunt Saboteurs Association - Husting - Hypatus -

== I ==
Icarus Project - Idealism in international relations - Ideologies of parties - Ideology - Identity politics - Ilısu Dam Campaign - Immigration policy - Immigration reduction - Immigration reform - In His Steps - Inclusive Democracy - Income redistribution - Independence - Independence referendum - Independent Australian Jewish Voices - Independent Media Center - India - Indirect election - Individualist anarchism - Indophile - Industrialisation - Indybay - Infighting - Information science - Inge Scholl - Initiative - Innovation - Institute for Global Communications - Institute for Humane Studies - Institutional analysis - Integral Nationalism - Integral humanism - Inter-Parliamentary Union - Interest aggregation - Interest articulation - Intergovernmental - Internal security - International Action Center - International Falcon Movement - International Foundation for Electoral Systems International Socialist Organization - International Solidarity Movement - International Working Union of Socialist Parties - International law - International relations - International relations theory - International trade - Internationalism (politics) - Internet censorship - Internet taxation - Intersectionality - Invisible Party - Ion Sancho (politician) - Iraq and Afghanistan Veterans of America - Irish Socialist Network - Islamic - Islamic Thinkers Society - Islamic state - Islamism - Island country - Isolationism - Israeli–Palestinian conflict - Italy -

== J ==
Jamahiriya - James E. Hansen - Jamil Hussein controversy - Jan Wong controversy - Japanese Imperial succession controversy - Jean-Jacques Rousseau - Jean Schmidt - Jeffersonian political philosophy - Jerusalem Center for Public Affairs - Jesus Ledesma Aguilar - Jewish Socialists' Group - John Carver (board policy) - John Locke - John Mordaunt Trust - John Rawls - John Stuart Mill - Johns Hopkins University - Joint electorate - Joint session - Joseph Stalin - Juche - Judicial - Judicial activism - Judicial branch - Judicial power - Judicial tyranny - Judiciary - Julius Caesar - Junge Wilde - Junta (Habsburg) - Junta (Peninsular War) - Jura federation - Jurisdiction - Justice at Stake Campaign -

== K ==
Karl Marx - Karl Popper - Keep Ireland Open - Keynesian economics - Kingdom of Sardinia - Klemens von Metternich - Korean Immigrant Workers Advocates - Kremlinology -

== L ==
La Reunion (Dallas) - Labor Zionism - Labour Party (UK) - Labour law - Labour movement - Labour voucher - Laissez-faire - Laissez-faire capitalism - Laissez faire - Lake Ontario Waterkeeper - Land reform - Landmine Survivors Network - Landslide victory - Lange Model - Language policy - Law - Law and order (politics) - Law collective - Law making - Lawrence O'Brien Award - Leaderless resistance - League (politics) - League of Coloured Peoples - Left-Right politics - Left-Wing Communism: An Infantile Disorder - Left-right politics - Left-wing - Left-wing politics - Left wing - Legal domination - Legal research - Legal system - Legislative - Legislative Assembly (France) - Legislative branch - Legislative power - Legislative veto - Legislative violence - Legislature - Legitimating ideology - Lenin - Les Dégonflés - Leviathan - Leviathan (book) - Liberal - Liberal democracy - Liberalism - Liberalism in Colombia - Liberalism in the United States - Liberals - Liberation theology - Libertarian Marxism - Libertarian Party of Michigan - Libertarian Socialism - Libertarian socialism - Libertarianism - Libertarians - Liberty - Line-item veto - Linestanding - Linguistics - Liquid democracy - Lishenets - List of government ministries by country - List of political scientists - Liverpool Social Forum - Livy - Local Works - Local government - Local self-government - Localism - Localism (politics) - London School of Economics - Louis XVIII - Luck egalitarianism - Luxemburgism -

== M ==
MVDDS dispute - Machiavellianism - Macmillan Publishers - Maimonides - Maine Video Activists Network - Majoritarianism - Majority - Malicious compliance - Management - Mandate (politics) - Mao Zedong - Maoism - Margaret Thatcher - Marginal seat - Marijuana Policy Project - Market populism - Market socialism - Marriage gap - Marxism - Marxism-Leninism - Marxist international relations theory - Marxist philosophy - Marxist revisionism - Mass mobilization - Mass politics - Massachusetts Institute of Technology - Maternity Coalition - Matriarchy - Maurya Empire - Max Weber - Maximilien Robespierre - May Conspiracy - May Day - Mayday Mutual Aid Medical Station - Means of production - Media activism - Medical marijuana - Melanesia - Melanesian socialism - Mercantilism - Merchants Club - Metapolitics - Metropolitan municipality - Miami model - Micronesia - Middle Ages - Mierscheid Law - Mike Lesser - Militant - Militarism - Military geography - Minarchism - Minimal effects hypothesis - Minimum wage - Ministry (collective executive) - Ministry (government department) - Minoritarianism - Minorities - Miscegenation - Mission-based organization - Mobutism - Mock election - Modern American liberalism - Monarchism - Monarchy - Monash University - Money bill - Monkeywrenching - Montebello High School flag flipping incident, 2006 - Moral Politics - Moral high ground - Moral philosophy - Morality - Motion of no confidence - Motyl's Theory of the Empire - Mount Holyoke College - MoveOn.org ad controversy - Movement for a New Society - Multi-party system - Multiculturalism - Municipal corporation - Municipal services - Music and politics - Muslim Association of Britain - Muslim Public Affairs Committee UK - Muslim Public Affairs Council - Māori protest movement -

== N ==
NATO expansion - NLRB election procedures - NY Salon - Name recognition - Nancy Program - Napoleon Bonaparte - Nasserism - Nation - Nation-state - National Action Party (Mexico) - National Alliance on Mental Illness - National American Woman Suffrage Association - National Assembly - National Assembly of France - National Association of Old IRA - National Association of Railroad Passengers - National Association of Secretaries of State - National Bolshevism - National Breast Cancer Awareness Month - National Civic League - National Convention - National Korean American Service & Education Consortium - National League of Cities - National Maternity Action Plan - National Organization for the Reform of Marijuana Laws - National Priority Projects - National Security Whistleblowers Coalition - National Socialist Program - National Vaccine Information Center - National Youth Rights Association - National heritage area - National language - National socialism - Nationalism - Natural rights - Nature versus nurture - Nazi - Nazism - Neo-Gramscianism - Neo-Zionism - Neo-medievalism - Neo-populism - Neoconservatism - Neoliberalism - Neoliberalism (international relations) - Neomercantilism - Neosocialism - Netherlands - Netroots - Nevada Desert Experience - New Democracy - New Jersey Redistricting Commission - New Left - New Politics (magazine) - New Revolutionary Alternative - New York University - Newt Gingrich - Niccolò Machiavelli - No Border network - Noam Chomsky - Nolan Chart - Nolan chart - Nominating committee - Nomination rules - Non-governmental organizations - Non-human electoral candidates - Non-intervention - Non-partisan democracy - Nonproliferation - Nonviolence - Nonviolence International - Norberto Bobbio - Norm Peterson (politician) - Normative - North America - Northeast Action - Northern Arizona University - Nothing About Us Without Us - Nothing But Nets - Nuclear-Free Future Award - Nuclear testing -

== O ==
Objectivism and libertarianism - Occidental College - Occupation (protest) - Ochlocracy - Office politics - Official language - Old right - Oligarchy - Omaha Platform - On Liberty - One People's Project - Open campaign - Open government - Open politics - Opposition (politics) - Opposition to immigration - Orange Revolution Originalism - Osman Ahmed Osman - Ostracism - Outer Continental Shelf - Outing - Outlying territory -

== P ==
PIANZEA - Pacific Environment - Pacifism - Pale - Paleoconservatism - Paleolibertarianism - Palestine Media Watch - Pali Canon - Parachute candidate - Paradox of voting - Parent-teacher association - Parents and citizens - Parity of esteem - Parliamentary informatics - Parliamentary session - Parochialism - Participatory economics - Participatory politics - Partition (politics) - Partners in Population and Development - Partnership for a Drug-Free America - Party-line vote - Party platform - Party political broadcast - Party system - Passive obedience - Patriarchy - Patriotism - Peace and conflict studies - Peace studies - Peace walk - Peacefire - People's Justice Party (UK) - Pbbeople & Planet - Peronism - Pete Stark - Peter F. Paul - Peterloo Massacre - Petticoat affair - Pharaonism - Pharisees - PharmFree - Philosopher - Philosophical anarchism - Philosophy - Philosophy, Politics, and Economics - Pi Sigma Alpha - Pieing - Plato - Plumi - Plutarch - Pochvennichestvo - Policy - Policy analysis - Policy by press release - Policy studies - Polish American Congress - Polish American Congress of Eastern Massachusetts - Political Campaigning - Political Management - Political activism - Political agenda - Political authorities - Political behavior - Political bias - Political campaign - Political campaign staff - Political capital - Political communications - Political compass - Political corruption - Political crime - Political criticism - Political culture - Political decoy - Political dissent - Political economy - Political entrepreneur - Political faction - Political game - Political geography - Political history - Political institution - Political labels - Political libel - Political literacy - Political media - Political movement - Political participation - Political parties - Political parties of the world - Political party - Political philosophy - Political power - Political psychology - Political rights - Political science - Political scientist - Political simulation - Political socialization - Political sociology - Political spectacle - Political spectrum - Political statement - Political symbolism - Political system - Political systems - Political t-shirt - Political theatre - Political theology - Political theory - Political unitarism - Politically exposed person - Politician - Politicization - Politicization of science - Politico - Politico-media complex - Politics - Politics (Aristotle) - Politics (disambiguation) - Politics by country - Politics by subdivision - Politics in fiction - Polity - Polling station - Pollster - Polybius - Polynesia - Popular socialism - Popularism - Populism - Porkbusters - Positive (social sciences) - Positive political theory - Post-democracy - Post-modern - Post-structuralist - Post-war consensus - Postal voting - Postmodern - power broker - Power in international relations - Power transition theory - Power vacuum - Prague Party Conference - Pre-Marx socialists - Prebendalism - President's Council on Service and Civic Participation - President-elect - Presidential succession - Prime Minister - Princeton Project 55 - Princeton University - Principate - Private defense agency - Private property - Privatization - Pro-life - Pro-war - Pro forma - Probing amendment - Productive forces - Progg - Progress For America - Progressive Era - Progressivism - Project Camelot - Project Cybersyn - Proletarian internationalism - Proletarian revolution - Proletariat - Prometheus Radio Project - Promoting adversaries - Pronunciamiento - Property rights - Protest - Protest vote - Provisional ballot - Proxy voting - Prussia - Psephology - Psychogeography - Psychology - Public Health Security and Bioterrorism Preparedness Response Act - Public administration - Public benefit corporation - Public law - Public management - Public opinion - Public participation - Public policy - Public property - Public sector - Public trust - Public value - Publics - Publixtheatre Caravan - Punk ideologies - Pure race - Purple Rain Protest -

== Q ==
Queeruption - Quick count - Quota Borda system -

== R ==
R. Doug Lewis - RISE International - Race relations - Racial segregation - Racist - Radical cheerleading - Radical democracy - Radicalism (historical) - Radicalization - Radium Girls - Rainbow/PUSH - Reactionary - Realigning election - Realism in international relations - Recall election - Red-baiting - Red Falcons - Red Guard Party (United States) - Red flag (politics) - Red inverted triangle - Redbud Woods controversy - Redistribution of wealth - Referendum - Reflections on the Revolution in France - Reformism - Refusal to serve in the Israeli military - Refuse and Resist - Refused ballot - Regenesis Movement - Regime - Regional autonomy - Regional hegemony - Regional state - Regionalism - Religion - Religious Coalition for Reproductive Choice - Religious socialism - Renaissance - Rent strike - Representative democracy - Representativity - Republic of China - Republican In Name Only - Republican Party (United States) - Republicanism - Reserved political positions - Returning Officer - Reverb (non-profit) - Reverse discrimination - Revisionist Zionism - Revolution - Revolution from above - Revolutionary Knitting Circle - Revolutionary movement - Revolutionary socialism - Revolutions of 1848 - Rhythms of Resistance - Richard Carmona - Richard L. Hasen - Rig-Veda - Right-wing - Right-wing politics - Right of conquest - Right of foreigners to vote - Right socialism - Right wing - Rights - Rights and responsibilities of marriages in the United States - Rise of nationalism in Europe - Rita Borsellino - Robert Dahl - Robert F. Thompson - Robert Filmer - Robert Stewart, Viscount Castlereagh - Roemer Model of Political Competition - Roman Empire - Roman Republic - Ronald Reagan - Roosevelt Institution - Root Force - Rosenberg Fund for Children - Rotvoll controversy - Royal Commission - Royal Commissions Act 1902 - Rubaiyat of Omar Khayyam - Ruling clique - Rump organization - Russian Procurement - Russian Revolution of 1917 -

== S ==
Sabotage - Sadducees - Safe seat - Safer Alternative for Enjoyable Recreation - Samhita - Samuel Gompers - Sangonet - Santorum controversy - Satiric misspelling - School of the Americas Watch - Science, Technology, & International Affairs - Science for the People - Science policy - Scientific Socialism - Scottish Politician of the Year - Seat of government - Seaweed rebellion - Secret ballot - Section 28 - Sectionalism - Secularism - Security and Peace - Self-determination - Senate Document - Separate electorate - Separation of church and state - Separation of powers - Separatism - Settler colonialism - Sexual Freedom League - Shadow Cabinet - Shadow Minister - Signoria of Florence - Simple majority - Single-issue politics - One-party state - Sinistrisme - Sister Boom-Boom - Sister Roma - Sitdown strike - Situational ethics - Skinheads Against Racial Prejudice - Slacktivism - Slavophile - Small-l libertarianism - Smith College - Social-imperialism - Social Credit - Social Solidarity - Social class - Social contract - Social democracy - Social democratic - Social democrats - Social fascism - Social liberalism - Social philosophy - Social policy - Social psychology - Social science - Social sciences - Social sector - Social welfare provision - Socialism - Socialism (book) - Socialism and LGBT rights - Socialism and social democracy in Canada - Socialism of the 21st century - Socialist Action (disambiguation) - Socialist Legality - Socialist Register - Socialist Resistance - Socialist Review (US) - Socialist Studies (1981) - Socialist Worker (Aotearoa) - Socialist competition - Socialist economics - Socialist feminism - Socialist law - Socialist realism - Socialist state - Society - Sociology - Soft despotism - Soft paternalism - Sokwanele - Somaly Mam Foundation - Songun - Sortition - Sound truck - South America - South End Press - Southeast Asian Leaders - Southern Agrarians - Southwest Asia - Sovereign - Sovereign state - Sovereignty - Soviet (council) - Soviet Union - Soviet democracy - Soviet republic (system of government) - Space policy - Spanish Constitution of 1812 - Speaker of the Senate - Spokescouncil - Stalinism - Stand Up Speak Up - Starve the beast - State (polity) - State Electoral Office - State of emergency - State of nature - State socialism - Stateless nation - Statistics - Statoid - Stem cell - Stem cell controversy - Stephanie Cutter - Steven Lukes - Strategic Urban Planning - Strategic geography - Strategic planning - Street-level bureaucracy - Street protester - Strength through Peace - Student Activity Fee - Student Global AIDS Campaign - Student activism - Student voice - Students Partnership Worldwide - Students for Justice in Palestine - Stump speech (politics) - Substantive representation - Suffrage - Sultanism - Summer capital - Supermajority - Superpower - Supranational - Supranational aspects of international organizations - Supremacism - Surveillance state - Susan Bernecker - Sustainable procurement - Swing vote - Swingometer - Syncretic politics - Synonyms - Systematic ideology - Systems theory in political science -

== T ==
TV turnoff - Tactical media - Tactical politics - Taistoism - Taiwan - Take Pride in America - Takshashila University - Talk About Curing Autism - Tax Justice Network - Tax increment financing - Tax reform - Technology and society - Tellurocracy - Temporary capital - Tenant-in-chief - Territorial peace theory - Territory (country subdivision) - Terrorism - Tetracameralism - Thalassocracy - The Age of Enlightenment - The Analects of Confucius - The Communist Manifesto - The Denver Principles - The Internationale - The Lawless State - The Legislative Assembly and the fall of the French monarchy - The Lysistrata Project (protest) - The Masque of Anarchy - The Mischief Makers - The Mountain - The People Speak - The Prince - The Ragged Trousered Philanthropists - The Republic - The Social Contract - The Soul of Man under Socialism - The Triple Revolution - The Two Souls of Socialism - Theocracy - Theology - Theories of political behavior - Theories of state - Thermidorian Reaction - Thessaloniki bombings of 1903 - Think tank - Third-worldism - Thomas Boddington - Thomas Hobbes - Thomas Sowell - Three-cornered-contest - ThreeBallot - Three Principles of the People - Three powers of the State - Thucydides - Ticket (election) - Ticket splitters - Timarchy - Timeline of women's rights (other than voting) - Timeline of women's suffrage - To the Finland Station - Tory Socialism - Totalitarian - Totalitarianism - Townsite - Trade facilitation - Traditional domination - Traffic light coalition - Transitology - Transparency (humanities) - Transparency International - Transpartisan - Treatment Advocacy Center - Tree pinning - Tree sitting - Tree spiking - Trent Lott - Trial (law) - Tricameralism - Tripartite classification of authority - Triple oppression - Tully Satre - Turkey - Turkey Youth Union - Turn Your Back on Bush - Turner Controversy - Twilight Club - Two-party system - Two Treatises of Government - Types of socialism - Tyranny - Tyrant -

== U ==
U.S. Committee for Human Rights in North Korea - UK Social Centre Network - Ukraine without Kuchma - Unaffiliated voter - Underground Literary Alliance - Unicameralism - Unilateral disarmament - Union Calendar - Unitary state - United Kingdom - United States - United States-Russia mutual detargeting - United States Republican Party presidential nomination, 2008 - United States Supreme Court - United We Stand America - Universal health care - Universal manhood suffrage - Universal suffrage - University of California, Santa Cruz - University of Essex - University of Idaho - University of Puget Sound - University of Sydney - University of Texas at Austin - University of Ulster - University reform in Argentina - Up with People - Uranium mining controversy in Kakadu National Park - Urban75 - Uribism - Urmia Manifesto of the United Free Assyria - Ursinus College - Use of Sciences Po - Ürün- Utah League of Cities and Towns - Utopia - Utopian socialism -

== V ==
VDARE - Vanguard party - Vanguardism - Vanishing mediator - Varieties of democracy - Veterans of Future Wars - Veto - Vice Consul - Victoria University of Wellington - Villagization - Virgil Goode - Virginians Against Drug Violence - Virtue - Vladimir Lenin - Vote allocation - Vote counting system - Vote pairing - Votebank - Voter database - Voter fatigue - Voter registration - Voter turnout - Voting - Voting bloc - Voting machine - Voting system - Voting systems -

== W ==
WOMBLES - Wage labour - Wage slavery - Wages - War - War on terror - Ward Churchill 9/11 essay controversy - Washington and Lee University - Water fluoridation controversy - Week of Silence - Welfare reform - West Gosforth - West Side Nut Club - Western Journalism Center - Which? - Whip (politics) - Whirl-Mart - White-collar worker - White Poppy - White nationalism - White separatism - White supremacy - Whitewash (censorship) - Willard Saulsbury, Sr. - Winston Churchill - Wipeout (elections) - Women's suffrage - Women's suffrage in South Carolina - Women in politics - Women of Color Resource Center - Worker center - Workers' Awaaz - Workers' control - Workers' council - Workers' self-management - Working class - World's Smallest Political Quiz - World Network of Users and Survivors of Psychiatry - World War II - World cultures - World government - World revolution - Writ of election - Write-in candidate -

== X ==
Xenophon - Xenophobia -

== Y ==
YearlyKos - Young Lords - Young Socialist Alliance - Youth pride - Youth activism - Youth council - Youth politics - Youth vote - Yuan Baishun -

== Z ==
Zikism - Zionist Freedom Alliance - Zombie Lurch - Zvakwana -
