= EAG =

EAG may refer to:

== Science and medicine ==
- Electroantennography
- Estimated average glucose
- European Association of Geochemistry

== Transport ==
- Eagle Airways, a defunct New Zealand airline
- Eaglehawk railway station, in Victoria, Australia
- Eaglescliffe railway station, in England

== Other uses ==
- Ealing Art Group
- East Asian Games
- Education Action Group, in New Zealand
- Education Action Group Foundation, an American school choice advocacy group
- Effective Altruism Global, a series of annual philanthropy events that focus on the effective altruism movement
- En Avant de Guingamp, a French football club
- Eurasian Group, a member of the Financial Action Task Force on Money Laundering
- European Air Group
- European-Atlantic Group
- Extended affix grammar
