= Regenesis =

Regenesis or ReGenesis may refer to:

- Regeneration (biology), the regenesis of amputated or damaged cells, tissues or even organs.
- ReGenesis, a Canadian television series
- Regenesis (non-profit organization), an environmental group
- Regenesis (novel), by C. J. Cherryh
- ReGenesis (band), a Genesis tribute band
- X-Men: Regenesis, a Marvel Comics storyline
- Regenesis: How Synthetic Biology Will Reinvent Nature and Ourselves, a book by George M. Church
- Regenesis: Feeding the World Without Devouring the Planet, a 2022 book by George Monbiot
