= GPB =

GPB may refer to:

- Gazprombank, a Russian bank
- Georgia Public Broadcasting, the public broadcast network in the American state of Georgia
- Georgian Public Broadcaster, the national public broadcaster of the nation of Georgia
- Global power barometer
- Glossopharyngeal breathing
- Google Protocol Buffers, a method of serializing structured data
- GrandPooBear, a video game streamer
- Granny Peace Brigade, an American peace organizations
- Gravity Probe B, a satellite-based test of general relativity
- Grosse Pointe Blank, a 1997 American film
- Guarapuava Airport, in Brazil
