= Wrecking amendment =

Change to a bill intended to prevent its passage

In legislative debate, a wrecking amendment (also called a poison pill amendment or killer amendment) is an amendment made by a legislator who disagrees with the principles of a bill and who seeks to make it useless (by moving amendments to either make the bill malformed and nonsensical, or to severely change its intent) rather than directly opposing the bill by simply voting against it.

An important character of wrecking amendments is that they are not moved in good faith, that is, the proposer of the amendment would not see the amended legislation as good legislation and would still not vote in favour of the legislation when it came to the final vote if the amendment were accepted. Motives for making them include allowing more debate, delaying the enactment of the legislation, or oftentimes a direct attempt to convince the bill's legislator to withdraw said bill.

Some opponents of particular amendments will describe them as wrecking amendments because they regard the amendments as undermining the unity of the original proposal. Proponents of the amendment may seek to deny the charge by saying that the original proposal brings together different steps, and while personally they oppose all the parts, some parts are even worse than others and legislators should have an opportunity to consider them separately.

Wrecking amendments can pick up more votes than motions against, because observers tend to focus on who voted in favour and against the Bill in the final count, rather than looking at the amendments made during the passage through the legislature.

== Examples ==
- The Wyoming House of Representatives Committee of the Whole amended House Bill 0085, a proposal to study the state's emergency preparedness, in order to kill the bill. The amendment would have required the state to consider purchasing an aircraft carrier (even though Wyoming is a landlocked state), purchasing fighter jets, establishing a military, initiating a draft, and creating a currency. Also, the creation of a currency would violate the United States Constitution.
- The US Civil Rights Act of 1964 was amended at the last minute by Rep. Howard W. Smith of Virginia to make "sex" a protected class alongside race in employment opportunity. This was regarded as a wrecking amendment by those who thought that labor unions would oppose this proposal. The author of the bill claimed otherwise, and the Civil Rights Act ultimately passed with the amendment.

== See also ==
- Christmas tree bill
- Omnibus bill
- Probing amendment
- Rider (legislation)
