= Operation Arabian Knight =

Covert American anti-terrorism operation

On June 5, 2010, in a covert American anti-terrorism operation named "Operation Arabian Knight", two American citizens Mohamed Mahmood Alessa and Carlos "Omar" Eduardo Almonte, New Jersey residents, were arrested at Kennedy International Airport in New York City. The men were in the process of boarding booked, separate flights to Egypt. According to the affidavit filed in support of the federal criminal complaint, they planned to travel to Somalia to join Al-Shabab, an Al Qaeda-linked terrorist group recruiting foreigners for its civil war. They intended to join them in killing American troops in Somalia, although few Americans are stationed there. The two men were charged with conspiring to kill, maim, and kidnap people outside the U.S.

The arrests followed that of the American Faisal Shahzad, characterized as a home-grown terrorist and charged in the failed Times Square bombing.

The two men were denied bail, and a preliminary hearing was set for June 21 on the federal charges. On October 18, 2010, a federal judge gave their lawyers time to "attempt to finalize a plea agreement."

== Investigation ==
The covert investigation of the two, known as "Operation Arabian Knight", had begun in October 2006 as two separate probes after the FBI and New Jersey State Homeland Security detectives received separate tips about the two men. The agents named the operation after a reference in Alessa's computer records, in which he had said he and Almonte were "Arabian knights." The U.S. Foreign Intelligence Surveillance Court approved physical surveillance of the two men.

== Arrests ==
The two men checked in at John F. Kennedy International Airport and were preparing to board separate connecting flights to Cairo, Egypt, one the 6:30 p.m. Boeing 777 flight on Egyptair Flight 986 out of Terminal 4, the other a 9:55 p.m. Boeing 767 flight on Delta Air Lines Flight 84 out of Terminal 3. From there they planned to travel to Somalia by boat, to join Al-Shabab. The terminals, however, had a number of FBI agents and other members of the Joint Terrorism Task Force dressed as travelers.

Law enforcement officers allowed the men to get into the jetway boarding ramps before arresting them. Federal prosecutors had insisted that the men be allowed to go to the airport, and begin the boarding process, to limit the chance they could later say they had abandoned their plans. This also enabled the FBI agents to hear any last-minute phone calls the men might make before boarding their flights. Authorities arranged the arrests to take place out of sight of other passengers, to avoid panic. Authorities decided that the best place for each arrest would be at the end of the jetway, by the emergency door, and that cars would await the agents and suspects below.

As each suspect walked down the passageway from the gate to the plane, passengers behind him were held up. Out of sight of those on the plane and those waiting to board, each was confronted by federal agents. Alessa put up a fight, was pushed into a jetway wall, and suffered a red welt on his left temple and cuts on his face before he was handcuffed. Agents took him down the outside stairs to a waiting security car, and transported him to their facility. The 220-pound Almonte also reportedly resisted arrest, but was similarly apprehended.

The Joint Terrorism Task Force (JTTF) coordinated the arrests. JTTF agents were in place near the suspects' New Jersey homes before the arrests. As soon as the men were taken into custody, dozens of agents raided the two homes, taking away boxes of evidence. Federal counterterrorism officials said the investigation was ongoing, and that more arrests were anticipated.

== Suspects ==
The parents have characterized the men as "troublemakers" and school records of them document a history of behavioral problems, threats and violence.

=== Mohamed Mahmood Alessa ===
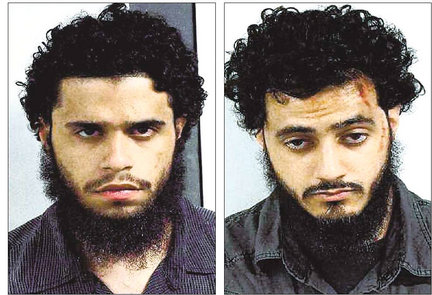
Carlos Eduardo Almonte (left), and Mohamed Mahmood Alessa (right)

Alessa was born in Jersey City, New Jersey, to Palestinian and Jordanian immigrant parents. He has dual United States-Jordanian citizenship, was living in North Bergen, New Jersey, and was 20 years old at the time of his arrest. After the September 11, 2001, attacks when other families on his block displayed American flags, his home hung a Palestinian flag. A neighbor, Luis Lainez, said: "not ... very patriotic, that puts up a red flag at the end of the day."

Alessa reportedly began to tell other children in his Boy Scout troop that Osama bin Laden was a hero in his family, and that he wanted to grow up to be a martyr. When other boys and their parents complained, he was asked to leave the group. As a teenager, he began to spend time with a gang who called themselves the P.L.O., after the Palestinian group, or the Arabian Knights.

Alessa's parents sent him for the ninth grade to the Al-Huda High School, a private Islamic religious high school in Paterson, New Jersey. He transferred to North Bergen High School in December 2004. Within three months, he was placed on administrative "home instruction," to be supervised by a security officer, because of "radicalized behavior that was very threatening," according to a school spokesman. In September 2005, he transferred to KAS Prep, an alternative high school for troubled youth in North Bergen, which he attended for one semester. He returned to North Bergen High School in March 2006. The school officials soon placed him on home instruction supervised by a security officer. Through 2005 and 2006, officials of both North Bergen and KAS Prep alerted the Department of Homeland Security about Alessa's escalating series of threats. The Islamic Center of East Orange asked for and received his transcript in October 2007, but it is not clear whether he attended the school.

Alessa attended Bergen Community College from the Spring of 2009 through the Spring of 2010. Officials at several schools described him as violent.

Neighbors thought he was an observant Muslim, though one said he had seen Alessa drink alcohol, which is prohibited. While his beard was generally long, Alessa occasionally shaved it off, according to the neighbor. His landlord said Alessa had visited Jordan about two years prior to his arrest, for six months.

Alessa reportedly said: "They only fear you when you have a gun and when you — when you start killing them, and when you — when you take their head, and you go like this, and you behead it on camera." He discussed carrying out a suicide bombing in the U.S., stating the "only way I would come back here is if I was in the land of jihad and the leader ordered me to come back here and do something here."

He allegedly would brandish a large knife and boast to family members about killing U.S. agents. Speaking of Nidal Malik Hasan, the US Army psychiatrist who killed 13 Americans at Fort Hood in 2009, Alessa said he would outdo him. According to court documents, he said: "A lot of people need to get killed, bro. Swear to God.... My soul cannot rest until I shed blood. I wanna, like, be the world's [best] known terrorist."

His mother said in his defense that "he's not a terrorist; he's a stupid kid."

=== Carlos "Omar" Eduardo Almonte ===
Almonte was born in Santiago in the Dominican Republic and came to the US with his family when he was five. He is a naturalized citizen, with joint U.S.-Dominican citizenship. He was 24 years old at the time of his arrest, and lived in Elmwood Park, New Jersey. He had graduated from Elmwood Park Memorial High School in 2005.

While in high school, he was arrested in 2004 both for aggravated assault, and for weapons possession.

After growing up as a Christian, Almonte converted to Islam in 2004 (against the wishes of his father), and visited mosques in Paterson, and Union City, New Jersey. He renamed himself "Omar", and met Alessa in 2005. In March 2007, the FBI conducted a consensual search of his computer, which contained documents advocating jihad.

His father was so disgusted with his son Carlos that he did not go to Almonte's hearing, saying: "I'm not supporting anybody that does something wrong."

==== "Death to all Juice" ====
Almonte had posted a photo on his Facebook page, holding a large placard that read, "Death to all Juice"(sic), which he displayed at the 2008 Israel Day Parade in New York City. At the time of its public release, the photo sparked a debate over whether the man was an illiterate anti-Semite, or a pro-Israel plant trying to make the protesters appear to be illiterate anti-Semites.

A supervisor at a New Jersey computer shop at which Almonte worked for more than a year said: "I'm telling you, this kid is not smart."

Pamela Hall, a NYC blogger, took a picture of Carlos Almonte on December 28, 2008, outside the Israeli Consulate in NYC. It was at the end of an anti-Israel protest march that started at Fifth Avenue and 50th street.

=== Collective activities ===
The two lived 12 miles (19 km) apart in New Jersey. They had been under FBI scrutiny since October 2006, when Alessa was still a teenager. A New York Police Department undercover officer recorded their discussions of their plans at a number of meetings.

The two reportedly traveled to Jordan in February 2007, where they tried without success to enter Iraq. According to Almonte, they tried unsuccessfully to become mujahedeen to fight against U.S. troops, and were "upset with the individuals who failed to recruit them".

According to the criminal complaint, they had practiced simulated combat at an outdoor paintball facility in West Milford, New Jersey. They had also engaged in tactical training, trained in hand-to-hand combat, and acquired military gear and combat apparel.

Prosecutors noted that the 11 men convicted in the Virginia Jihad Network had also used paintball training to simulate small-unit tactical operations. Officials noted that five Muslims later convicted of a plot to kill American soldiers at Fort Dix, New Jersey had also done paintball training.

Alessa and Almonte were followers of the Islamic Thinkers Society (ITS), a radical Islamist group based in New York that often holds joint events with Revolution Muslim. Both groups are offshoots of Al Muhajiroun, a pro-al Qaeda British Islamist extremist group. CNN posted a photo of the two men as part of a protest in New York City, a week before their arrests, which was organized by the Islamic Thinkers Society. During an ITS protest against the Israeli Day Parade in New York in May 2010, Alessa led an anti-Jewish chant. Alessa also attended ITS and RM rallies in Washington, D.C., in March 2010. He was recorded in videos standing next to Zachary Chesser. Chesser has since been arrested and charged for trying to join Al Shabaab in Somalia.

Regarding the U.S. soldiers overseas, Almonte reportedly said: "I just want the troops to come back home safely and cozily." "In body bags – in caskets," Alessa said. "In caskets," Almonte agreed. "Sliced up in a thousand pieces, cozy in the grave, in hell," added Alessa.

== Possible influences ==
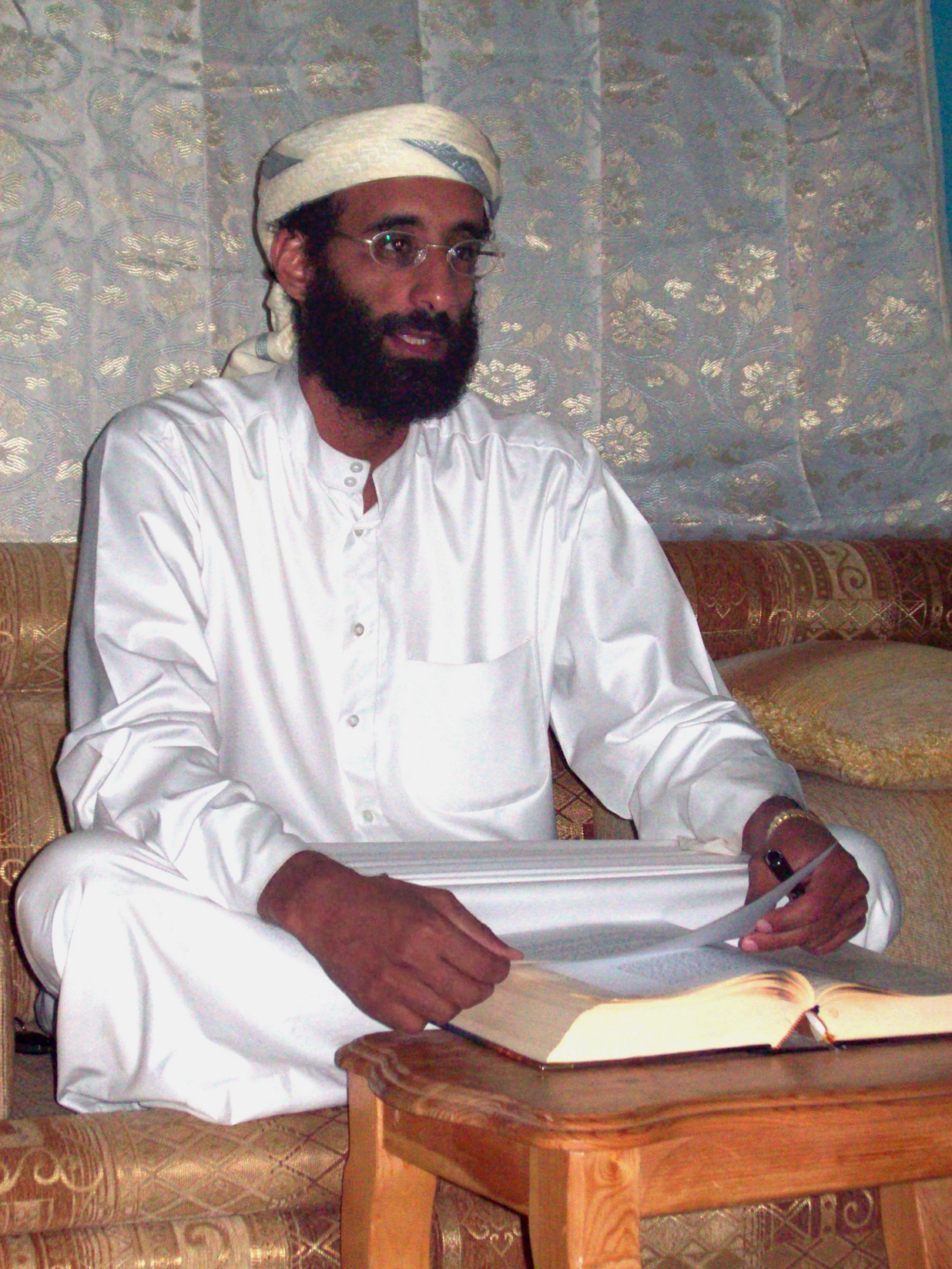
Anwar al-Awlaki, 2008

Authorities said the two New Jersey men had been followers of the American-born cleric, Anwar Al-Awlaki, known for increasing radicalism after 2006. The men were known to have watched video and audio recordings promoting violent jihad, including lectures by al-Awlaki, who is suspected of inciting Muslims to violence. Almonte reportedly kept an audio recording of al-Awlaki on his cell phone, in which al-Awlaki lectured about jihad and different types of martyrs, watched a jihadist video in which al-Awlaki justified the killing of civilians in jihad, and shared with others a pamphlet on jihad by al-Awlaki.

Al-Awlaki has praised the group, al-Shabab. Authorities said the two men were among a number of U.S. terrorism suspects inspired by al-Awlaki. He is believed to have helped inspire the 2009 Fort Hood shooting, the failed 2009 Christmas Day bombing, the failed 2010 Times Square bombing, and those convicted in the 2007 Fort Dix plot.

== Charges and plea negotiations ==
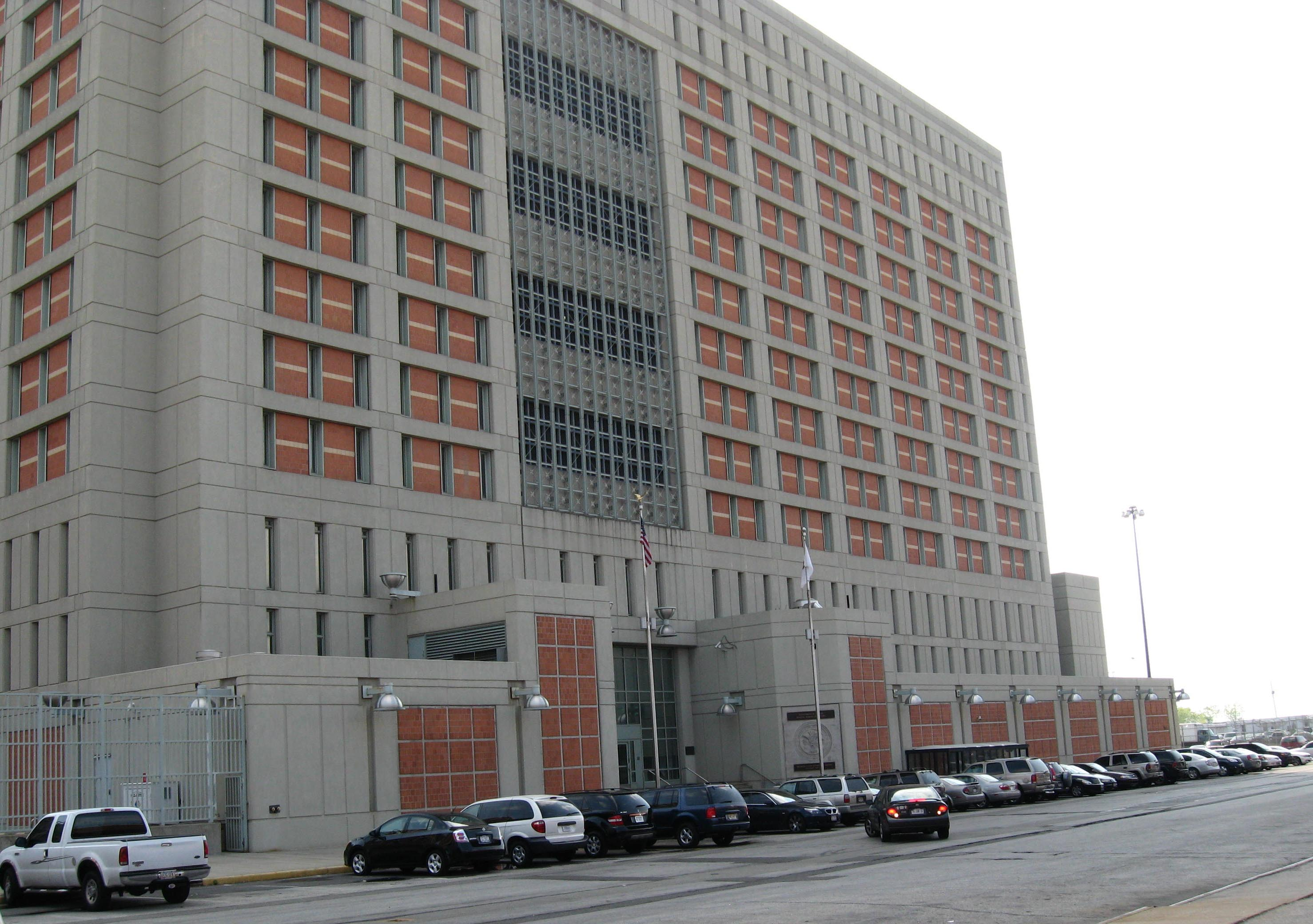
Brooklyn Metropolitan Detention Center

The suspects were charged with conspiring to kill, maim, and kidnap people outside the U.S. The same law has been used in the 2010 charging of Colleen LaRose, otherwise known as Jihad Jane. If convicted, they could each face a sentence of life in prison, and fines of up to $250,000. Federal prosecutors will reportedly seek life sentences in the case.

On June 7, 2010, the men appeared before Magistrate Judge Madeline Cox Arleo in the U.S. District Court for the District of New Jersey in Newark, New Jersey. Lawyers were appointed to represent them, and a bail hearing was scheduled for June 10, and a preliminary hearing for June 21 on the charges they face.

On June 10, Magistrate Arleo denied the two men bail, citing the seriousness of the charges against them, the credibility of the evidence, and the risk of flight. They are being held at the Brooklyn Metropolitan Detention Center.

On October 18, 2010, a federal judge gave their lawyers time to "attempt to finalize a plea agreement." In March 2011, they accepted a plea deal and admitted they wanted to try to join al-Shabab, an Al Qaeda-affiliated group and admitted they were part of a conspiracy to kill, maim, and kidnap.

== Related charges and guilty plea ==
Mohamed Osman, 19 years old, of Bayonne, New Jersey, pleaded guilty on September 15, 2010, before Senior U.S. District Judge Dickinson R. Debevoise making materially false statements to members of the FBI's Joint Terrorism Task Force who were investigating Alessa and Almonte. Osman had denied knowing about the two men's plans but later admitted that was a lie. He faced a potential eight years in jail and $250,000 fine at sentencing on December 20, 2010.

On June 20, 2013, Osman was sentenced to 18 months in federal prison.

On April 15, 2013, Mohamed Hamoud Alessa was sentenced to 22 years in prison, and Carlos Eduardo Almonte was sentenced to 20 years in prison.

== Al-Shabab ==
Al-Shabab flag

When arrested, the two men had planned to join the Islamic extremist group Al-Shabaab in Somalia. Al-Shabab was designated a terrorist group by the U.S. in 2008. It has several thousand militants, and claims ideological kinship with al-Qaeda. It recruits foreigners for its civil war in Somalia, not jihad. An estimated 20 Americans have joined it, of whom a dozen have been killed in Somalia, according to their friends and families. As a result, since 2007-2008, interest among Americans in the group has declined, according to analysts.

The group's Islamist ideology calls for punishments of amputations and public stonings for violations of Islamic law; their rule has been severe, prohibiting music and television, and the wearing of bras by women. Al-Shabab was also praised by Osama bin Laden prior to his death in May 2011. Its leaders have reputedly worked closely with terrorists of al-Qaeda in Yemen and Pakistan. It is thought to have harbored al-Qaeda terrorists responsible for the 1998 Kenya and Tanzania U.S. embassy bombings.

Sheik Abdirisaq Mohamed Qaylow, a spokesman for the Somalia Ministry of Information, welcomed the arrests of Alessa and Almonte, saying: "Foreign terrorists here are an obstacle to lasting peace in Somalia. So we welcome the move and we are calling on all governments to take such steps against al-Shabab and all terrorists at large".

== Reaction ==
Bernard Kerik, former New York City Police Commissioner from 2000 to 2001 and Secretary of Homeland Security nominee blogged that since 9/11, he and several others had predicted that "some of our greatest threats would eventually come from within, from home grown and naturalized citizens who were radicalized and hate this country", and that the arrests of Alessa and Almonte were an example of that.
