= Emergent democracy =

In politics, emergent democracy represents the rise of political structures and behaviors without central planning and by the action of many individual participants, especially when mediated by the Internet. It has been likened to the democratic system of ancient Greece in the sense that people could publicly participate as much or as little as they please, although a form of representation exists which is based on personal trust networks instead of party affiliations. More recently, American writer and researcher Clay Shirky has referred to this as "the power of organizing without organizations."

== Origin ==
Emergent democracy was coined to stand in contrast to more traditional forms of democracy, such as representative democracy and direct democracy. The phrase draws upon emergence theory for the idea that the simple actions of individuals can collectively create complex and unpredictable results, as when the behavior of termites results in large, efficient nests beyond the comprehension of any individual participant. Another analogy involves the way a slime mold, a single-celled organism, gathers together to form a super-organism within a specific condition (short supply of food). Emergent democracy is said to work the same way, that once people's minds are plugged into the system, collective signal triggers are revealed, resulting result to new ideas and a new way of looking at the world as these minds coalesce.

In the paper that first drew attention to the term, Joi Ito said that the Internet, as a large and decentralized network, will enable innovative responses by citizens to highly complex problems. He described a possibility - in the case of the Internet - to become a method that allows citizens to self-organize so that such problems can be deliberated on and addressed. From its outset, emergent democracy has been seen arising most clearly among bloggers who, as a decentralized network of writers, can provide a fuller airing and development of ideas than can the relatively limited resources of traditional media. Supporters of the idea point to instances in which bloggers have brought about political change by posting about issues that mainstream media had not paid much attention to. The canonical example of emergent democracy was the December 2002 resignation of Trent Lott as Senate majority leader after bloggers publicized his praising of Strom Thurmond's 1948 segregationist campaign for the presidency.

== Background ==
Ito had been vocal about issues with Japanese democracy, and had spoken at Davos about how broken he felt Japanese democracy was. "Afterwards, Ms. Ogata, the former UN High Commissioner for Refugees told me that I should stop ranting as a Japanese and think more about global democracy and global issues," he posted. "These words stuck with me and last year I tried to think about blogs and emergent democracy outside of the Japanese context." He organized a group effort to discuss and document the emergent democracy concept, using a term initially coined by Ross Mayfield. He announced meetings on his weblog, inviting his readers to attend a conference call that was augmented by IRC chat for posting realtime visual cues and backchannel conversation, and a wiki for gathering notes from the call. This "multimodal" approach was called a "happening" by Ross Mayfield. The conversation resulted in Ito's online article that generated discussions about the potential for weblogs and other social software tools to influence participation in governance. The discussion and notes were captured in a paper that was placed on a wiki for collaborative editing and enhancement. Jon Lebkowsky edited the wiki version, and published it as a chapter in the 2005 book Extreme Democracy. A "teach-in" on that topic was held on February 9, 2004, as part of the O'Reilly Emerging Technology Conference.

== See also ==
- List of politics-related topics
- Direct democracy
- E-democracy
- Open source governance
- Panarchy
- Second Superpower
