= Interest articulation =

Interest articulation is a way for members of a society to express their needs to a system of government. It can range from personal contact with government officials to the development of interest groups (e.g. trade unions, professional associations, religious groups) who act in the interest of larger groups of people. Interest articulation can have different effects in different types of government and can include both legal (i.e.: lobbying, peaceful protest, phone calls and letters to policymakers) and illegal activities (e.g. assassination, riots). Interest articulation leads to interest aggregation. According to Gabriel Almond Interest articulation are four types they are given below:-

The types of interest groups, as identified by Gabriel Almond, are:

Anomic Groups
generally spontaneous groups with a collective response to a particular frustration
Nonassociational Groups
rarely well organized and their activity is dependent upon the issue at hand. They differ from Anomic groups in that they are usually similar to one another and have a common identity.
Institutional Groups
mostly formal and have some other political or social function in addition to the particular interest.
Associational Groups
formed explicitly to represent an issue of a particular group.
