= Junta (Habsburg) =

Administrative body ruled in personal union with the Spanish Habsburgs

Under Habsburg rule, a junta (or jointe) was an administrative body ruled in personal union with the Spanish Habsburgs. Juntas existed in Spain, Italy, and other European countries; in the Low Countries, the French name jointe was also officially used. Some territories maintained their juntas even after being brought under the imperial Austrian branch of the dynasty.
