= Farband =

Farband may refer to:

- Yidisher Kultur Farband, YKUF, a.k.a. Jewish Culture Association, Communist-oriented organization founded 1937
- Yidish Natsionaler Arbeter Farband, NJWA, a.k.a. Jewish National Workers Alliance, Labor Zionist-oriented American Jewish organization
- Far (band)
- Sotsyalistishe Kinder Farband, SKIF
- Jewish Socialist Verband, a.k.a. Jewish Socialist Farband

== See also ==
- Verband
