= Nancy Program =

The Nancy Program was the party platform for the Nationalist Socialist Party in France in 1889.

It was written by Maurice Barrès, an elected deputy from the town of Nancy (in Lorraine), and is valuable as a representative statement of the outlook of the new Right in France at the turn of the 20th century. In The Nancy Program, Barrès advocates The New Right, supporting nationalism and socialism. The document exemplifies the xenophobia and antisemitism that was rampant in France at the time.
