= Veterans of Future Wars =

US satirical political organization (1936)

National Commander of the Veterans of Future Wars, Lewis Gorin Jr., as he appeared in 1936.

Veterans of Future Wars (VFW) was a satirical political organization initially created as a prank by Princeton University students in 1936. The group was conceived as a parody of the Veterans of Foreign Wars and the movement for early payment of a bonus to veterans of World War I that had been originally scheduled for disbursement in 1945 when the World War Adjusted Compensation Act was passed in 1924. The group jokingly advocated the payment of a similar $1,000 "bonus" (plus 30 years' of interest) to future veterans of a coming European conflagration while the recipients were young enough—and alive—to enjoy it.

The erstwhile parody organization became a national sensation, gaining upwards of 60,000 adherents on college campuses across the United States. The members nationwide were strongly anti-war and cared little for the anti-bonus motivation of the leaders, all of whom were Princeton students. The deep contradiction led to an overnight disintegration late in the 1936–37 academic year.

== Organizational history ==
=== Background ===
In March 1936, Princeton University roommates Lewis Gorin Jr. and Urban Rushton attended a movie at which they saw a newsreel reporting plans for an early payout of $2 billion in bonus money to veterans of World War I which had been originally scheduled for disbursement in 1945 as part of the World War Adjusted Compensation Act of 1924. The pair's sensibilities were offended that such a massive payout was being so readily granted by Congress in the midst of the Great Depression, due mostly to the lobbying efforts of special interest groups such as the Veterans of Foreign Wars (VFW) and the American Legion.

With war in the wind in Europe, the two collegians penciled out plans for a parody organization that would lobby for immediate payment of $1,000 "war bonuses" to every American man of military age, including 30 years of future interest—which would bring the total to $2,400—while they were still alive to cash the checks and young enough to enjoy the money. This organization would be known as the Veterans of Future Wars (VFW), in obvious parody of the national veterans organization using the same acronym since 1899.

The group's satirical manifesto, written by Lewis Gorin, explained the rationale for such a payment:

WHEREAS it is inevitable that this country will be engaged in war within the next thirty years, and

WHEREAS it is by all accounts likely that every man of military age will have a part in this war,

WE, THEREFORE, demand that the Government make known its intention to pay an adjusted service compensation, sometimes called a bonus, of $1,000 to every male citizen between the ages of 18 and 36, said bonus to be payable the first of June, 1965. Furthermore, we believe a study of history demonstrates that it is customary to pay all bonuses before they are due. Therefore we demand immediate cash payment, plus three per cent interest compounded annually and retroactively from the first of June, 1965, to the first of June, 1935. It is but common right that this bonus be paid now, for many will be killed or wounded in the next war, and hence they, the most deserving, will not otherwise get the full benefit of their country's gratitude ...

The group's manifesto also noted that American women would "suffer no less than the men in the coming strife" and therefore advocated immediate payment of a pension of "$50 per month during the remainder of their natural life" for "all mothers and future mothers of male children," via the Veterans of Future Wars' "Home Fire Division."

=== Local parody goes national ===
The satirical Princeton organization dreamed up by Gorin achieved national prominence through a well-timed press release. News of the tongue-in-cheek manifesto calling for cash "bonuses" and "pensions" to young men and women was picked up by the Associated Press, United Press International, and other wire services and spread coast-to-coast via the nation's daily newspapers. Taken seriously as part of the pacifist movement in some places and as political theater in others, within three weeks the new VFW was reporting the formation of more than 300 "posts" around the country, counting among their ranks some 25,000 members. Gorin quickly found himself renting an office in Princeton, New Jersey and hiring a secretary to deal with the mountain of correspondence generated by the spontaneous growth of the new organization.

The Veterans of Future Wars received its warmest reception from those students who saw the group as a mockery of the overblown patriotism and sense of entitlement of the military veterans' lobby and who saw the veterans lobby as advocates of militarism and an obstacle to peace. Local initiatives added layers of complexity to the VFW parody, with various college seminary students forming a Chaplains of Future Wars, while Cornell University engineering students launched a parallel group called the Future Munitions Workers. Further spinning the VFW concept were journalism students at Rutgers University who launched a pseudo-organization called Propagandists of Future Wars, others at City College of New York who gave birth to the Foreign Correspondents of Future Wars, and a women's group at Bennington College, which debuted the Future War Spinsters.

Gorin himself achieved national prominence, receiving multiple invitations as a speaker at events held by the vibrant anti-war movement of the day and later being remembered in his 1999 New York Times obituary as having briefly been "the most famous collegian in America who did not actually play football." Gorin was quick to capitalize on the publicity afforded him, rushing a short book called Patriotism Prepaid into print through the important Philadelphia publisher J. B. Lippincott & Co. just two months after the March 1936 launch of the VFW. Gorin's short work received serious reviews in major newspapers around the country, with the New York Herald Tribune proclaiming it "the best and grimmest joke of 1936."

Gorin proclaimed serious intent behind the satirical organization, declaring a hope that the VFW would be the vehicle by which the anti-war movement could "arrive at some plan to keep us out of the coming European War, but a plan which will appeal to isolationists, Jingoes, and pacifists" alike. Among the group's moral supporters was First Lady Eleanor Roosevelt, who declared the mock student organization "as funny as can be" and "taken light, as it should be—a grand pricking of lots of bubbles."

=== Criticism ===
The Veterans of Future Wars spoof was not without its critics. An early effort to form a women's auxiliary called the Future Gold Star Mothers at Vassar College caused a firestorm, with Vassar President Henry Noble MacCracken denouncing the proposed group as a "breach of good taste" and prohibiting campus organizer Marys Converse from forming an organization by that or any other parody name. Similar statements and actions were taken by university officials at a range of other campuses, including Georgetown, George Washington, Temple, Indiana, Southern Methodist, and many other institutions.

Various patriotic and nationalist organizations such as the American Legion were vitriolic, with the National Legionnaire magazine mocking the "Pansies of Princeton" in verse.

Hate mail poured into the Veterans of Future Wars' office, with anonymous and signed letters calling the group's participants cowards, communists, and Nazis, and challenging their intelligence and virility. Critics advocated for the future lynching of "yellow slackers" when the next war eventually embroiled the country and the world.

Representative Claude Fuller of Arkansas went so far as to denounce the Veterans of Future Wars on the floor of the United States Congress, missing no target in characterizing the group as communist, fascist, and pacifist.

=== Demise and legacy ===
The Veterans of Future Wars, starting as a joke among friends before rapidly blowing up into a national sensation, proved to be ill-prepared for its sudden growth. Contradictions emerged between more conservative elements focused upon the frivolity of massive government spending on a soldiers' bonus during the depths of the Great Depression on the one hand and those on the organization's left interested in striking a lasting blow at growing militarism in the United States. While most of the thousands of students flocking to local groups associated with the VFW were attracted by the group's potential as a voice for pacifism, in the view of Fairleigh Dickinson University historian Chris Rasmussen, Gorin and the VFW leadership "were wary of presiding over a strictly antiwar organization or being branded as leftists or pacifists." The VFW leadership refused to support the Oxford Pledge or to lend the group's support to peace marches, student strikes, or other forms of direct action.

As the 1935–36 school year came to a close in June 1936, the Veterans of Future Wars reached the peak of its membership and activity; by the fall of 1936 and the resumption of college classes, indecision about how to proceed next froze local activity. As a result of its political hesitancy, the most active and radical supporters of the VFW quickly moved from the parody organization to more serious efforts to keep America out of the coming European war, such as the American Student Union.

VFW founder Lewis Gorin graduated from Princeton in June 1936 and enrolled at Harvard Law School for the coming year, further contributing to the VFW's organizational paralysis. Amidst this leadership vacuum and programmatic uncertainty, the Veterans of Future Wars atrophied as rapidly as it had arisen, dissolving by the end of the 1936–37 academic year.

The group's somewhat cynical view of the inevitability of American participation in a new European conflagration proved to be prescient, with Gorin and the entire governing National Council of the VFW, except for one member paralyzed in a car crash, ultimately joining the United States Armed Forces. Gorin served in the 6th Field Artillery Regiment on the European front, rising to the rank of colonel and ironically becoming eligible for a host of military benefits and a pension at the end of World War II.
