= Consumers' Association =

Consumers' Association is a common name for consumer protection organizations and can refer to:

- Australian Consumers Association
- Consumers' Association of Canada
- Consumers' Association of Ireland
- Consumers' Association of Penang
- Fiji Consumers Association
- Which?, a United Kingdom consumer organization, officially known as Consumers' Association

== See also ==
- Consumer organization, for a list of consumer protection organizations
