= John Mordaunt Trust =

Trustees

Mark Goldstein BSc

Adrian Garfoot MD - Andria Efthimiou-Mordaunt MSc

Advisory Team
Hattie Wells M.A

Margaret Maher Reverend Kenneth Leech DD RIP

The John Mordaunt Trust (JMT) was set up in 1996 to honour the memory of John Mordaunt, an AIDS activist.

== Goals ==
The John Mordaunt Trust is an advocacy project set up to campaign for the health and human rights of ex/current injectors affected by HIV and other blood-borne infections (BBIs).

== Background ==
John Mordaunt was deported from China alone as a result of his HIV status in 1986; when he had recovered from this trauma, he joined FRONTLINERS, the then-People With AIDS Coalition UK, to fight the human rights of those affected by HIV/AIDS. Mordaunt was a harm reduction activist, who spoke out in the media of drug use as a human right, or at least that drugs users had the right to not be persecuted for substance use.

As an ex-injection drug user (IDU), Mordaunt was aware of the dangers of drug prohibition, including risk of overdose deaths from unknown purity of drugs, fatal blood-borne infections from lack of access to clean injecting equipment, imprisonment, and the collateral damage of crimes committed against others in efforts to access illegal drugs day-in-day-out as well as violence related to drug-deals gone wrong.

After Mordaunt's death, harm reduction measures were extended, allowing activists to test the strength and quality of some drugs, particularly MDMA. Since 2018, the LOOP have been doing this work at events such music festivals.

The John Mordaunt Trust keeps its members informed via a newsletter called The Users Voice.

=== Achievements ===
In June 1998, JMT's founder, Andria Efthimiou (Mordaunt's widow), arranged for the first HIV+ ex-injector, Marsha Burnett, to address the UN General Assembly Special Session on Drugs about the failures of Global Drug prohibition. Burnett was joined by Omarya Morales, a Columbian Cocalera, whose home had been burnt to the ground by US-driven coca eradication policies.

== See also ==
- Demand reduction
- Prohibition (drugs)
