= Fantasy Congress =

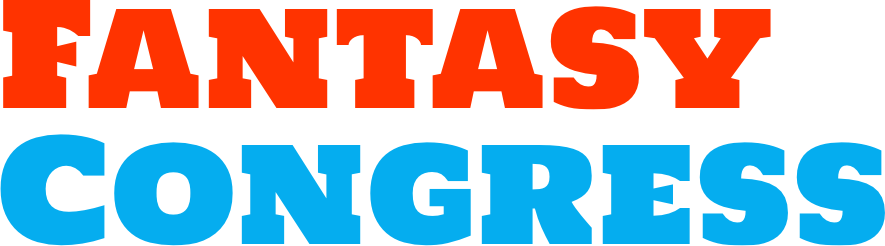
- Website type: Fantasy sport
- Website: https://fantasycongress.com
- Commercial: Yes
- Registration: Required to play
- Launched: 2018
- Current status: active

Fantasy Congress is an online game structured like fantasy sports where data gathered about congress is converted into points. Players create teams of individuals elected to the US House and Senate and members of congress acquire points based on legislative activity. Like fantasy sports, teams compete in small groups called leagues. At the end of the "season", each team with the most points in their league wins.

== History ==
Fantasy Congress was initially launched in 2006 as an online fantasy sport simulation where players would draft members of the United States House and Senate and keep track of their participation within the U.S. Congress. A congressperson's actions, especially within the process of making and amending pieces of legislation, were recorded and rated as a cumulative total number of points against other players.

Points were calculated based on "Legislative success" (including co-sponsored legislation and amendments), voting attendance, "Maverick Score" (the willingness of a member of Congress to cross-party lines in close party votes), and noteworthy news mentions. Legislative success was the progress of a congressperson's sponsored or cosponsored legislation through the U.S. legislative process, all the way up to the President's signature or veto. Also, small legislative actions counted for points, such as amendments and changes to the legislation.

This version of Fantasy Congress, which ran from 2006 to 2009, was meant to appeal to both recreational and educational players. It offered a wide range of links and research tools to help players in choosing their members of Congress. The creators believed the game could make the government more accountable.

In 2018 the Fantasy Congress website was revived under new ownership. A new game was introduced that encouraged players to predict which individuals were most likely to get elected, instead of their legislative success.

Players began by drafting candidates running for office. During the election season, candidates acquired points based on how much money they raised, frequency of media mentions, and their percentage of the vote in the election. Similar to fantasy sports, players could drop candidates from their roster and add new ones throughout the season. Teams won by collecting the most points in their league by the end of the 2018 midterm elections.

After the 2018 election, the game was re-released around following legislative activity in Congress, similar to its predecessor.

== Gameplay ==
In Fantasy Congress, players select members of Congress for their team and acquire points based on activity in the U.S. House and Senate. For example, players can receive points when a legislator on their team sponsors legislation, or participates in a roll call vote. Points are also awarded to members of Congress that frequently appear in the news. The player(s) whose team has the most points at the end of the season wins.

The game starts by players forming a "league." A league consists of several teams that agree to play against each other for a set number of weeks. The time period in which the teams are playing against each other is called a "season". Once the league and its corresponding teams are set up, the game starts with each team choosing members of Congress for their roster. This process is known as a "draft".

After the draft is complete, the season begins. Each week, teams are awarded points based on the activity of their Congress members.

During the season, teams also have the ability to adjust their roster by replacing under-performing legislators for better ones. This can be done by trading with another team in the league, or adding a member of Congress to your team who is currently unclaimed. A team's roster, or "line-up", is locked each week. Meaning, a player cannot change their lineup for the week once it has started. Players must adjust their lineup for the week before that week starts.

Once the season is complete, the team with the most points wins.
