= Zionist Freedom Alliance =

Israeli zionist organisation

The Zionist Freedom Alliance (ZFA) is a Zionist movement that advocates Israel's moral, legal and historic rights for the Jewish people to the entire Land of Israel, which they consider to include the territory captured during the 1967 Six-Day War.

The ZFA differs from other Zionist movements is that it fights for social causes often associated with the left while maintaining a hard right position on Jewish national identity and Israel's borders. In November 2007, the Jewish Telegraphic Agency reported the ZFA to be promoting Israeli nationalism on twenty American college campuses and described the group as socially liberal with a hard-right stance on Israeli border issues.

== Activities ==
=== On American campuses ===
ZFA trains activists on college campus to promote what the group terms "Jewish liberation." In February 2008 the ZFA created controversy at the University of Pennsylvania by holding a demonstration against Breaking the Silence, a group of ex-Israeli soldiers who came to the campus in order to speak against the IDF's presence in territories captured by Israel in the 1967 Six-Day War. ZFA accused Breaking the Silence of being financed by Western governments to smear the State of Israel, an accusation that was later validated by The Jerusalem Post in July 2009.

==== Violence at Berkeley ====
On November 13, 2008, violence erupted between ZFA and the Students for Justice in Palestine at an Israel Liberation Week event taking place at UC Berkeley. The incident, which took place during a ZFA concert featuring Black, Jewish and Mexican hip hop artists promoting freedom for Israel from Western pressure and foreign influence, began when anti-Israel students unfurled Palestinian flags from a balcony overlooking the concert stage. ZFA activists attempted to remove the flags and a fight broke out between the two organizations. While both groups accused the other of initiating the violence, both agreed that ZFA prevailed in the actual fight. Following the incident, SJP members told Berkeley police that pro-Israel students made racial slurs against Arab students during the fight but the charge was denied by ZFA leaders, who view both themselves and Arabs as belonging to the same Semitic race.

Following the incident, one Jew and two Arabs were cited with charges of battery by Berkeley police. Mainstream Jewish organizations refrained from taking any sides in the conflict but distanced themselves from ZFA by denouncing all acts of violence and violations of university policy.

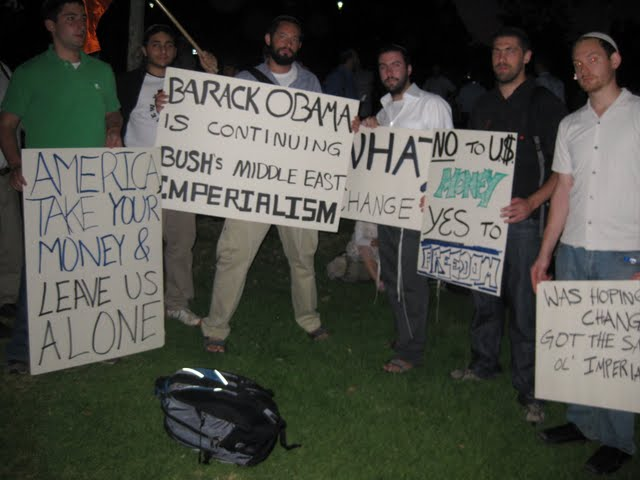
ZFA activists protesting against American pressure across from the US Consulate in Jerusalem

==== Strengthening the Jewish presence of Beit Hanina ====
In 2009 a number of ZFA members moved into the Beit Shiva building in the East Jerusalem neighborhood of Beit Hanina. The building had been inhabited by veteran Lehi fighters following the 1967 Six-Day War and had remained the sole Jewish building in an otherwise Arab neighborhood. Concerned that as the elderly Lehi veterans die the Jewish hold on the building would be weakened, ZFA activists began to move into apartments left vacant by deceased tenants.

==== Shomron Volunteer Program ====
In August 2009 ZFA and the Shomron Liaisons Office cooperated to create a volunteer program for American students in the hilltop communities of the Samaria region. The controversial Jewish communities had been the central focus of American pressure on Israel's government and students looking to defy Washington and strengthen Israel's hold on the region spent a week working, building and farming in Yitzhar, Shalhevet Yam, Har Brakha, Kfar Tapuach, and Havat Gilad. The Jerusalem Post reported ZFA leader Yehuda HaKohen working with a dozen program participants planting a vineyard on a hilltop near the Har Brakha community, just outside Shechem. In October 2009 the week long volunteer program was repeated at the village of El Matan.

== See also ==
- Greater Israel
- International law and the Arab–Israeli conflict
- Israel Eldad
- Israeli settlement
- International law and Israeli settlements
- Labor Zionism
- Land of Israel
- Left-wing nationalism
- Lehi (group)
- Movement for Greater Israel
- Religious Zionism
- Revisionist Zionism
- Status of territories captured by Israel
- Zionism
- Zionist youth movement
