= Yuan Baishun =

Hunan University Academic

Yuan Baishun is professor of political science, an academic committee member, and Vice Dean of the law school at Hunan University.

Yuan is also the executive director of the Center for Clean Governance of Hunan Province; Editor-in-Chief of the Journal of Anti-Corruption Studies; vice chairman of the Chinese Society of Integrity Education and Anti-Corruption Studies; and a board member of Transparency International-China and of the Chinese Society of Political Science.
