= Factual association =

Judicial term used in Continental European civil law

Factual association (Association de Fait in French, Feitelijke Vereniging in Dutch) is a judicial term used in Continental European civil law, as well as in some derived law systems.

A factual association is an organization which only exists because of a common achievement or goal. When two people decide to develop something together, the factual association is born. Stricto sensu, it is a club without a special judicial ground. The factual association can never be a part in contracts, can never own property, can never make donations or accept legacies. Every action made by the organization must be made in name of one of the members who will be personally responsible for the consequences of that action.

To secure political independence, in most European countries, political parties are factual associations. Because of that status, they can never be condemned as a whole.

== See also ==
- Voluntary association
