= Calculus of voting =

Mathematical model that predicts voting behaviour

Calculus of voting refers to any mathematical model which predicts voting behaviour by an electorate, including such features as participation rate. A calculus of voting represents a hypothesized decision-making process.

These models are used in political science in an attempt to capture the relative importance of various factors influencing an elector to vote (or not vote) in a particular way.

== Example ==
One such model was proposed by Anthony Downs (1957) and is adapted by William H. Riker and Peter Ordeshook, in “A Theory of the Calculus of Voting” (Riker and Ordeshook 1968)

V = pB − C + D

where

V = the proxy for the probability that the voter will turn out
p = probability of vote “mattering”
B = “utility” benefit of voting--differential benefit of one candidate winning over the other
C = costs of voting (time/effort spent)
D = citizen duty, goodwill feeling, psychological and civic benefit of voting (this term is not included in Downs's original model)

A political science model based on rational choice used to explain why citizens do or do not vote.

The alternative equation is

V = pB + D > C

Where for voting to occur the (P)robability the vote will matter "times" the (B)enefit of one candidate winning over another combined with the feeling of civic (D)uty, must be greater than the (C)ost of voting
