= Education Action Group Foundation =

Non-profit organization in Michigan, United States

- Founder: Kyle Olson
- Type: 501(c)(3) nonprofit
- Purpose: To advocate for educational choice
- Location: Muskegon, Michigan
- Region served: United States
- Revenue: $378,223 (2014)
- Expenses: $606,002 (2014)
- Website: eagnews.org

The Education Action Group Foundation (EAG) is a nonprofit organization located in Michigan with a mission focused on increasing educational choice and cutting what it perceives to be wasteful spending.

The organization, which is active nationwide, has a stated mission of "promoting sensible education reform and exposing those with a vested interest in maintaining the status quo...highlighting every day the need for a student-focused education system that is financially sustainable and will put us on a firm footing to compete globally in the future."

EAG has encouraged public schools to cut waste. The group has used Freedom of Information Act requests to obtain spending records from public schools.
