= Minimal effects hypothesis =

In political science, the minimal effects hypothesis states that political campaigns only marginally persuade and convert voters. The hypothesis was formulated during early research into voting behavior between the 1940s and the 1960s, and this period formed the initial "minimum effects" era in the United States. The hypothesis seemed solid and was associated with the general assumption that voters had clear positions on issues and knew where candidates stood on these issues. Since then the minimal effects hypothesis has been criticized and empirical research since the 1980s has suggested that voters do have uncertainties about candidates' positions and these uncertainties do influence voters' decisions. These findings have led to renewed interest in research into the effects of campaigns, with recent published research appearing both for and against the minimal effects hypothesis.

== See also ==
- Pluralism
- Corporatism
