= Corrective Revolution =

Corrective Revolution, Corrective Movement, or Corrective Step may refer to:

- Corrective Move, a South Yemeni internal coup within National Front in 1969
- June 13 Corrective Movement, a bloodless military coup in the Yemen Arab Republic
- Corrective Revolution (Egypt), reforms introduced by Anwar Sadat in 1971
- Corrective Revolution (Syria), a bloodless coup d'état in Ba'athist Syria, carried out by General Hafez al-Assad
- Corrective Movement (Syria), big campaign of reforms launched by Hafez al-Assad in Syria

== See also ==
- 2013 Egyptian coup d'état, the coup plotters initially announced that a Corrective Revolution had occurred
