= Mayday Mutual Aid Medical Station =

The Mayday Mutual Aid Medical Station was a tent set up in the Algiers neighborhood of New Orleans, Louisiana after Hurricane Katrina, in part as a response to a call by Malik Rahim and other community activists in Algiers for emergency medics to run a first aid station and help develop a permanent health clinic.

The section of Algiers in which the clinic is located is populated mostly by poor and African American residents. The volunteer group holds that the community has been under-served by accessible health care for years: only a maternal/newborn clinic has been functioning. Public health care for those without insurance was available via the now closed Charity Hospital emergency room, with waits of twelve hours or more for nonemergency cases.

Volunteers answering the call formed the Common Ground Collective. Three First Responder "Street Medics" and two community activists answered the medics' call and set up a First Aid station on September 9 in a mosque turned over to them. Several days later, doctors, nurses, herbalists and massage therapists began showing up. Soon, the group was receiving national attention from the progressive/left community in the U.S. The first aid station became a functioning clinic operating morning to night every day, doing house calls, and setting up temporary satellite clinics in a church and in wards in New Orleans.

The volunteer aid workers have provided services including a free primary care clinic, and free supplies like vitamins, baby food, and health and hygiene goods.

The clinic has helped around 55 to 60 people a day during the weekend and around 100 during the weekdays. It is estimated that the clinic has served over 2,000 cases since its inception in early September.

Located in front of the Masjib Bilal Mosque, it is staffed by a varying number of volunteer doctors, medics, RNs, herbalists, acupuncturists, massage therapists and social workers. Other resources have included:

- a truck from Cafe Manowaj (from Washington DC)
- the Mayday DC/Infoshop News relief van
- a vehicle full of supplies from Asheville, North Carolina.
