= Canal Contemporâneo =

- Founded: 2000
- Country: Brazil

Canal Contemporâneo is a digital community and publication focused on Brazilian contemporary art. It holds and spreads information, knowledge and debates in its different online modules: e-bulletins, blogs, forums, portfolios and art calendar. Based on concepts like Virtual Community (Howard Rheingold), Radical Media (J. D. H. Downing) and Tactical media (D. Garcia/G. Lovink), Canal Contemporâneo has been efficient in rousing communication and interaction, connecting people and institutions around the 27 Brazilian states and over 80 countries.

Created by the artist Patricia Canetti in 2000-2001, Canal Contemporâneo was born like a bulletin (the so-called e-nforme), which was sent to an initial list of 200 electronic addresses. Six years after its creation and succeeding developments, it has become the most influential medium of information and politization of Brazilian contemporary art in the Internet, being visited by more than 80 thousand people per month. Canal Contemporâneo and the works in it are also inserted in the exhibitions context. Performing as an “artist” in the contemporary art circuit, it completes its mission as a collective work and a space of engagement for the needs of the visual and technological arts.

Its on-line activism with petitions, forums and lists of discussion guides frequent journal articles and has been able to encourage mobilization. It got clear in the episode that turned the community against the use of public funds for the construction of a Guggenheim Museum in Rio de Janeiro (2003) and in the process of including the Digital Art in the scope of the Brazilian Funding laws (2004). Though the visibility given by Canal Contemporâneo since 2001, the applications for national art salons increased three times and, for the regional ones, they were multiplied by 10.

Canal Contemporâneo made its debut in exhibitions in 2004. The first one was the hiPer> relações eletro // digitais (hiPer>electro//digital relations), curated by Daniela Bousso for the Sergio Motta Art and Technology Award and for the Santander Cultural, in Porto Alegre, with the work "Quebra de Padrão" (Breaking standards). Then, came "Tudo aquilo que escapa" (Everything that escapes), curated by Cristiana Tejo, as part of the 46th Visual Arts Salon of Pernambuco, at Museu do Estado in Recife, with the work "Para que servem os Salões?" (What are the salons made for?). Canal Contemporâneo was also invited to take part in the Digital Communities category in Ars Electronica and, since then, Patricia Canetti, Canal Contemporâneo's coordinator, has been a member of the International Advisory Board of Digital Communities.

Canal Contemporâneo has also taken part of the Documenta 12 magazines, collaborating with several theoretical and artistic works and being invited to talk in the “Paper and Pixel” week in Kassel (Germany), in July 2007.

Since 2005, the special projects of Canal Contemporâneo have been sponsored by Petrobras, Brazilian major cultural sponsor.
