= Princeton AlumniCorps =

American nonprofit organization

Princeton AlumniCorps is an American nonprofit organization that promotes civic leadership and the development of solutions to problems that affect the public interest. It was established in 1989 as Princeton Project 55. Its membership includes alumni and current students at Princeton University in Princeton, New Jersey, as well as others.

AlumniCorps activities include:

- Matching recent graduates with fellowships in public service organizations
- providing mentors and professional development
- supporting alumni from other universities engaged in similar initiatives
- collaborating with on-campus programs to raise the profile of civic engagement among current undergraduates

== History ==
Princeton AlumniCorps was founded in 1989 by the Princeton Class of 1955 and their spouses.

The AlumniCorps's Fellowship Programs have placed more than 1,100 students and recent Princeton graduates in paid fellowships and internship programs around the country. More than 20 other colleges and universities have developed similar programs based on its model and are supported by the project's outreach initiative, "The Alumni Network".

AlumniCorps is led by a board of directors consisting of Princeton alumni in classes ranging from 1955 to 2013.

== Public Interest Program ==
The Public Interest Program places recent Princeton graduates in yearlong fellowships in six locations:

- New York
- Boston
- Chicago
- San Francisco,
- Connecticut
- Washington, DC.

In each location, an all volunteer area committee exposes fellows to various issues in their community through regular seminars. The area committee also works to provide opportunities for professional development and access to a network of mentors.

Possible fields for fellowships include community development, education, employment and welfare, environmental issues, advocacy, health and medicine, housing, women's issues, and youth services.
