= Disarm Bush T-Shirts =

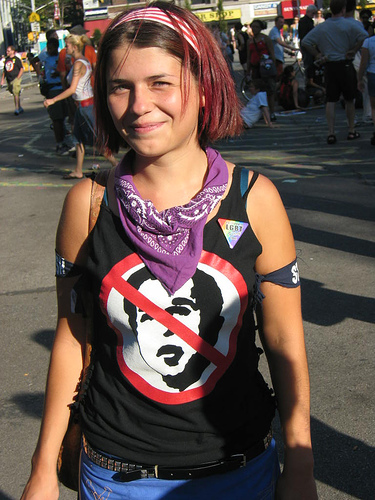
A protester at the RNC in New York sports a Disarm Bush t-shirt.

Disarm Bush T-Shirts is a for-profit political activism campaign created in 2004 in the run-up to the American Presidential election, in which the incumbent George W. Bush ultimately defeated challenger John Kerry. Disarm Bush effectively mobilized opposition to the Republican incumbent in a number of large metropolitan population centers, in which their guerrilla t-shirt vending methods were most successful. Through 2005, the organization had sold no fewer than 25,000 t-shirts with their universally recognizable anti-Bush logo and registered over 5,000 citizens to vote.

Founded by Ysiad Ferreiras in Union Square in lower Manhattan, the group expanded to include hundreds of for-profit activists who spread the group's message at both national political conventions in 2004 and at speeches across the country. The shirts were especially effective in mobilizing political activity on college campuses. Ben Piven became the director of PR, political activism, and national distribution, while Marty Taylor took charge of Disarm Bush's internet campaign.

Eventually popularized by the Roots, Yeah Yeah Yeahs, and The Flaming Lips, the Disarm Bush logo became a simple but powerful expression of disapproval of the incumbent's performance in office. The Republican National Convention, which lasted from August 30 to September 2, saw the emergence of hundreds of similar t-shirt campaigns in which vendors attempted to spread their political dissent via the estimated 500,000 marchers who converged upon New York City to protest the presence of Republicans in a largely Democratic Party urban area. The 2004 Republican National Convention protest activity created an unprecedented level of political mobilization and also posed security problems.
