= European of the Year =

European of the Year may refer to:

- European of the Year (European Voice award)
- European of the Year (Reader's Digest award)
- European of the Year (Trombinoscope award)
