= Virginians Against Drug Violence =

Virginians Against Drug Violence is an organization devoted to ending the drug war in Virginia. It was founded in 1990 by Lennice Werth. Prominent members include Roy Scherer and Michael Krawitz. The organization reviews the Virginia General Assembly's bills every year, sending out emails to a network of citizens and urging them to contact their legislators on relevant issues. It recent years they have moved much of their notifications to social media, primarily Facebook. Their activists persuaded the legislature to carve out an exemption in the marijuana cultivation law so that individuals growing cannabis for their own use would be prosecuted only for simple possession. Virginia thus has more lenient laws on cultivation than even California. In addition, their activists successfully lobbied the General Assembly to keep medical marijuana legal for cancer and glaucoma, and to put marijuana in a class by itself, as opposed to being a scheduled controlled substance. More recently they have has worked with Virginia NORML and Cannabis Commonwealth.

== See also ==
- Legal status of cannabis in Virginia
