= Center for the Evaluation of Risks to Human Reproduction =

Environmental health resource

The National Toxicology Program (NTP) and the National Institute of Environmental Health Sciences (NIEHS) established the NTP Center for the Evaluation of Risks to Human Reproduction in 1998 as an environmental health resource to the public and regulatory and health agencies. The Center provides evaluations of the potential for adverse effects on reproduction and development caused by chemicals to which humans might be exposed.
