= RISE International =

RISE is an organization that builds primary schools in rural Angola to educate children, empower communities, and contribute to the rebuilding of the country. RISE works to give thousands of children the opportunity to receive an education.

== History ==
Founded as the African Refugee Committee (ARC) in 2001, the organization brought relief, development, and support to refugees of the 27-year Angolan Civil War, both in Namibia and Zambia. When the war ended in 2002, an entire generation was left unable to read and write. RISE was committed to help rebuild Angola, building primary schools in rural areas. While the Angolan Ministry of Education concentrated their efforts primarily in urban areas, RISE focused on bringing the opportunity for education to children in remote, less accessible regions of the country.
