= Fu Xiancai =

Chinese farmer and activist

Fu Xiancai (付先財, born 1965) is a Chinese farmer and civil rights activist.

Fu grew up near the Yangtze River. He became politically active in 1994, when his village was threatened by the construction of the Three Gorges Dam. In 1997 he was forced to leave his home after it was flooded by the water of the reservoir.

Since that time he has been campaigning for better resettlement compensation from the People's Republic of China for those forced to move by the construction.

On May 19, 2006, Fu gave an interview to the German television station ARD in which he discussed the dam. Following the interview he was warned by Chinese authorities for his activism and received a broken leg and blows to the head. In June 2006, he was summoned to receive a further warning from police and assaulted as he returned home. He is partially paralyzed as a consequence of his injuries.

The German government has protested against his situation and the potential implications for other foreign correspondents in China. Germany provided the money needed for the operation and the operation took place on June 18.

In July, the official investigation, carried out by the same public security bureau that had been harassing Fu, concluded that the attack had been fabricated. Their report states that no other footprints were found around Fu's home and that he must have hit himself in the back of the neck, breaking three vertebrae and causing partial paralysis.

In 2006, Fu was awarded the Housing Rights Defender award by the Centre on Housing Rights and Evictions (COHRE).
