= Politics of country subdivisions =

This list summarizes the administrative divisions which have a separate article on their politics. Countries where significant powers delegated to federal units or to devolved governments and where the political system is multi-party democracy are more likely to have articles on the politics of their subdivisions.

Entities listed in the article List of countries are shows in the article Politics of present-day nations and states.

== Australia ==
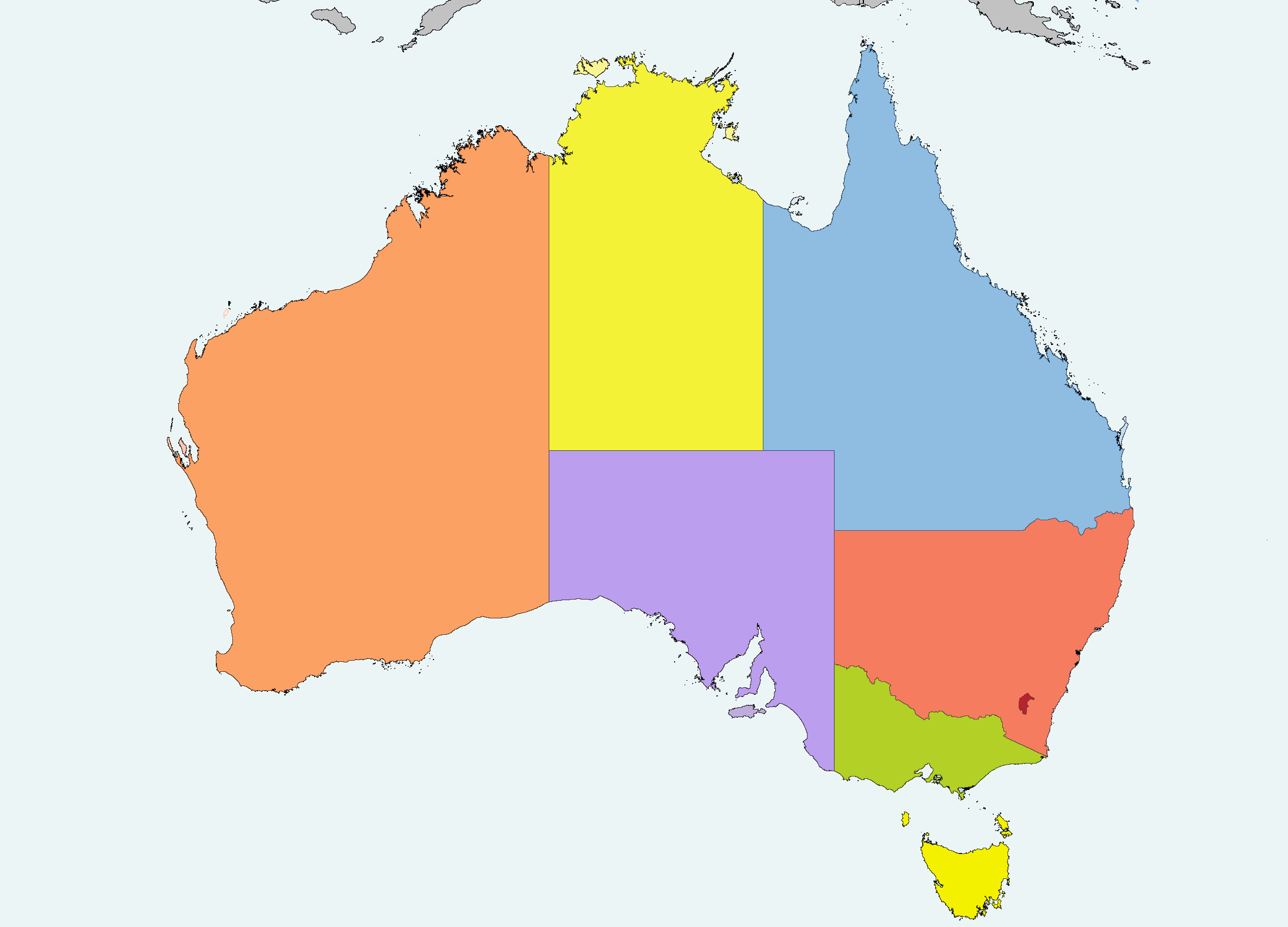

== Belgium ==
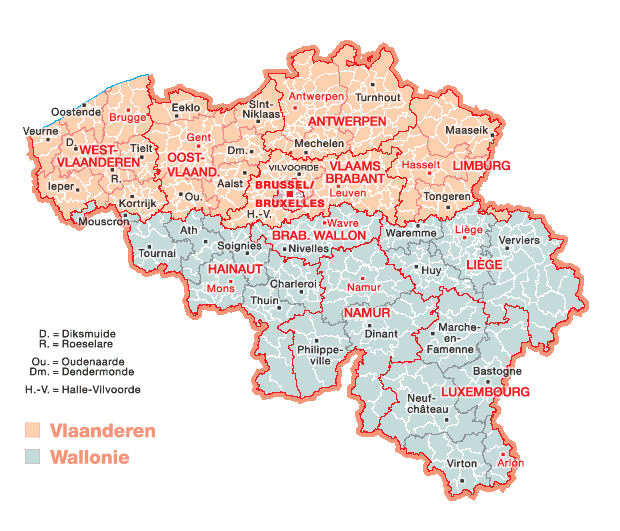
Belgium, showing Flanders (red), Wallonia (blue) and Brussels (purple)

- Politics of Flanders
- Politics of Wallonia
- Politics of the Brussels-Capital Region

== Bosnia and Herzegovina ==
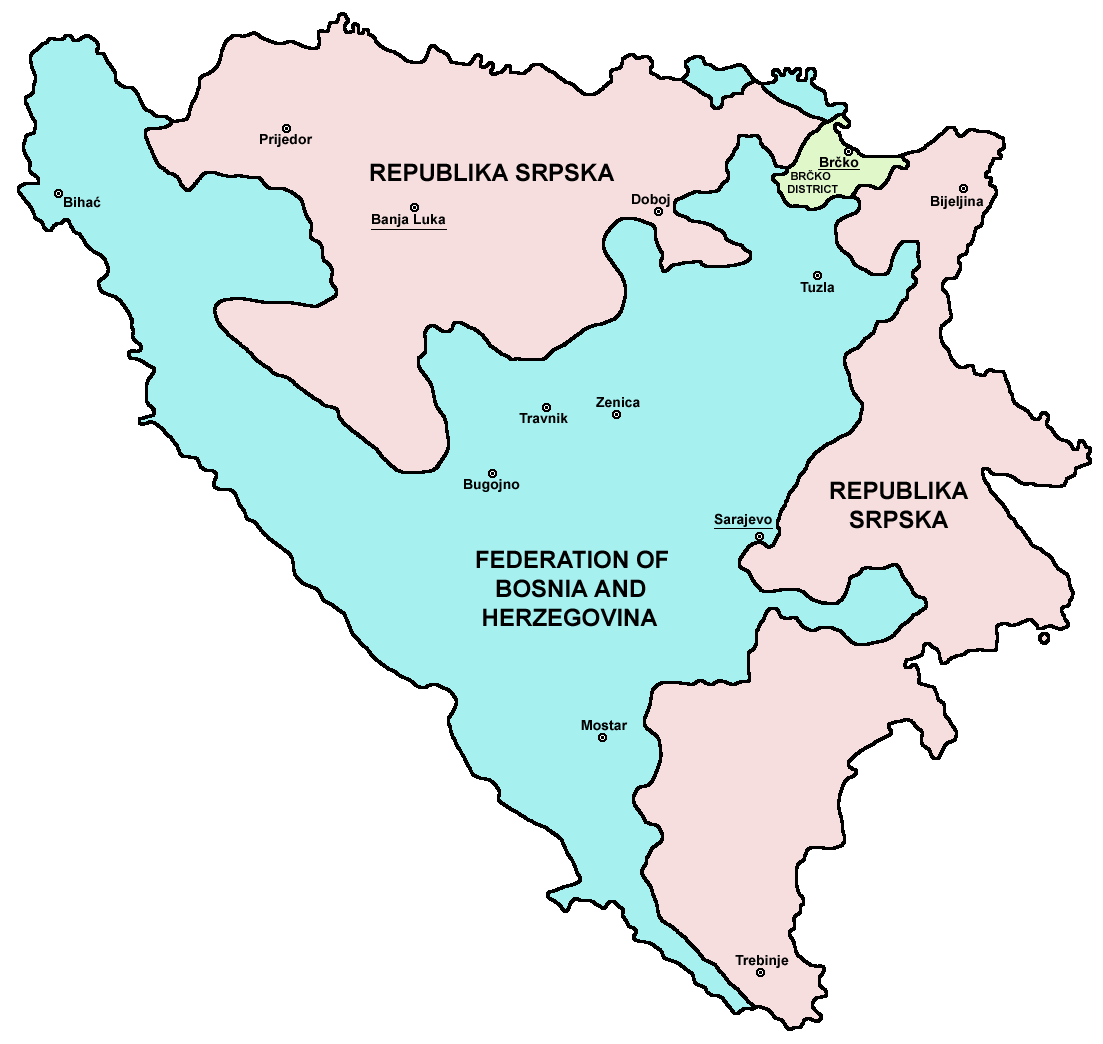
Bosnia and Herzegovina showing Republika Srpska, the Federation and Brčko

- Politics of Republika Srpska
- Politics of the Federation of Bosnia and Herzegovina

== Canada ==
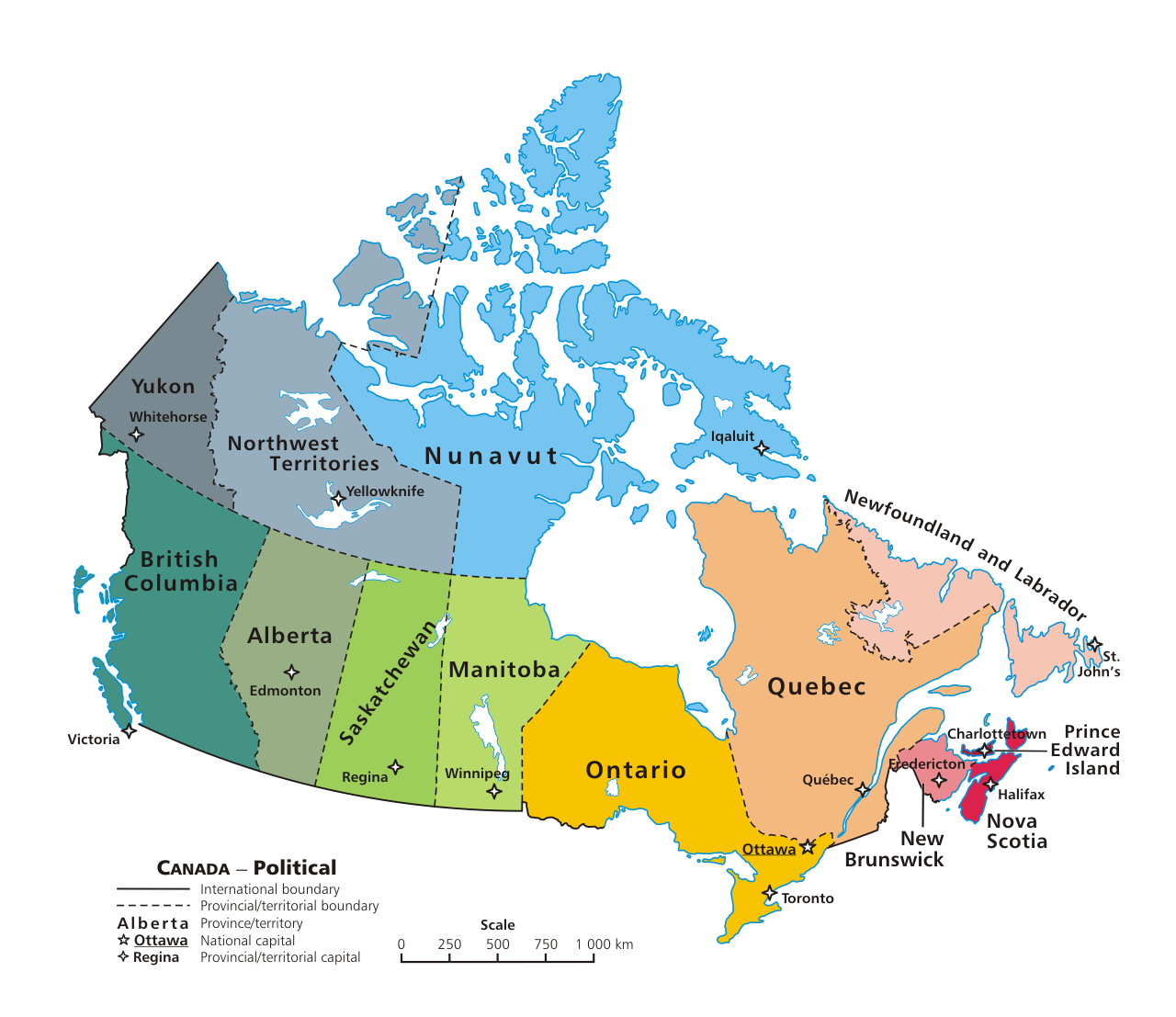
Provinces of Canada

- Politics of Ontario
- Politics of Quebec
- Politics of Nova Scotia
- Politics of New Brunswick
- Politics of Manitoba
- Politics of British Columbia
- Politics of Prince Edward Island
- Politics of Saskatchewan
- Politics of Alberta
- Politics of Newfoundland and Labrador
- Politics of Northwest Territories
- Politics of Yukon
- Politics of Nunavut

== Denmark ==
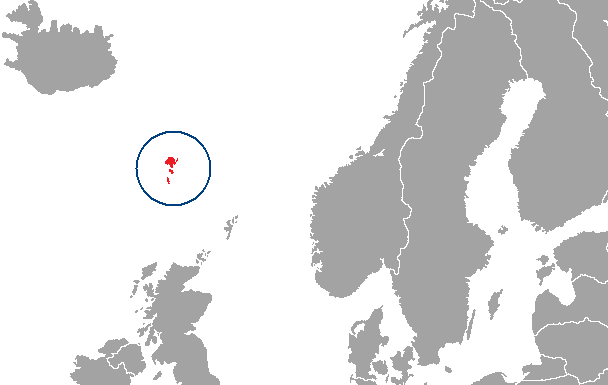

- Politics of the Faroe Islands

== Finland ==
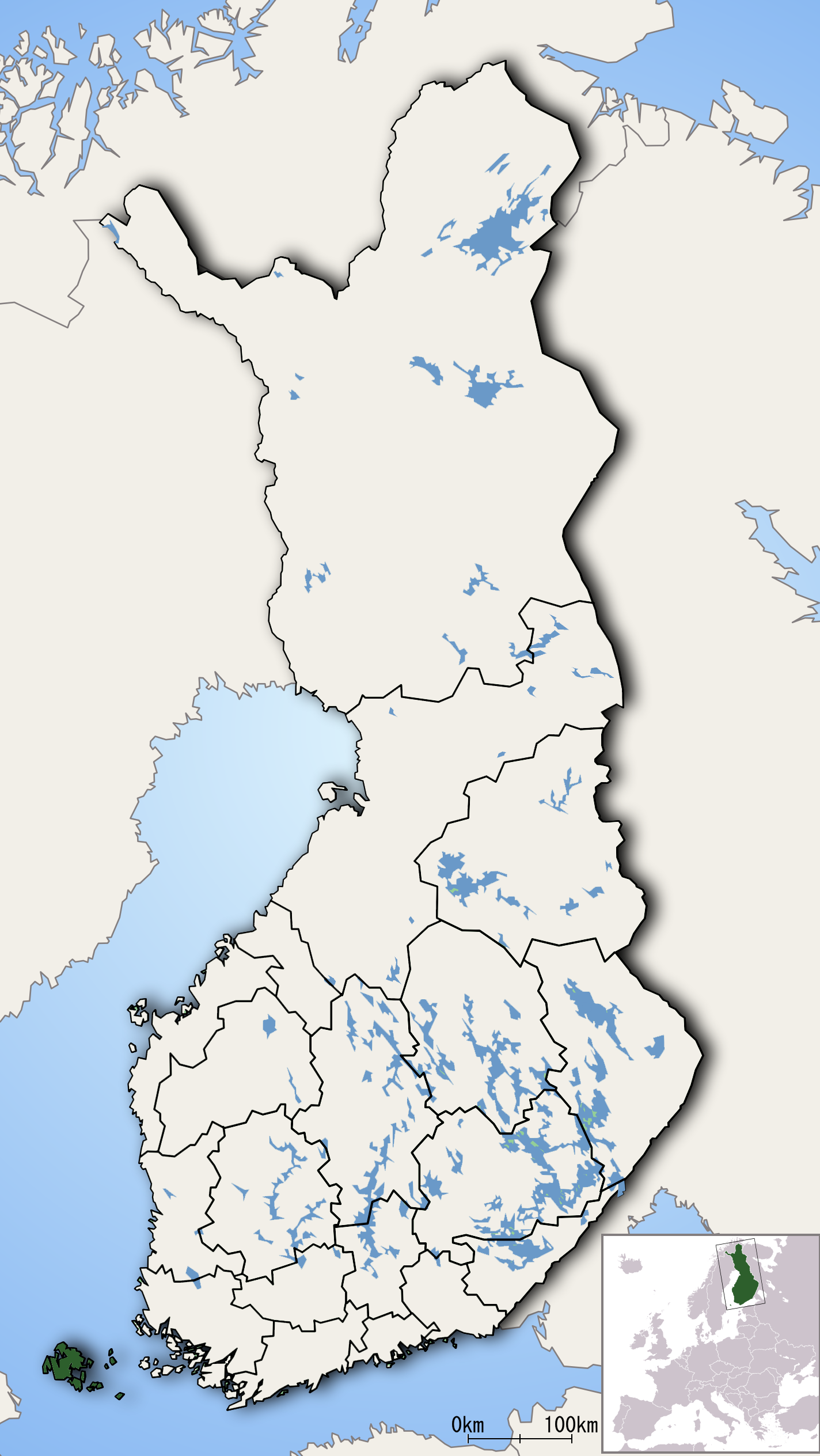

- Politics of Åland

== France ==
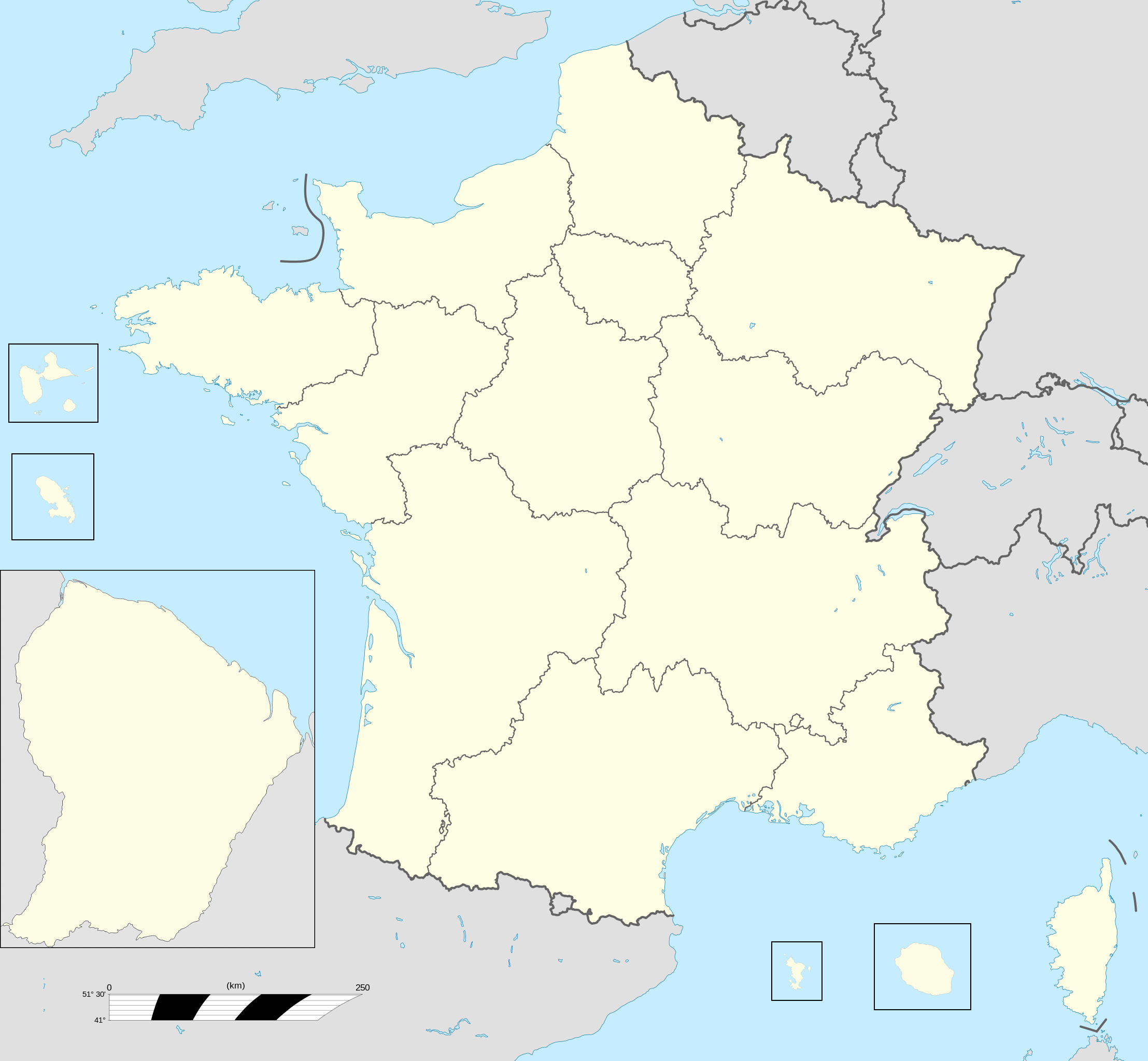

== Georgia (country) ==
- Politics of Abkhazia
- Politics of Samegrelo-Zemo Svaneti
- Politics of Guria
- Politics of Adjara
- Politics of Racha-Lechkhumi and Kvemo Svaneti
- Politics of Imereti
- Politics of Samtskhe-Javakheti
- Politics of Shida Kartli
- Politics of South Ossetia
- Politics of Mtskheta-Mtianeti
- Politics of Kvemo Kartli
- Politics of Kakheti
- Politics of Tbilisi

== India ==
Administrative divisions of India

== Iran ==
- Politics of Khūzestān Province

== Italy ==
Region	Capital	Area (km^{2})	Population
Abruzzo	L'Aquila	10,794	1,324,000
Aosta Valley	Aosta	3,263	126,000
Apulia	Bari	19,362	4,076,000
Basilicata	Potenza	9,992	591,000
Calabria	Catanzaro	15,080	2,007,000
Campania	Naples	13,595	5,811,000
Emilia-Romagna	Bologna	22,124	4,276,000
Friuli-Venezia Giulia	Trieste	7,855	1,222,000
Lazio	Rome	17,207	5,561,000
Liguria	Genoa	5,421	1,610,000
Lombardy	Milan	23,861	9,642,000
Marche	Ancona	9,694	1,553,000
Molise	Campobasso	4,438	320,000
Piedmont	Turin	25,399	4,401,000
Sardinia	Cagliari	24,090	1,666,000
Sicily	Palermo	25,708	5,030,000
Tuscany	Florence	22,997	3,677,000
Trentino-Alto Adige/Südtirol	Trento	13,607	1,007,000
Umbria	Perugia	8,456	884,000
Veneto	Venice	18,391	4,832,000

== Russia ==
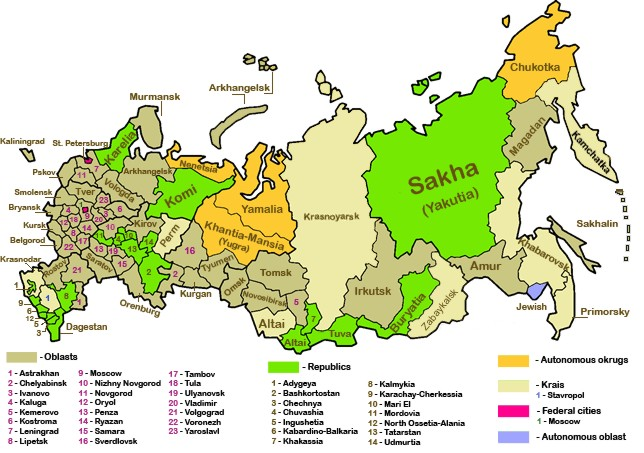

- Politics of Adygea
- Politics of Bashkortostan
- Politics of Buryatia
- Politics of Altai Republic
- Politics of Dagestan
- Politics of Ingushetia
- Politics of Kabardino-Balkaria
- Politics of Kalmykia
- Politics of Karachay–Cherkessia
- Politics of Karelia
- Politics of Komi
- Politics of Mari El
- Politics of Mordovia
- Politics of Sakha (Yakutia)
- Politics of North Ossetia-Alania
- Politics of Tatarstan
- Politics of Tyva
- Politics of Udmurtia
- Politics of Khakassia
- Politics of Chechnya
- Politics of Chuvashia
- Politics of Altai Krai
- Politics of Kamchatka
- Politics of Krasnodar
- Politics of Krasnoyarsk
- Politics of Primorsky
- Politics of Stavropol
- Politics of Khabarovsk
- Politics of Perm
- Politics of Amur
- Politics of Arkhangelsk
- Politics of Astrakhan
- Politics of Belgorod
- Politics of Bryansk
- Politics of Vladimir
- Politics of Volgograd
- Politics of Vologda
- Politics of Voronezh
- Politics of Ivanovo
- Politics of Irkutsk
- Politics of Kaliningrad
- Politics of Kaluga
- Politics of Kemerovo
- Politics of Kirov
- Politics of Kostroma
- Politics of Kurgan
- Politics of Kursk
- Politics of Leningrad
- Politics of Lipetsk
- Politics of Magadan
- Politics of Moscow
- Politics of Murmansk
- Politics of Nizhny Novgorod
- Politics of Novgorod
- Politics of Novosibirsk
- Politics of Omsk
- Politics of Orenburg
- Politics of Oryol
- Politics of Penza
- Politics of Pskov
- Politics of Rostov
- Politics of Ryazan
- Politics of Samara
- Politics of Saratov
- Politics of Sakhalin
- Politics of Sverdlovsk
- Politics of Smolensk
- Politics of Tambov
- Politics of Tver
- Politics of Tomsk
- Politics of Tula
- Politics of Tyumen
- Politics of Ulyanovsk
- Politics of Chelyabinsk
- Politics of Chita
- Politics of Yaroslavl
- Politics of St. Petersburg
- Politics of the Jewish Autonomous Oblast
- Politics of Aga Buryatia
- Politics of Nenetsia
- Politics of Ust-Orda Buryatia
- Politics of Khantia-Mansia
- Politics of Chukotka
- Politics of Yamalia

== Serbia ==
- Politics of Vojvodina

== South Africa ==
Provinces of South Africa

- Politics of the Western Cape
- Politics of the Northern Cape
- Politics of the Eastern Cape
- Politics of KwaZulu-Natal
- Politics of the Free State
- Politics of North West (South African province)
- Politics of Gauteng
- Politics of Mpumalanga
- Politics of Limpopo

== Spain ==
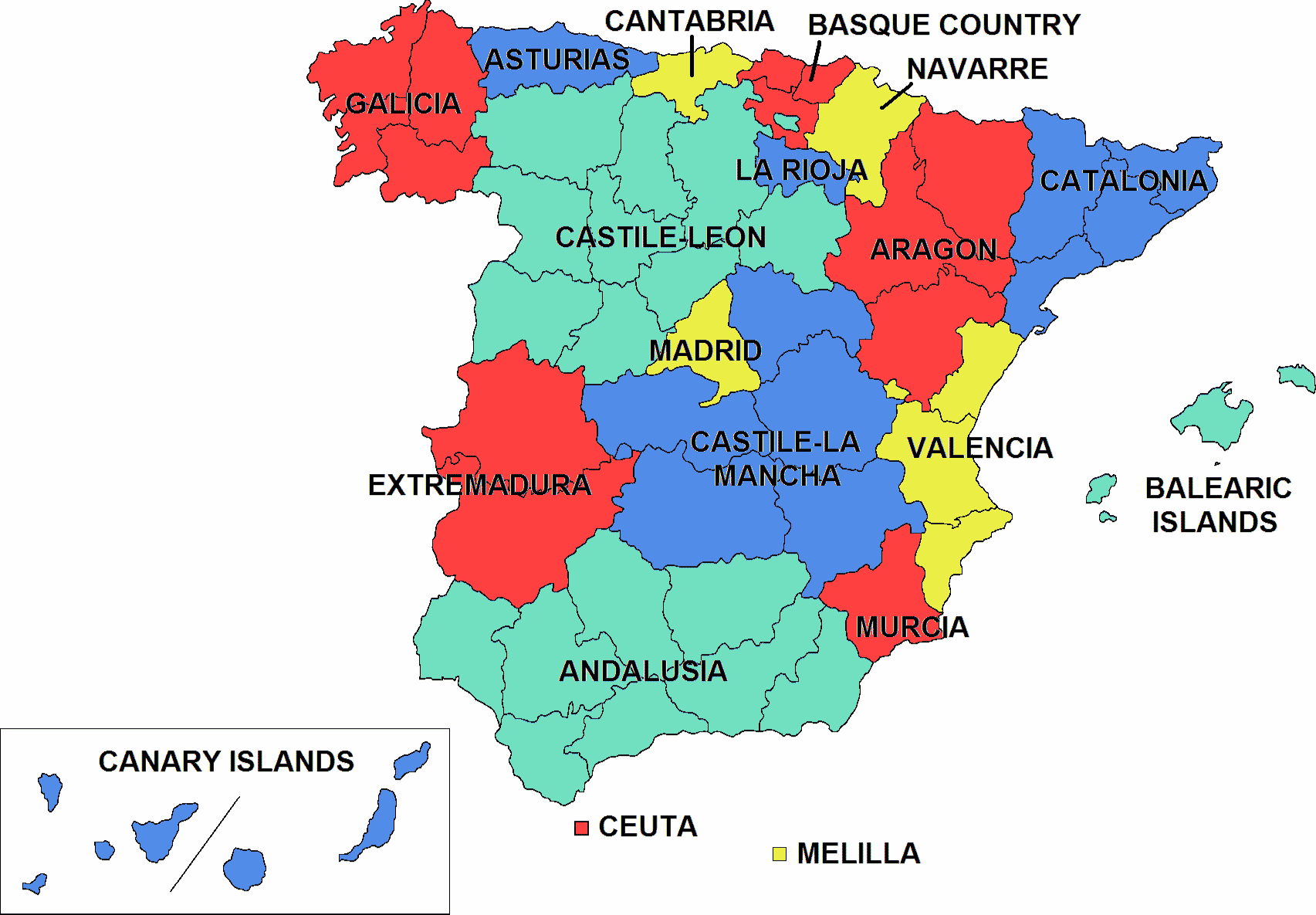
Autonomous communities of Spain

- Politics of Andalusia
- Politics of Aragon
- Politics of the Balearic Islands
- Politics of the Basque Country
- Politics of the Canary Islands
- Politics of Cantabria
- Politics of Castile and León
- Politics of Castile-La Mancha
- Politics of Catalonia
- Politics of Extremadura
- Politics of Navarre
- Politics of Galicia
- Politics of La Rioja
- Politics of Madrid
- Politics of Asturias
- Politics of Murcia
- Politics of Valencia
- Politics of Ceuta
- Politics of Melilla

== Sudan ==
- Politics of Southern Sudan

== Ukraine ==
- Politics of Crimea

== United Kingdom ==
Home Nations of the United Kingdom
- Politics of England (England is not a current political division)
- Politics of Scotland
- Politics of Wales
- Politics of Northern Ireland

== United States ==
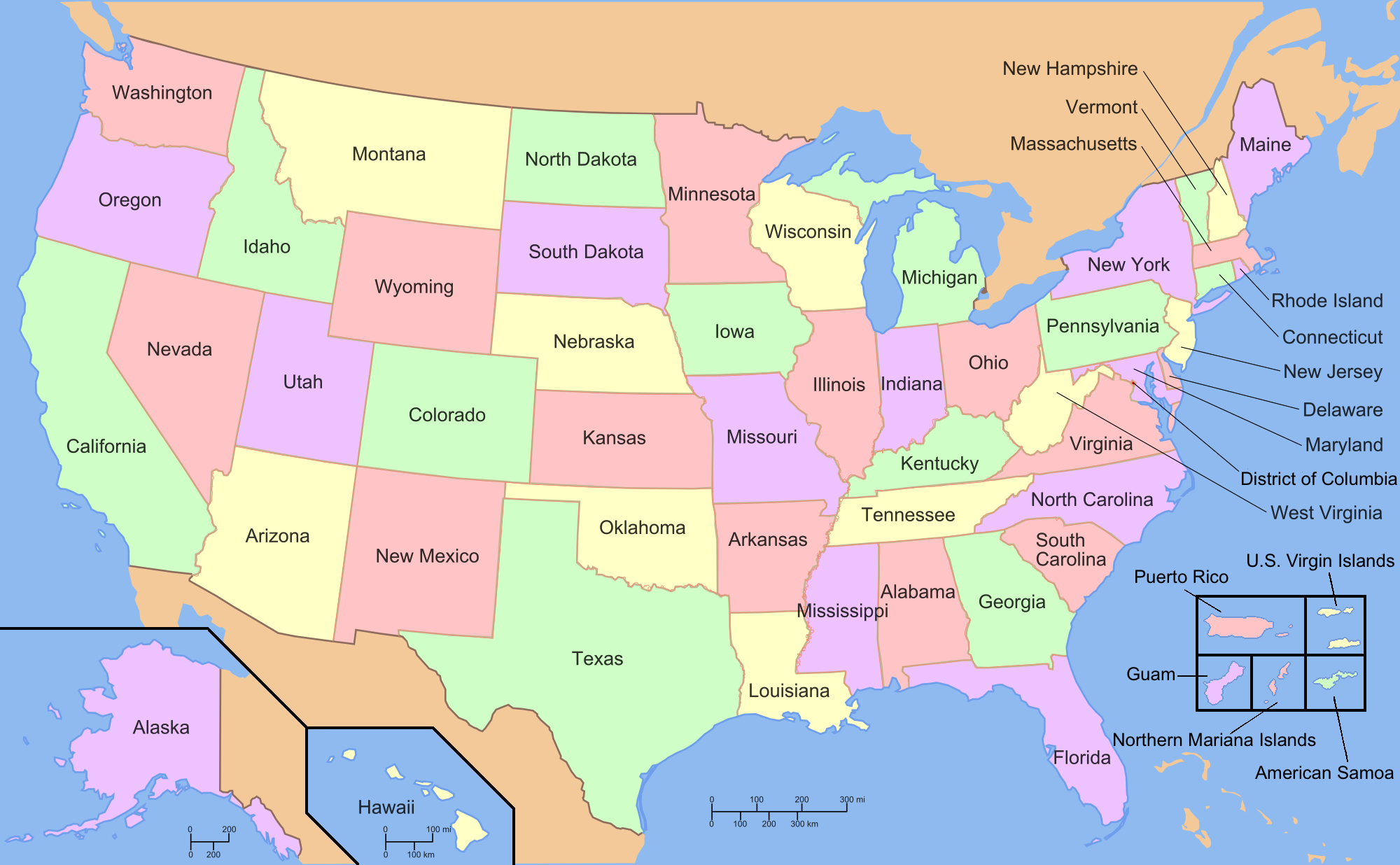
