= Maine Video Activists Network =

The Maine Video Activists Network (MVAN) was a monthly video newsreel produced by activists throughout the state of Maine in the United States. It was an extension of the Indymedia movement, in which grassroots organizers and average citizens produce their own media content and distribute it through non-commercial avenues such as the internet, Public-access television, print, and radio. In the spirit of highly subjective (yet non-commercial and non-corporate) journalism, MVAN produced material on a diverse range of topics: racial discrimination on college campuses, eco-terrorism legislation, anti-war activity, universal healthcare, low-income community organizing and direct action, union organizing, hate crimes, critical mass, disability rights, and student activism. The program was founded by video activists Craig Saddlemire and Ryan Conrad in Lewiston, Maine. MVAN regular received contributions from other producers in Biddeford, Freeport, Portland, and Madison. All of the work behind MVAN was done by unpaid volunteers and the show consistently aired on Democracy Player and Maine Public-access television stations from January 2006 to 2010.
