= Sicherheit und Frieden =

- Discipline: Political science, peace and conflict studies
- Language: German, English

Publication details
- History: 1983–present
- Publisher: Nomos (Germany)
- Frequency: Quarterly

Standard abbreviations
- ISO 4: Sicherh. Frieden

Indexing
- ISSN: 0175-274X

Links
- Journal homepage

Sicherheit und Frieden (English: Security and Peace) is a quarterly German academic journal focusing on peace research and security policy publishing articles in German and English. Since 2004 the journal also publishes peer-reviewed articles. The current editor-in-chief is Michael Brzoska (Institute for Peace Research and Security Policy, University of Hamburg).
