= Deanie Frazier =

American politician

Deanie Frazier in 1991

Willie Dean "Deanie" Frazier (October 30, 1950, in Savannah, Georgia – June 15, 2006) was the first African American woman sworn in under Judge Eugene Gadgsen as county commissioner in Savannah, and held the office of 5th district county commissioner for 14 years. She and Savannah civil-rights leader W.W. Law founded the Black Heritage Festival.

Deanie Frazier testified in support of Supreme Court Justice Clarence Thomas during the afternoon session of hearing day six, September 17, 1991. Joe Biden, Chairman of the United States Senate Committee on the Judiciary, congratulated and praised Ms. Frazier for being the only witness thus far to deliver their testimony within the allotted five minutes.

Personal Life - Born Willie Dean McCombs was born to Robbie McCombs Brown Whitlock ( Monroe Whitlock her bonus dad) Ham Brown. In 1970 Frazier married the love of her life " David Frazier" a Vietnam Vet" and Father to her 3 children David, Robin and Joy. They would be married for a life time. David, Robin, Joy would Produce 5 Grandchildren Mora Dean, Zoe Zenzelee, Lil Justin Jameson, Lil David Stephon Frazier III, LinsdeyDean.

== Honors ==
Mayor Otis Johnson, Mayor Van Johnson, community activist Pamela Greene, Mariam Pelote, Pastor Leonard Smalls, Yusef Shabazz, and Frazier's daughter-in-law Jeanine Brooks Frazier were instrumental in the restoration of her name to the Staley Avenue's bridge, now named Deanie Frazier's overpass. On August 9, 2007, Savannah city council honored Frazier by restoring her name to the Tatumville's community overpass by naming the bridge the "Deanie Frazier Overpass".
