= PIANZEA =

PIANZEA (Pacific Islands, Australia and New Zealand Electoral Administrators’ Network) is an organisation of electoral administrators in Oceania.

Network members include American Samoa, Australia, Cook Islands, Federated States of Micronesia, Fiji, French Polynesia, Guam, Kiribati, New Caledonia, New Zealand, Niue, Palau, Papua New Guinea, Samoa, Solomon Islands, Tonga, Vanuatu and Wallis and Futuna.
