= Anatopia =

1990s protest occupation in northwest Germany

Coordinates: 53.0560°N 7.5163°E

Anatopia was a land squat near to Papenburg, in the north west of Germany from 1991 until 1995. An anatopism is something that is out of its proper place. Similar protest occupations included Runway 18 West and the Free Republic of Wendland.

== Occupation ==
The site was squatted on 4 July, 1991, as an environmental protest action. Local people were concerned for the rare plants and animals, since the Daimler-Benz automobile company (Mercedes-Benz) intended to build a test track (12 km long, 3 km wide). The squatters lived off-the-grid without running water and heating with woodstoves. There was an infoshop and small-scale agriculture. They also lived a vegan lifestyle, eating communally every night.

== Eviction ==
The site was evicted 7 January, 1995 after a long struggle. It became the focus of anti-Mercedes protests throughout Germany. Solidarity actions were carried out in Berlin, Bielefeld, Bremen, Frankfurt, Greifswald, Hamburg, Hannover, Lübeck, Oldenburg, Osnabruck, Stuttgart and Wuppertal.
