= Election surprise =

An election surprise (also a pre-election surprise, or, in the U.S., October surprise, where elections are held on the first Tuesday after the first Monday of November) is an event which occurs preceding an election which has enough shock value that it may be able to sway voters in close elections. When planned, an election surprise may be an act of propaganda. Election surprises typically fall into categories such as terrorism, political scandals, etc.

There may be disagreement as to what constitutes an election surprise for several reasons:

- There may be general disagreement as to whether the event in question affected, or was intended to affect the outcome of the election, especially as the event and the election may occur in different countries.
- There may be a lack of consensus as to which party the election surprise may have helped, or was intended to help.
- The relative weight of a declaration, and the ability to catch on, help to distinguish true election surprises from minor events.
- What was a surprise for some of the population may have been obvious for another part (such as the total deaths accumulated in a military activity).
- The role a speech act, such as an expression of opinion/research could play. The documentary Hacking Democracy may not constitute an election surprise, whereas a statement issued by Osama bin Laden might.

Rumours of potential election surprises may also abound preceding an election.

The term "election surprise" may also be used to denote an election with a surprising outcome.

== List of possible election surprises ==
=== United States ===
- In October 1980, the Iranian Embassy Hostages preceding elections in United States on November 4, 1980, Ronald Reagan's election campaign manager William Casey, Laurence Silberman and George HW Bush went to Paris, France, and held a series of meetings with Iranian officials from October 15 to October 20, 1980 to discuss the fate of the 52 remaining hostages taken from the US embassy building in Tehran, Iran on November 4, 1979. Iranian officials agreed not to release the hostages prior to election day on November 4, 1980 in exchange for a shipment of F-4 Phantom II aircraft tires and spare parts supplied to Iran from Israel between October 21 and October 23, 1980 in contravention of the United States' boycott and the Trading with the Enemy Act. The 52 hostages were finally released after 444 days in captivity on the same day, at the same hour, that Ronald Reagan was sworn into office on January 20, 1981. The United States Congress eventually held hearings in 1991 led by Lee H. Hamilton on the matter, which were underreported in the media and widely considered to be a whitewash, and in which "no credible evidence" was found "linking Reagan's team to the delay of the hostages' release."
- A 1976 drunk driving citation on candidate George W. Bush was considered an election surprise for its suspicious timing, coming out one week before the 2000 US Presidential Election.
- Madrid train bombings on 11 March 2004, preceding elections in Spain on 14 March 2004. This led to the defeat of the sitting government subsequently leading to the Spanish withdraw from Iraq.
- The Killian documents, a faked set of papers provided to CBS News prior to the 2004 US Presidential Election were also considered an election surprise for the timing and negative propaganda value.
- Rep. Mark Foley (R-FL) admitted to sending explicit instant messages to underage pages on 29 September 2006, preceding mid-term elections in the United States on 7 November 2006. Democrats said that high-ranking members of the Republican Party in the House of Representatives may have known about the events.
- Saddam Hussein was found guilty of crimes against humanity on 5 November 2006, preceding mid-term elections in the United States on 7 November 2006.
