= Education Action Group =

Education Action Groups were set up at most New Zealand university campuses during the 1990s as a vehicle for direct action against user pays reforms to tertiary education. Most EAGs were semi-independent of their students' associations, but were mostly funded and worked closely with associations to help achieve their shared aims and policies of free quality education for all. EAGs and associations demanded a return to zero tertiary fees and a universal student living allowance.

At their height in the early to mid '90s national annual training and large student protests were organised (including bus trips of students from all around the country converging at parliament) culminating in the rolling occupations of several university registry buildings in 1996. Education regularly featured in the top 3 voters' concerns in election years during the 1990s.

Since 2001 the only active Education Action Group is at Victoria University (most active after introduction of Fee Maxima policy in 2003). At other students' associations it has become more common for student executives to try to run campaigns.

== Students' Associations associated with EAGs ==
- New Zealand Union of Students' Associations
- Victoria University of Wellington Students' Association
- Otago University Students' Association
- Massey University Students' Association
- Auckland University Students' Association
- University of Canterbury Students' Association
- Otago Polytechnic Students' Association
