= Probing amendment =

In legislative debate, a probing amendment is an amendment tabled by a legislator without the intention of seeing the amendment carried. The purpose of proposing the amendment is to provide an opportunity for discussion of a specific point.

Britain's former sectoral regulator for the telecommunications industry, Oftel, explains that "MPs may put down a probing amendment, which means they want to know what the Government's thinking is on a particular clause, rather than necessarily wanting to change the clause."

In Parliamentary systems the purpose of a probing amendment on a government-sponsored Bill can be to seek assurances from Ministers about the purpose of the legislation, or how the government intends to use powers given to it under the legislation. An assurance commonly sought is that the government will create Codes of Practice, or other rules with less than full legal force, to provide clarity and restraint not present on the face of the Bill.

In some legal systems the courts will use statements made in the legislature to interpret legislative intent, provided the statements are sufficiently precise and the legislation legitimately open to multiple constructions. In such systems, legislators sometimes table probing amendments to provide an opportunity that such statements of intent can be made with the requisite precision.
