= Interest aggregation =

Interest aggregation is the activity in which the political demands of groups and individuals are combined into policy programs, as defined by Almond, Powell, Dalton, and Strom.

Interest aggregation includes those methods employed by individuals to effect change, commonly called personal interest aggregation, or by groups, to seek the support of or make demands of the government.

== See also ==
- Interest group
- Party system
