= Islamic Thinkers Society =

- Abbreviation: ITS
- Headquarters: New York City, United States
- Ideology: Sunni Islamism
- International affiliation: Ahlus Sunnah wal Jamaah

Website
- www.islamicthinkers.com

The Islamic Thinkers Society (ITS) is an Islamist group based in New York City that seeks the goal of restoring the Islamic Caliphate to create what it calls "an ideal Islamic society". Its members are located mainly in Jackson Heights, Queens, New York City, United States. The ITS is an offshoot of Al-Muhajiroun, a pro Al-Qaeda British Islamic extremist group.

According to Michael Kenney, a scholar of Islamist extremism at the University of Pittsburgh, by 2014 the group had "fallen apart".

== Platform ==
The group states that it wishes to see a reversal of the Balfour Declaration, the Sykes-Picot Agreement and the San Remo conference. Its members allege that these agreements are part of 'Colonialist Designs' on the Islamic world, and they urge Muslims to consider them illegal, null and void. The group calls for an end to what it says are "Colonialist-Imposed Borders", "Colonialist-Imposed States", and "Colonialist-Imposed Rulers". Its members also show dislike for Jews, Christians, homosexuals and Shi'ites.

ITS calls on Muslims to oppose the United States, Christianity and Western society and culture, especially homosexuality, which it sees as Western. ITS is also notable for its hostility to Shi'ites whom its members view as not true Muslims.

== Controversy ==
ITS is suspected of being an American offshoot of the London-based Al-Muhajiroun, a group that celebrated the 9/11 attacks, referring to the hijackers as "the Magnificent 19", and posted a burning picture of the United States Capitol on its website. The Islamic Thinkers Society also used to fly the Al-Muhajiroun flag and distribute Al-Muhajiroun tracts. The Anti-Defamation League called ITS "a pseudonym or an offshoot of the British-based Al Muhajiroun, a now-disbanded radical Islamic group that supported terrorism and the imposition of Islamic hegemony worldwide."

In the CNN program ParkerSpitzer, the ex-leader of Al-Muhajiroun, Anjem Choudary, was interviewed with the title "heinous terrorist" and linked to militant groups like Al-Qaeda. Choudary however, denounced these allegations in a press release on his personal website. The ITS has also published a press release in response to the CNN interview supporting Al-Muhajiroun's former leader Anjem Choudary, but denouncing links to violence in a similar fashion, stating "as the struggle [of ITS] is always intellectual and political."

When the group still called itself Al-Muhajiroun, its members held an event at Queensborough Community College, during which an Al-Muhajiroun speaker said, "We reject the U.N., reject America, reject all law and order. Don't lobby Congress or protest because we don't recognize Congress! The only relationship you should have with America is to topple it!"

Observers such as the Intelligence Summit have called the Islamic Thinkers Society a Fundamentalist Islamic group.

== Activities ==
The group is based in the largely immigrant community of the Jackson Heights neighborhood in Queens, New York City but operates in the wider New York area. It is composed mainly of second-generation young Arab, Indian, Bangladeshi and Pakistani Muslim immigrants with a few converts.

=== 2005 ===
- On March 19, 2005, the organization protested the intergender Muslim service held at Synod House of the Cathedral of St. John the Divine. ITS members stood outside the service, irate that a woman was allowed to lead the ceremony.
- The group changed its name to the Islamic Thinkers Society and held a rally against Israel, co-sponsored by the Islamic Society of Bay Ridge, in New York City outside the Israeli mission to the United Nations on May 6, 2005. Placards were displayed which equated Nazi and Israeli symbols; other signs were emblazoned with the symbol of the Hamas militant group, and proclaimed that "Palestine is Islamic Land", "Allah Will Destroy the Terrorist State of Israel", and "Complete Liberation of Palestine From the Zionist Scum". One of the slogans shouted by the crowd in Arabic was the anti-Jewish slogan: "Khaibar, Khaibar ya Yahud, jaysh Muhammad sawfa ya'ud!" evoking the historical battle between the Islamic prophet Muhammad and the Jews of the Khaybar oasis.
- On March 23, 2004 a rally to mourn the death of the militant leader Sheikh Ahmed Yassin, the founder of the group Hamas, was also held in front of the Israeli consulate. The leader of the Islamic Society of Bay Ridge, Imam Red Shata, who was quoted by the New York Daily News, publicly stated, "The lion of Palestine has been martyred." In the same speech, he condemned all violence. he stated that "we don't hate Jews ...to kill one man is to kill all mankind."
- On June 8, 2005 the ITS publicly desecrated and ripped up an American flag on the street in New York City during a rally on 74th Street and 37th Avenue in the borough of Queens. This event, which its members called "Operation: Desecrate American Flag" was videotaped by the Islamic Thinkers Society and can be seen on the Internet. The group's five-minute video begins with a man speaking in English, "Just to show where our loyalty belongs to – you see this flag here? It's going to go on the floor [sic]. And to us, our loyalty does not belong to this flag, our loyalty belongs to Allah ... ." Another speaker refers to the mandate for "Islam to dominate over all other religions, to dominate the world, even though the non-Muslims may hate it."
- The negative reaction by the press led the organization to issue a statement on its website stating, "This flag also represents oppression, not only in the Muslim world, but also in other parts of the world which include but are not limited to South America, Vietnam, Japan & Africa. We would like to clarify that we DID NOT BURN THE FLAG as the rumors say. Rather, we stepped on it and ripped it. The video is evident of that. What we did was completely legal and protected by the American Constitutional Amendment." Flag desecration is allowed under the First Amendment to the United States Constitution.

=== 2006 ===
- On February 18, 2006, the Islamic Thinkers Society participated in a demonstration against Danish cartoons that portrayed the Muhammed as a terrorist. The rally, which was organized by the Muslim Leadership Council, brought over one thousand Muslims to protest the cartoons across from the Danish Consulate in Manhattan.
- On April 20, 2006, the ITS demonstrated in front of the Israeli consulate in Manhattan and publicly called for the nuclear destruction of Israel "The mushroom cloud is on its way! The real Holocaust is on its way!" and "Israel won't last long. Indeed, Allah will repeat the Holocaust right on the soil of Israel!" The demonstration included signs that read "Islam will Dominate" and featured a picture with an Islamic flag flying over the White House. A video of this event was also made available to the public on the Internet.
- On July 18, 2006, the ITS was again in front of the Israeli embassy with their signs, standing with a crowd that was chanting "Long live Hezbollah".

=== 2024 ===
On July 23, 2024 CBC and other Canadian media reported that a 28 year old Canadian man was charged under the U.K. terrorism act after his arrest at Heathrow Airport a week earlier. Canadian Khaled Hussein, 28, was arrested at London's Heathrow Airport on July 17, according to police, hours after Anjem Choudary, 56, a British citizen from east London, was arrested. Both men have now been charged under the U.K.'s terrorism act. The charges relate to the proscribed organization Al-Muhajiroun, also known as the Islamic Thinkers Society. In a media statement, Scotland Yard said Hussein, 28, is from Edmonton and Choudary, 56, is a British citizen from east London. According to multiple British media reports, Choudary is a well-known radical Islamic preacher who has been convicted of aiding ISIS.

== See also ==
- 2004 Attempted Subway Bomb
- Danish Cartoons controversy
