= Regenesis (non-profit organization) =

- Formation: 2007 (2009 Incorporation)
- Type: non-profit organization, environmental organization
- Purpose: sustainability#External_links
- Headquarters: Toronto, Ontario
- Location: Canada
- Executive Directors: Wanita Jagdesh and Michael Jodah
- Website: www.regenesis.eco

Regenesis is Canadian youth and young adult-focused environmental organization. Regenesis has chapters at university and college campuses across Canada. Each university chapter is independent and democratically run.

Regenesis was founded in Toronto, Ontario, Canada, in 2007 by a group of student as a youth-focused environmental organization.

Regenesis has been praised for its innovative approach of involving students in operating social enterprises and other long-term environmental initiatives.

== History ==
Regenesis was formed as a grassroots youth organization and aspiring student social movement focusing on environmental issues. Projects are determined by their membership. The group had initial success, founding chapters at universities across Canada, including several chapters in Alberta, British Columbia and Ontario. Regenesis held a launch party that took place on World Environment Day, June 5, 2008, that was hosted by Frank De Jong, leader of the Green Party of Ontario.

Regenesis chapters currently host a variety of initiatives, including farmers' markets, borrowing centres, free stores and a community bike centre.

== Chapters ==
Regenesis has chapters at the following post-secondary institutions:

- Carleton University
- Toronto Metropolitan University
- University of British Columbia (Okanagan and Vancouver)
- University of Toronto (Mississauga, Scarborough, and St. George)
- York University (and Glendon College)
