= Global Power Barometer =

The Global Power Barometer (GPB) is a tool that measures which nations, ideologies or movements are most powerful based on how successfully they influence global opinion and events.

== About ==
Located on PostGlobal, washingtonpost.com and Newsweek.com's panel blog on international issues, the Global Power Barometer (GPB) is a visual monitor updated each weekday by the research firm Denver Research Group, Inc. (DRGI) using a weighted sample of sources from the media, academia, governments, and NGOs from around the world. The GPB offers an indication of the most powerful nations and ideologies on any given day. PostGlobal is hosted by journalists Fareed Zakaria and David Ignatius.

== Transparency in reporting ==
Clicking on "Decoding Today's Chart" takes you to a bulleted explanation of the observations and drivers for the current chart, as well as archived paragraphs from earlier days and weeks. Clicking on an individual country or group on the chart displays a representative sample of sources used in determining the power shift for that day.

== Looking at What's Next ==
As it tracks and analyzes information from across the world, the GPB often comes across issues that the PostGlobal branch of DRGI thinks will impact global politics. These are the issues that likely will move the icons in coming weeks. The "What's Next" button lets a reader access "Emerging Issues", which is a listing of issues, players, events, political intrigues or other items that the PostGlobal team believes may become important in coming days or weeks.

== Tracking movements ==
The reader can click on the time bar at the top of the chart to watch movement of the icons over the current week. Clicking on any of the dates stops the chart at that specific date. The movement in previous weeks can also be viewed by clicking "Other Weeks".
