= Horseshoe theory =

Posited similarity of the far-left and far-right in politics

Proponents of horseshoe theory argue that the far-left and the far-right are closer to each other than either is to the political centre.

In popular discourse, the horseshoe theory asserts that advocates of the far-left and the far-right, rather than being at opposite and opposing ends of a linear continuum of the political spectrum, closely resemble each other, analogous to the way that the opposite ends of a horseshoe are close together. The theory is attributed to the French philosopher Jean-Pierre Faye in his 1972 book Théorie du récit: introduction aux langages totalitaires, in relation to Otto Strasser.

Proponents point to a number of real and perceived similarities between the two extremes, such as tendencies to see politics in unambiguous and stereotypical terms; an "us vs. them" view of the world; holding confidently on to simplified views of the world; distrusting "authorities" and "elites"; and intense hostility towards those who hold other views. Peer-reviewed research on the subject have found mixed support for horseshoe theory.

== Origin ==
The horseshoe metaphor was used during the Weimar Republic to describe the ideology of the Black Front. The later use of the term in political theory was seen in Le Siècle des idéologies. Faye's book discussed the use of ideologies (he said that ideology is a pair of Greek words that were joined in French) that he argued are rooted in philosophy by totalitarian regimes with specific reference to Friedrich Nietzsche, Adolf Hitler, Karl Marx, and Joseph Stalin; for instance, Faye used the horseshoe metaphor to describe the political position of German political parties, from the Communist Party of Germany to the Nazi Party, in 1932.

Others have attributed the theory, also called the centrist/extremist theory and sometimes referred to as the Pluralist School, as having come from the American sociologists Seymour Martin Lipset and Daniel Bell, and others who became part of the neoconservative movement in the United States. According to critics, who formed complex social movement theories in response, horseshoe theory is a legacy of Cold War liberal politics. Because the theory is also popular in Germany, a co-contributor to the theory is the German political scientist Eckhard Jesse.

== Modern use ==
In his 2006 book, Where Did the Party Go?, the American political scientist Jeff Taylor wrote: "It may be more useful to think of the Left and the Right as two components of populism, with elitism residing in the Center. The political spectrum may be linear, but it is not a straight line. It is shaped like a horseshoe." Twenty years later, Taylor presented a detailed explanation of the horseshoe theory, in the form of an academic paper, at a conference at Creighton University.

In 2006, the term "horseshoe theory" was used in discussing a resurgent hostility toward Jews and a new antisemitism from both the far left and the far right. In an essay from 2008, Josef Joffe, a visiting fellow at the Hoover Institution, an American conservative think tank, wrote:

Will globalisation survive the gloom? The creeping revolt against globalisation actually preceded the Crash of '08. Everywhere in the West, populism began to show its angry face at mid-decade. The two most dramatic instances were Germany and Austria, where populist parties scored big with a message of isolationism, protectionism and redistribution. In Germany, it was left-wing populism ("Die Linke"); in Austria it was a bunch of right-wing parties that garnered almost 30% in the 2008 election. Left and right together illustrated once more the "horseshoe" theory of modern politics: As the iron is bent backward, the two extremes almost touch.

In a 2015 article for The Daily Beast, "The Left's Witch Hunt Against Muslims", the reformist Muslim Maajid Nawaz invoked the horseshoe theory while lamenting what he perceived to be a common tendency on both extremes toward blacklisting, such as the McCarthyist compiling and publishing of "lists of our political foes". He wrote:

As the political horseshoe theory attributed to Jean-Pierre Faye highlights, if we travel far-left enough, we find the very same sneering, nasty and reckless bully-boy tactics used by the far-right. The two extremes of the political spectrum end up meeting like a horseshoe, at the top, which to my mind symbolises totalitarian control from above. In their quest for ideological purity, Stalin and Hitler had more in common than modern neo-Nazis and far-left agitators would care to admit.

In a 2018 article for Eurozine, "How Right Is the Left?", political scientist Kyrylo Tkachenko outlined his view that a common cause had emerged recently between both extremes in Ukraine. He said:

The pursuit of a common political agenda is a trend discernible at both extremes of the political spectrum. Though this phenomenon manifests itself primarily through content-related overlaps, I believe there are good reasons to refer to it as a red-brown alliance. Its commonalities are based on shared anti-liberal resentment. Of course, there remain palpable differences between far left and the far right. But we should not underestimate the dangers already posed by these left-right intersections, as well as what we might lose if the resentment-driven backlash becomes mainstream.

In "Let's Play Horseshoe Theory", a 2021 article in Reason, a US libertarian magazine, its editor-in-chief Katherine Mangu-Ward wrote:

The [horseshoe] theory is typically used to explain why 20th century communists and fascists seemed to have so much in common, though it likely predates the last century. But in the United States in 2021, a softer version of this iron law is at play, with the centre-left and the centre-right mushily converging toward expensive authoritarian policies that look astonishingly similar despite their supposedly opposite goals. Still a horseshoe, but more like one of the marshmallow ones you can find in bowls of Lucky Charms.

In a December 2022 article for The Atlantic, "The Crunchy-to-Alt-Right Pipeline", examining the connections between "natural-food-and-body community and white-power and militant-right online spaces", historian Kathleen Belew wrote that an examination of documents connected with the White power movement indicated that a horseshoe is not quite right as a visual metaphor for the relationship of the far-left and the far-right; that, in fact, the archive showed that it was more like a circle, at least in the specific case she examined. The theory has also been cited when referring to the support given to the Russian invasion of Ukraine by notable American far-right and far-left groups. The probability of autocratisation in the year following an election shows a horseshoe behaviour along the economic left–right axis, but not along the cultural dimension.

In February 2024, the far-right British former BNP leader Nick Griffin endorsed far-left Workers Party of Britain leader George Galloway, urging voters to 'stick two fingers up to the rotten political elite and their fake news media cronies'. The Spectator described this as the perfect example of horseshoe theory. George Galloway ended up losing his seat.

=== Antisemitism and horseshoe theory ===
A 2024 study by Hannes Zacher and Meir Shemla examined political attitudes toward Israel in Germany following the October 7, 2023 attacks by Hamas. The authors found evidence consistent with Horseshoe theory, with individuals at both the far-left and far-right ends of the political spectrum expressing more negative attitudes toward Israel than those with moderate political views. The study also reported that stronger anti-Israel attitudes were associated, in some cases, with higher levels of antisemitic beliefs. However, the authors emphasised that criticism of Israel does not necessarily constitute antisemitism, and that the relationship varies depending on the nature and intensity of the views expressed. A publication by the United States Department of State argues that antisemitism occurs across the political spectrum, including on the far right, far left, and among extremist ideological and religious groups. It states that while right-wing antisemitism has historically been prominent, contemporary forms also appear in left-wing and anti-Zionist movements, as well as in some Islamist ideologies. The report highlights that these differing forms of antisemitism may draw on distinct narratives and justifications, but can converge in hostility toward Jewish people and institutions.

In an opinion piece for Jewish News Syndicate, Josh Warhit argues that, on the illiberal far right, Jewish identity is viewed as incompatible with notions of a fixed and unchanging nation, while on the illiberal far left, Jewish continuity is sometimes portrayed as conflicting with ideals of global progress toward a more uniform, universal collective. Though he contends that the Horseshoe theory is often used as an oversimplified explanation for antisemitism across the political spectrum. However, he maintains that while both far-left and far-right movements can produce similar anti-Jewish narratives, this framework overlooks broader ideological and historical factors. He suggests that antisemitism arises from deeper intellectual and cultural traditions within modern political thought, and that it can emerge not only at ideological extremes but also within mainstream liberal perspectives, particularly during periods of political and social instability.

In an article for Vision, Shai Hershel argues that Horseshoe theory oversimplifies the relationship between political extremes and antisemitism. The author contends that, although antisemitic rhetoric can appear on both the far right and far left, the underlying ideological motivations differ significantly and should not be treated as equivalent. The article highlights examples of contemporary figures such as Candace Owens and Tucker Carlson on the right, and Hasan Piker on the left, arguing that their statements illustrate how similar themes may emerge across the spectrum while rooted in distinct political frameworks. Hershel concludes that focusing solely on a “horseshoe” convergence risks obscuring the specific historical, cultural, and ideological sources of antisemitism in different political contexts.

== Academic studies and criticism ==
The horseshoe theory is not widely supported within academic circles; peer-reviewed research by political scientists on the subject is scarce, and existing studies and comprehensive reviews have often contradicted its central premises, or found only limited support for the theory under certain conditions. A 2011 study about the far-left and the far-right within the context of the 2007 French presidential election concluded: "Divergent social and political logics explain the electoral support for these two candidates: their voters do not occupy the same political space, they do not have the same social background, and they do not hold the same values." A 2012 study concluded: "The present results thus do not corroborate the idea that adherents to extreme ideologies on the left-wing and right-wing sides resemble each other but instead support the alternative perspective that different extreme ideologies attract different people. In other words, extremists should be distinguished on the basis of the ideology to which they adhere, and there is no universal extremist type that feels at home in any extreme ideology." A 2019 study concluded that "our findings suggest that speaking of 'extreme left-wing values' or 'extreme right-wing values' may not be meaningful, as members of both groups are heterogeneous in the values that they endorse." A 2022 study about antisemitism concluded: "On all items, the far left has lower agreement with these statements relative to moderates, and the far right has higher agreement with these statements compared to moderates. Contrary to a 'horseshoe' theory, the evidence reveals increasing antisemitism moving from left to right." Paul H. P. Hanel, a research associate at the University of Essex, et al. summarised some of those studies. They wrote:

Likewise, some even argue that all extremists, across the political left and right, in fact, support similar policies, in a view known as 'horseshoe theory'. However, not only do recent studies fail to support such beliefs, they also contradict them ... Van Hiel also found that left-wing respondents reported significantly lower endorsement of values associated with conservation, self-enhancement, and anti-immigration attitudes compared to both moderate and right-wing activists, with individuals on the right reporting greater endorsement of such values and attitudes ... Overall, van Hiel provided evidence demonstrating that Western European extremist groups are far from being homogenous, and left- and right-wing groups represent distinct ideologies.

Several scholars dismissed the theory as an oversimplification and generalisation that ignores their fundamental differences, and have questioned the theory's general premises, citing significative differences of the left and right on the political spectrum and governance. Chip Berlet, an expert on right-wing movements, has dismissed perceived far-left–far-right flirtations as an oversimplification of political ideologies, ignoring fundamental differences between them. In a 2000 book about the radical right in the United States, Right-Wing Populism in America: Too Close for Comfort, he and Matthew N. Lyons, another expert on right-wing movements, dismissed both the claim that the far-right's role in the 1999 Seattle protests was significant, and a Southern Poverty Law Center report that "relied heavily on centrist/extremist analysis". Within the context of the anti-globalisation movement, they also mentioned that those on the political left were concerned about the far-right infiltrating anti-World Trade Organization groups, including those led by centrist liberals and social democrats that did not want to be associated with "right-wing nationalists and bigots". Some, such as the Peoples' Global Action, responded to this perceived threat by amending their manifestos to specifically reject alliances with any right-wing groups, on principle.

In a 2014 paper, Vassilis Pavlopoulos, a professor in social psychology at the University of Athens, argued: "The so-called centrist/extremist or horseshoe theory points to notorious similarities between the two extremes of the political spectrum (e.g., authoritarianism). It remains alive though many sociologists consider it to have been thoroughly discredited (Berlet & Lyons, 2000). Furthermore, the ideological profiles of the two political poles have been found to differ considerably (Pavlopoulos, 2013). The centrist/extremist hypothesis narrows civic political debate and undermines progressive organising. Matching the neo-Nazi with the radical left leads to the legitimisation of far-right ideology and practices."

Simon Choat, a senior lecturer in political theory at Kingston University, has criticised the horseshoe theory. In a 2017 article for The Conversation, "'Horseshoe theory' is nonsense – the far right and far left have little in common", he argues that far-left and far-right ideologies only share similarities in the vaguest sense, in that they both oppose the liberal democratic status quo, but that the two sides have very different reasons and very different aims for doing so. Choat uses the issue of globalisation as an example; both the far-left and the far-right attack neoliberal globalisation and its "elites", but identify different elites and have conflicting reasons for attacking them. Additionally, Choat argues that although proponents of the horseshoe theory may cite historical examples of alleged collusion between fascists and communists, those on the far-left usually oppose the rise of far-right or fascist regimes in their countries. Instead, he argues that it has been centrists who have supported far-right and fascist regimes and have preferred them in power over socialists, and that the horseshoe theory is biased towards centrists, who he says use it to smear or attack the left more than the right. He cites the example of the 2016 United States presidential election and the 2017 French presidential election, in which supporters of Bernie Sanders and Jean-Luc Mélenchon were alleged to have preferred or voted for Donald Trump and Marine Le Pen. In this sense, he argues that the horseshoe theory is used to engage in red-baiting or reductio ad Hitlerum, which allows them to "discredit the left while disavowing their own complicity with the far right." Choat says that "it is patently absurd to compare Stalin to present-day leftists like Mélenchon or Corbyn", and concludes: "If liberals genuinely want to understand and confront the rise of the far right, then rather than smearing the left they should perhaps reflect on their own faults."

While formal academic or journalistic analysis of horseshoe theory is fairly recent, criticism of its antecedents is long-standing, and a frequent basis for criticism has been the tendency of commentators to group disparate opposing movements together. As early as 1938, Marxist theorist and politician Leon Trotsky wrote "Their Morals and Ours", which became the basis for his 1939 book, Their Morals and Ours: Marxist Versus Liberal Views on Morality. In the 1938 article, which was first published in the United States by the theoretical journal of the Socialist Workers Party of the International Left Opposition, he wrote:

The fundamental feature of [arguments comparing disparate political movements] lies in their completely ignoring the material foundation of the various currents, that is, their class nature and by that token their objective historical role. Instead they evaluate and classify different currents according to some external and secondary manifestation ... To Hitler, liberalism and Marxism are twins because they ignore 'blood and honour'. To a democrat, fascism and Bolshevism are twins because they do not bow before universal suffrage ... Different classes in the name of different aims may in certain instances utilise similar means. Essentially it cannot be otherwise. Armies in combat are always more or less symmetrical; were there nothing in common in their methods of struggle they could not inflict blows upon each other.

== See also ==
- Antinomy – Term in philosophy
- Argument to moderation – Informal fallacy that the truth is always a compromise
- Comparison of Nazism and Stalinism – Comparison of totalitarian ideologies
- Inglehart–Welzel cultural map of the world – Scatter plots of several countries's societies
- Left–right political spectrum – System of classifying political positions
- Neutrality – Tendency not to side in a conflict
- Nolan Chart – Political spectrum diagram
- Open–closed political spectrum – Alternative to the left-right political spectrum
- Overton window – Range of ideas tolerated in public discourse
- Paradox of tolerance – Logical paradox in decision-making theory
- Splitting (psychology), also known as black-and-white thinking – Failure to think in nuances
- The Political Compass – Political self-test
- Unity of opposites – Central category of dialectics
