= The Political Compass =

Political self-test

- Website type: Political self-test, political blog
- Available in: English, Bulgarian, Czech, German, Spanish, French, Italian, Persian, Polish, Portuguese, Romanian, Russian, Turkish, Slovene
- Creator: Wayne Brittenden
- Editor: Wayne Brittenden
- Website: politicalcompass.org
- Commercial: No
- Registration: No
- Launched: 20 December 2000; 25 years ago
- Current status: Active

The Political Compass is a website soliciting responses to a set of 62 propositions in order to rate political ideology in a spectrum with two axes: one about economic policy (left–right) and another about social policy (authoritarian–libertarian).

== History ==
The Political Compass website was established by political journalist Wayne Brittenden. Bearing similarities to the Nolan chart, the Political Compass is distinguished from it and other predecessors by aligning political opinions to the vertical and horizontal axes instead of the diagonals.

On July 2, 2001, an early version of the website appeared on the web server of One World Action. The creators of The Political Compass acknowledged intellectual influences such as Wilhelm Reich and Theodor Adorno for their contributions to the field.

== Political model ==
Version of a political compass as used by The Political Compass

The underlying theory of the political model used by The Political Compass is that political ideology may be better measured along two separate, independent axes. The economic (left–right) axis measures one's opinion of how the economy should be run. In economic terms, the political left is defined as the desire for the economy to be run by a cooperative collective agency, which can mean a sovereign state but also a network of communes, while the political right is defined as the desire for the economy to be left to the devices of competing individuals and organizations. The test's propositions lead the individual taking the test to reflect on issues such as "Is military action that defies international law sometimes justified?", "Should mothers have demanding careers?", "If economic globalisation is inevitable, should it primarily serve humanity or multinational corporations?"

The other axis (authoritarian–libertarian) measures one's political opinions in a social sense, regarding the amount of personal freedom that one would allow. Libertarianism is defined as the belief that personal freedom should be maximised, while authoritarianism is defined as the belief that authority should be obeyed. This makes it possible to divide the political landscape into four colour-marked quadrants: authoritarian left (red in the top left), authoritarian right (blue in the top right), libertarian right (yellow or purple in the bottom right), and libertarian left (green in the bottom left). The makers of the Political Compass say that the quadrants "are not separate categories, but regions on a continuum".

== Reception ==
Several prominent individuals in academia and media have voiced criticisms of the Political Compass test.

The academic William Clifton van der Linden says that the Political Compass uses a method called dimensionality reduction to try to make its results more dependable. According to him, dimensionality reduction is a practice that is "roundly criticized" by scholars because it fails to give accurate results. Van der Linden uses scholarly sources to support his analysis of the reliability of voting advice applications, such as the Political Compass. These sources include research by Gemenis and Kostas (2013) from Acta Politica, Otjes and Louwerse (2014) from Electoral Studies, and Germann, Mendez, Wheatley, and Serdült (2015) from Acta Politica.

Daniel J. Mitchell, a Libertarian economist for Foundation for Economic Education, critiques the Political Compass Test for its placement of historical figures and politicians, such as Adolf Hitler being classified on the left side of the horizontal axis and Margaret Thatcher's proximity to Joseph Stalin and Hitler on the vertical axis. He also expresses disappointment with his own placement, feeling he should have scored stronger on the right for economic issues and more libertarian on social issues. Mitchell disagrees with the test's placement of well-known individuals, such as Milton Friedman being rated as less libertarian on economics and Benito Mussolini being placed as far right, while Mitchell says that he opposed capitalism. He finds Hillary Clinton's classification as right-leaning on economic policy and Donald Trump being ranked as more authoritarian than Robert Mugabe, Mao Zedong, and Fidel Castro to be nonsensical.

Encyclopedia Britannica has highlighted that the scientific basis for these models has frequently been questioned. Specifically, the Political Compass has faced criticism for allegedly propagating libertarian ideas.

Author Brian Patrick Mitchell takes issue with the positioning of ideologies and the framing of economic freedom on the horizontal axis. Mitchell criticizes the political compass for placing American libertarians on the far right of the economic freedom scale, suggesting it implies economic freedom is solely linked with right-wing ideology. He also questions the accuracy of the compass's representation of ideologies, highlighting the possibility of communal fascism in the upper left and neoliberal fascism in the upper right, which he believes oversimplifies complex political ideologies.

British journalist Tom Utley criticizes the phrasing of some questions on the test, finding them irritating and difficult to answer accurately. He highlights the complexity of political views and the inadequacy of condensing them into simplistic labels. He cites an example of that he identifies as libertarian Right on the political compass, placing him in a similar position to Charles Kennedy, despite their ideological differences.

=== Similar models ===
Several other multi-axis models of the political spectrum exist, sharing similarities with The Political Compass. One notable example is the Nolan Chart, devised by American libertarian David Nolan. Additionally, comparable charts were presented in Albert Meltzer and Stuart Christie's "The Floodgates of Anarchy" in 1970, and in the Rampart Journal of Individualist Thought by Maurice C. Bryson and William R. McDill in 1968.

In 2017, students at Peking University launched the Chinese Political Compass, which they modeled on The Political Compass's approach. The program collects data at the IP level of cities and has been used by data analysts to measure dimensions of political ideology among respondents.

=== Reddit ===
r/PoliticalCompassMemes is a subreddit dedicated to humorous criticism of ideologies, where users identify their ideologies with user flairs based on The Political Compass. In June 2022, the subreddit was used in a study by researchers at Monash University to predict users' political ideologies based on their digital footprints.

== See also ==
- Cleavage (politics)
- F-scale (personality test)
- Left–right political spectrum
- List of political ideologies
- NationStates
- Semiotic square
