= Pournelle chart =

Political classification system

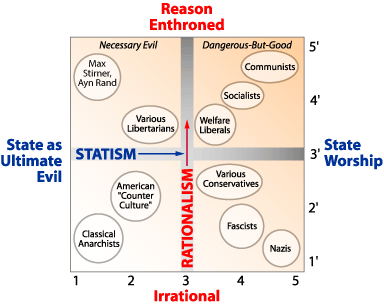
The Pournelle chart

The Pournelle chart, developed by Jerry Pournelle in his 1963 political science Ph.D. dissertation, is a two-dimensional coordinate system which can be used to distinguish political ideologies. It is similar to the political compass and the Nolan Chart in that it is a two-dimensional chart, but the axes of the Pournelle chart are different from those of other systems. The two axes are as follows:

- The x-axis, "Attitude toward the State" (labeled statism), refers to a political philosophy's attitude toward the state and centralized government. The furthest right is "state worship" and the furthest left represents the state as the "ultimate evil", preferring individual freedom.
- The y-axis, "Attitude toward planned social progress" (labeled rationalism), refers to the extent which a political philosophy is compatible with the idea that social problems can be solved by the use of reason. The top indicates complete confidence in planned social progress and the bottom represents skepticism of such methods, often considering them as naively utopian. Those at the top of the axis would tend to discard a traditional custom if they do not understand what purpose it serves (considering it antiquated and probably useless), while those at the bottom would tend to keep the custom (considering it time-tested and probably useful).

Pournelle arranged American liberalism, socialism, and communism, in the upper right-hand quadrant of high state control and high rationalism. Conservatism, fascism, and Nazism are placed in the lower right-hand quadrant of high state control and low rationalism. Classical anarchists are in the lower left-hand corner of low state control and low rationalism. Libertarians (including anarcho-capitalists) and Objectivists are placed in the upper left-hand corner of low state control and high rationalism. Each diagonal axis contains natural political allies.

== See also ==
- Political spectrum
