= Political spectrum =

Visual analogy for political or ideological positions

A political spectrum is a system to characterize and classify different political positions in relation to one another. These positions are typically placed on one or more geometric axes that represent independent political dimensions. The expressions political compass and political map are used to refer to the political spectrum as well, especially to popular two-dimensional models of it.

Most long-standing spectra include the left–right dimension as a measure of social, political, and economic hierarchy which originally referred to seating arrangements in the French parliament after the Revolution (1789–1799), with radicals on the left and aristocrats on the right. While communism and socialism are usually regarded internationally as being on the left, conservatism and reactionism are generally regarded as being on the right. Liberalism can mean different things in different contexts, being sometimes on the left (social liberalism) and other times on the right (conservative liberalism or classical liberalism). Those with an intermediate outlook are sometimes classified as centrists or moderates. Politics that rejects the conventional left–right spectrum is often known as syncretic politics. This form of politics has been criticized for tending to mischaracterize positions that have a logical location on a two-axis spectrum because they seem randomly brought together on a one-axis left–right spectrum.

Several political scientists have noted that a single left–right axis is too simplistic and insufficient for describing the existing variation in political beliefs and include other axes to compensate for this problem. Although the descriptive words at polar opposites may vary, the axes of popular biaxial spectra are usually split between economic issues (on a left–right dimension) and socio-cultural issues (on an authority–liberty dimension).

== Historical origin of the terms ==
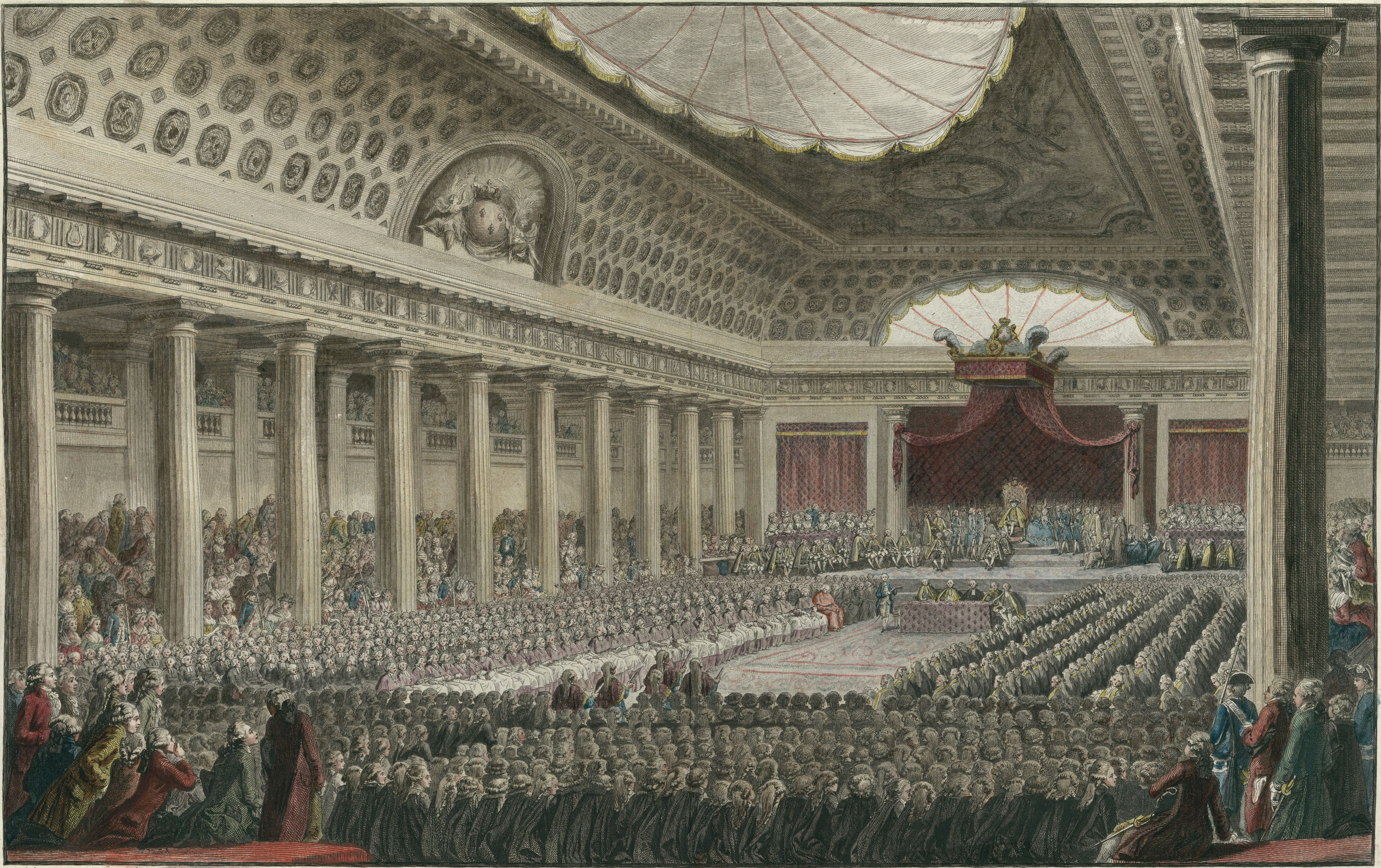
The 5 May 1789 opening of the Estates General of 1789 in Versailles

The terms right and left refer to political affiliations originating early in the French Revolutionary era of 1789–1799 and referred originally to the seating arrangements in the various legislative bodies of France. As seen from the Speaker's seat at the front of the Assembly, the aristocracy sat on the right (traditionally the seat of honor) and the commoners sat on the left, hence the terms right-wing politics and left-wing politics.

Originally, the defining point on the ideological spectrum was the Ancien Régime ("old order"). "The Right" thus implied support for aristocratic or royal interests and the church, while "The Left" implied support for republicanism, secularism and civil liberties.

== Academic investigation ==
For almost a century, social scientists have considered the problem of how to best describe political variation.

=== Leonard W. Ferguson ===
In 1950, Leonard W. Ferguson analyzed political values using ten scales measuring attitudes toward: birth control, capital punishment, censorship, communism, evolution, law, patriotism, theism, treatment of criminals and war. After submitting the results to factor analysis, he identified three factors, which he named religionism, humanitarianism and nationalism. He defined religionism as belief in God and negative attitudes toward evolution and birth control; humanitarianism as being related to attitudes opposing war, capital punishment and harsh treatment of criminals; and nationalism as describing variation in opinions on censorship, law, patriotism and communism.

This system was derived empirically, rather than from a political model devised purely on theoretical grounds and testing it, Ferguson's research was exploratory. As a result of this method, care must be taken in the interpretation of Ferguson's three factors, as factor analysis will output an abstract factor whether an objectively real factor exists or not. Although replication of the nationalism factor was inconsistent, the finding of religionism and humanitarianism had a number of replications by Ferguson and others.

=== Hans Eysenck ===
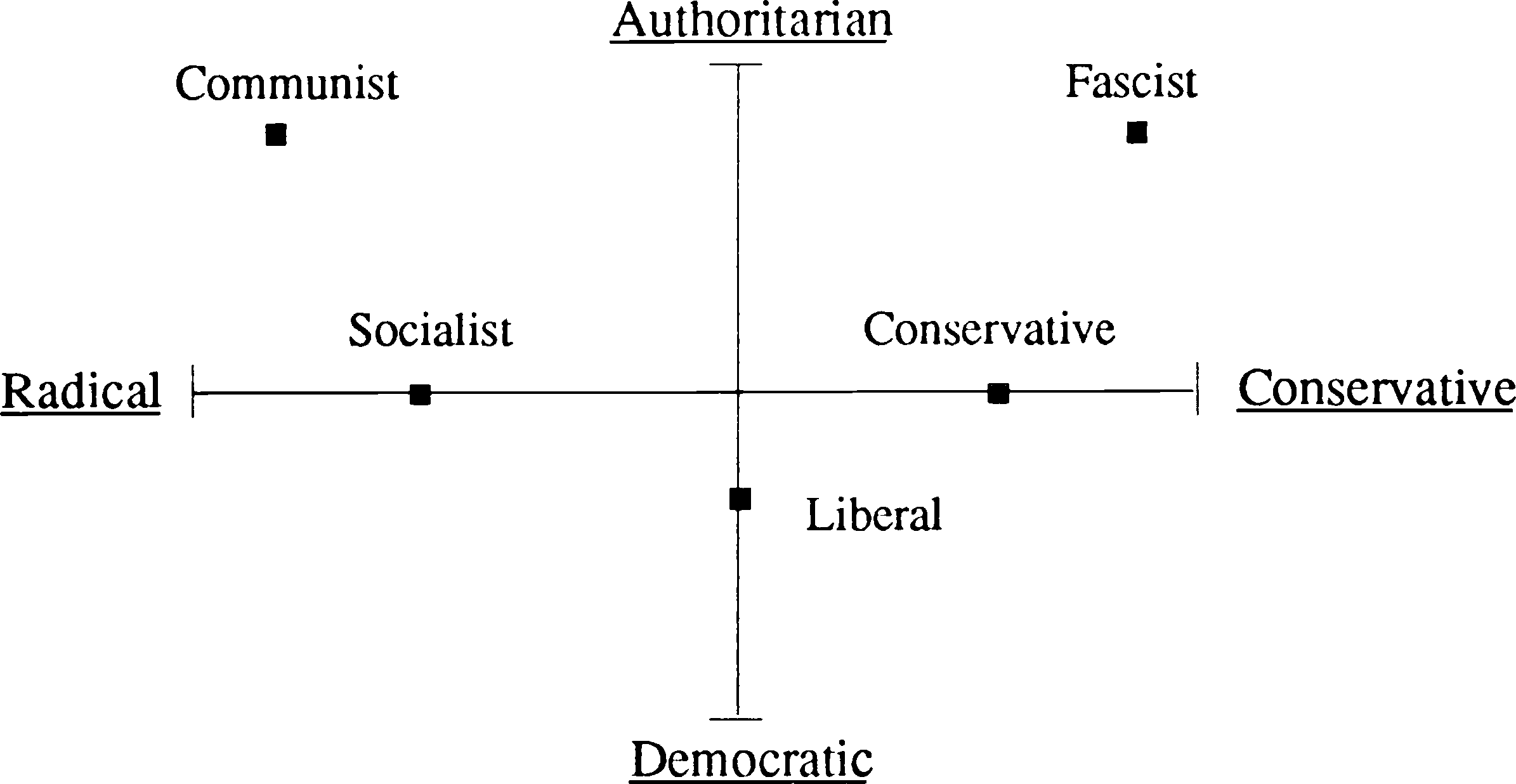
Diagram of the political spectrum according to Hans Eysenck

Shortly afterward, Hans Eysenck began researching political attitudes in the United Kingdom. He believed that there was something essentially similar about the fascism of the National Socialists (Nazis) on the one hand and the communists on the other, despite their opposite positions on the left–right axis. As Hans Eysenck described in his 1956 book Sense and Nonsense in Psychology, Eysenck compiled a list of political statements found in newspapers and political tracts and asked subjects to rate their agreement or disagreement with each. Submitting this value questionnaire to the same process of factor analysis used by Ferguson, Eysenck drew out two factors, which he named "Radicalism" (R-factor) and "Tender-Mindedness" (T-factor).

Such analysis produces a factor whether or not it corresponds to a real-world phenomenon and so caution must be exercised in its interpretation. While Eysenck's R-factor is easily identified as the classical "left–right" dimension, the T-factor (representing a factor drawn at right angles to the R-factor) is less intuitive, as high-scorers favored pacifism, racial equality, religious education and restrictions on abortion, while low-scorers had attitudes more friendly to militarism, harsh punishment, easier divorce laws and companionate marriage.

According to social scientist Bojan Todosijevic, radicalism was defined as positively viewing evolution theory, strikes, welfare state, mixed marriages, student protests, law reform, women's liberation, United Nations, nudist camps, pop-music, modern art, immigration, abolishing private property, and rejection of patriotism. Conservatism was defined as positively viewing white superiority, birching, death penalty, antisemitism, opposition to nationalization of property, and birth control. Tender-mindedness was defined by moral training, inborn conscience, Bible truth, chastity, self-denial, pacifism, anti-discrimination, being against the death penalty and harsh treatment of criminals. Tough-mindedness was defined by compulsory sterilization, euthanasia, easier divorce laws, racism, antisemitism, compulsory military training, wife swapping, casual living, death penalty, and harsh treatment of criminals.

Despite the difference in methodology, location and theory, the results attained by Eysenck and Ferguson matched. Simply rotating Eysenck's two factors 45 degrees renders the same factors of religionism and humanitarianism identified by Ferguson in America.

Eysenck's dimensions of R and T were found by factor analyses of values in Germany and Sweden, France and Japan.

One notable result identified by Eysenck in his 1956 work was that in the United States and the United Kingdom, most of the political variance was subsumed by the left/right axis, while in France the T-axis was larger and in the Middle East the only dimension to be found was the T-axis: "Among mid-Eastern Arabs it has been found that while the tough-minded/tender-minded dimension is still clearly expressed in the relationships observed between different attitudes, there is nothing that corresponds to the radical-conservative continuum".

==== Relationship between Eysenck's political views and political research ====
Eysenck's political views related to his research: Eysenck was an outspoken opponent of what he perceived as the authoritarian abuses of the left and right, and accordingly he believed that with this T axis he had found the link between Nazism and communism. According to Eysenck, members of both ideologies were tough-minded. Central to Eysenck's thesis was the claim that tender-minded ideologies were democratic and friendly to human freedoms, while tough-minded ideologies were aggressive and authoritarian, a claim that is open to political criticism. In this context, Eysenck carried out studies on Nazism and communist groups, claiming to find members of both groups to be more "dominant" and more "aggressive" than control groups.

Eysenck left Nazi Germany to live in Britain and was not shy in attacking Stalinism, citing the antisemitic prejudices of the Russian government, the luxurious lifestyles of the Soviet Union leadership and the Orwellian "doublethink" of East Germany's naming itself the German Democratic Republic despite being "one of the most undemocratic regimes in the world today". While Eysenck was an opponent of Nazism, his relationship with fascist organizations was more complex. Eysenck himself lent theoretical support to the English National Party, which also opposed Hitlerite Nazism, and was interviewed in the first issue of their journal The Beacon in relation to his controversial views on relative intelligence between different races. At one point during the interview, Eysenck was asked whether or not he was of Jewish origin before the interviewer proceeded. His political allegiances were called into question by other researchers, notably Steven Rose, who alleged that his scientific research was used for political purposes.

==== Subsequent criticism of Eysenck's research ====
Eysenck's conception of tough-mindedness has been criticized for a number of reasons.

- Virtually no values were found to load only on the tough/tender dimension.
- The interpretation of tough-mindedness as a manifestation of "authoritarian" versus tender-minded "democratic" values was incompatible with the Frankfurt School's single-axis model, which conceptualized authoritarianism as being a fundamental manifestation of conservatism and many researchers took issue with the idea of "left-wing authoritarianism".
- The theory which Eysenck developed to explain individual variation in the observed dimensions, relating tough-mindedness to extroversion and psychoticism, returned ambiguous research results.
- Eysenck's finding that Nazis and communists were more tough-minded than members of mainstream political movements was criticized on technical grounds by Milton Rokeach.
- Eysenck's method of analysis involves the finding of an abstract dimension (a factor) that explains the spread of a given set of data (in this case, scores on a political survey). This abstract dimension may or may not correspond to a real material phenomenon and obvious problems arise when it is applied to human psychology. The second factor in such an analysis (such as Eysenck's T-factor) is the second best explanation for the spread of the data, which is by definition drawn at right angles to the first factor. While the first factor, which describes the bulk of the variation in a set of data, is more likely to represent something objectively real, subsequent factors become more and more abstract. Thus one would expect to find a factor that roughly corresponds to "left" and "right", as this is the dominant framing for politics in our society, but the basis of Eysenck's "tough/tender-minded" thesis (the second, T-factor) may well represent nothing beyond an abstract mathematical construct. Such a construct would be expected to appear in factor analysis whether or not it corresponded to something real, thus rendering Eysenck's thesis unfalsifiable through factor analysis.

=== Milton Rokeach ===
Dissatisfied with Hans J. Eysenck's work, Milton Rokeach developed his own two-axis model of political values in 1973, basing this on the ideas of freedom and equality, which he described in his book, The Nature of Human Values.

Rokeach claimed that the defining difference between the left and right was that the left stressed the importance of equality more than the right. Despite his criticisms of Eysenck's tough–tender axis, Rokeach also postulated a basic similarity between communism and Nazism, claiming that these groups would not value freedom as greatly as more conventional social democrats, democratic socialists and capitalists would and he wrote that "the two value model presented here most resembles Eysenck's hypothesis".

To test this model, Rokeach and his colleagues used content analysis on works exemplifying Nazism (written by Adolf Hitler), communism (written by Vladimir Lenin), capitalism (by Barry Goldwater) and socialism (written by various authors). This method has been criticized for its reliance on the experimenter's familiarity with the content under analysis and its dependence on the researcher's particular political outlooks.

Multiple raters made frequency counts of sentences containing synonyms for a number of values identified by Rokeach—including freedom and equality—and Rokeach analyzed these results by comparing the relative frequency rankings of all the values for each of the four texts:

- Socialists (socialism) — freedom ranked 1st, equality ranked 2nd
- Hitler (Nazism) – freedom ranked 16th, equality ranked 17th
- Goldwater (capitalism) — freedom ranked 1st, equality ranked 16th
- Lenin (communism) — freedom ranked 17th, equality ranked 1st

Later studies using samples of American ideologues and American presidential inaugural addresses attempted to apply this model.

=== Later research ===
Another replication came from Ronald Inglehart's research into national opinions based on the World Values Survey, although Inglehart's research described the values of countries rather than individuals or groups of individuals within nations. Inglehart's two-factor solution took the form of Ferguson's original religionism and humanitarianism dimensions; Inglehart labelled them "secularism–traditionalism", which covered issues of tradition and religion, like patriotism, abortion, euthanasia and the importance of obeying the law and authority figures, and "survivalism – self expression", which measured issues like everyday conduct and dress, acceptance of diversity (including foreigners) and innovation and attitudes towards people with specific controversial lifestyles such as homosexuality and vegetarianism, as well as willingness to engage in political activism. See for Inglehart's national chart.

Though not directly related to Eysenck's research, evidence suggests there may be as many as 6 dimensions of political opinions in the United States and 10 dimensions in the United Kingdom. This conclusion was based on two large datasets and uses a Bayesian approach rather than the traditional factor analysis method.

== Other double-axis models ==
=== Greenberg and Jonas: left–right, ideological rigidity ===
In a 2003 Psychological Bulletin paper, Jeff Greenberg and Eva Jonas posit a model comprising the standard left–right axis and an axis representing ideological rigidity. For Greenberg and Jonas, ideological rigidity has "much in common with the related concepts of dogmatism and authoritarianism" and is characterized by "believing in strong leaders and submission, preferring one's own in-group, ethnocentrism and nationalism, aggression against dissidents, and control with the help of police and military". Greenberg and Jonas posit that high ideological rigidity can be motivated by "particularly strong needs to reduce fear and uncertainty" and is a primary shared characteristic of "people who subscribe to any extreme government or ideology, whether it is right-wing or left-wing".

=== Inglehart: traditionalist–secular and self expressionist–survivalist ===
A recreation of the Inglehart–Welzel cultural map of the world based on the World Values Survey. More recent versions can be found on the WVS website.

In its 4 January 2003 issue, The Economist discussed a chart, proposed by Ronald Inglehart and supported by the World Values Survey (associated with the University of Michigan), to plot cultural ideology onto two dimensions. On the y-axis it covered issues of tradition and religion, like patriotism, abortion, euthanasia and the importance of obeying the law and authority figures. At the bottom of the chart is the traditionalist position on issues like these (with loyalty to country and family and respect for life considered important), while at the top is the secular position. The x-axis deals with self-expression, issues like everyday conduct and dress, acceptance of diversity (including foreigners) and innovation, and attitudes towards people with specific controversial lifestyles such as vegetarianism, as well as willingness to engage in political activism. At the right of the chart is the open self-expressionist position, while at the left is its opposite position, which Inglehart calls survivalist. This chart not only has the power to map the values of individuals, but also to compare the values of people in different countries. Placed on this chart, European Union countries in continental Europe come out on the top right, Anglophone countries on the middle right, Latin American countries on the bottom right, African, Middle Eastern and South Asian countries on the bottom left and ex-Communist countries on the top left.

=== Pournelle: liberty–control, irrationalism–rationalism ===
This very distinct two-axis model was created by Jerry Pournelle in 1963 for his doctoral dissertation in political science. The Pournelle chart has liberty on one axis, with those on the left seeking freedom from control or protections for social deviance and those on the right emphasizing state authority or protections for norm enforcement (farthest right being state worship, farthest left being the idea of a state as the "ultimate evil").The other axis is rationalism, defined here as the belief in planned social progress, with those higher up believing that there are problems with society that can be rationally solved and those lower down skeptical of such approaches.

=== Mitchell: Eight Ways to Run the Country ===
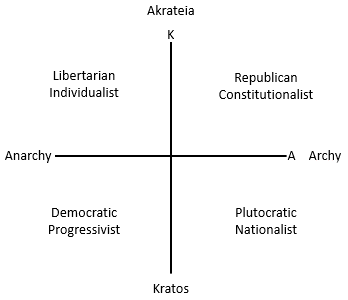
Mitchell's Eight Political Americans

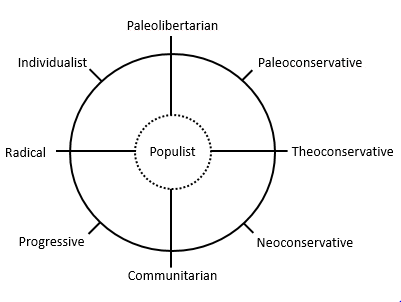
Mitchell's Eight Ways

In 2006, Brian Patrick Mitchell identified four main political traditions in Anglo-American history based on their regard for kratos (defined as the use of force) and archē or "archy" (defined as the recognition of rank). Mitchell grounded the distinction of archy and kratos in the West's historical experience of church and state, crediting the collapse of the Christian consensus on church and state with the appearance of four main divergent traditions in Western political thought:

- Republican constitutionalism = pro archy, anti kratos
- Libertarian individualism = anti archy, anti kratos
- Democratic progressivism = anti archy, pro kratos
- Plutocratic nationalism = pro archy, pro kratos

Mitchell charts these traditions graphically using a vertical axis as a scale of kratos/akrateia and a horizontal axis as a scale of archy/anarchy. He places democratic progressivism in the lower left, plutocratic nationalism in the lower right, republican constitutionalism in the upper right, and libertarian individualism in the upper left. The political left is therefore distinguished by its rejection of archy, while the political right is distinguished by its acceptance of archy. For Mitchell, anarchy is not the absence of government but the rejection of rank. Thus there can be both anti-government anarchists (Mitchell's "libertarian individualists") and pro-government anarchists (Mitchell's "democratic progressives", who favor the use of government force against social hierarchies such as patriarchy). Mitchell also distinguishes between left-wing anarchists and right-wing anarchists, whom Mitchell renames "akratists" for their opposition to the government's use of force.

From the four main political traditions, Mitchell identifies eight distinct political perspectives diverging from a populist center. Four of these perspectives (Progressive, Individualist, Paleoconservative, and Neoconservative) fit squarely within the four traditions; four others (Paleolibertarian, Theoconservative, Communitarian, and Radical) fit between the traditions, being defined by their singular focus on rank or force.

=== Nolan: economic freedom, personal freedom ===
Nolan Chart

The Nolan Chart was created by libertarian David Nolan. This chart shows what he considers as "economic freedom" (issues like taxation, free trade and free enterprise) on the horizontal axis and what he considers as "personal freedom" (issues like drug legalization, abortion and the draft) on the vertical axis. This puts left-wingers in the left quadrant, libertarians in the top, centrists in the middle, right-wingers in the right and what Nolan originally named populists in the bottom. Several popular online tests, where individuals can self-identify their political values, utilize the same two axes as the Nolan Chart, including The Political Compass.

== Three Telos Model ==
The "Three Telos Model", also known as the "Political Trichotomy" or "Ideological Triangle" is an explanatory framework that classifies political ideologies based on three fundamental and competing end goals, or teloi: Freedom (Liberty and Autonomy), Equality (Equity and Social Justice), and Tradition (Stability and Order). Unlike standard Cartesian models—such as the Nolan Chart or the Political Compass—this model is typically represented as a ternary plot or "Triangle Political Map." This visualization implies a zero-sum relationship between the three values, where increasing the focus on one telos necessitates a corresponding decrease in the others.

=== Origins ===
The intellectual foundations of the trichotomy trace back to the same historical context as the traditional left–right spectrum. In his Reflections on the Revolution in France (1790), Edmund Burke identified a three-way tension between the inherited liberties of the British tradition, monarchical absolutism, and radical egalitarianism. This tripartite division was further explored by Alexis de Tocqueville, who analyzed the tension between liberty and equality, and Lord Acton, who identified "three principal theories" challenging the established order: equality (anti-aristocratic), communism (leveling of property and condition), and nationality. Acton argued that when any one of these ends becomes absolute, it inevitably paves the way for tyranny.

The model was formally geometricized in the mid-20th century by Friedrich Hayek. In his 1960 essay "Why I Am Not a Conservative," Hayek argued that a linear spectrum was misleading. He proposed instead a triangular diagram where the corners were occupied by socialists, conservatives, and liberals (in the classical sense), each pulling society in a different direction.

=== Modern applications ===
In the 21st century, the trichotomy has been used to explain alignments that do not fit a binary. Arnold Kling's The Three Languages of Politics (2013) describes how political groups communicate using three distinct moral axes—liberty-coercion, oppressor-oppressed, and civilization-barbarism—which correspond to the three corners of the triangle. Similarly, R. J. Rummel's "Conflict Helix" identified three "pure" political types—Libertarian, Authoritarian, and Totalitarian—while Mary Douglas's Grid-Group Cultural Theory categorized social values into Individualist, Egalitarian, and Hierarchist prototypes, both of which map onto the triangular framework.

In 2022, Eric Kaufmann released an influential report "The Politics of the Culture Wars in Contemporary America" via the Manhattan Institute which advocated for this model. This was later expanded in his book "The Third Awokening".

== Spatial model ==
The spatial model of voting plots voters and candidates in a multi-dimensional space where each dimension represents a single political issue sub-component of an issue, (Note: If voter preferences have more than one peak along a dimension, it needs to be decomposed into multiple dimensions that each only have a single peak. "We can satisfy our assumption about the form of the loss function if we increase the dimensionality of the analysis — by decomposing one dimension into two or more") or candidate attribute. Voters are then modeled as having an "ideal point" in this space and voting for the nearest candidates to that point. The dimensions of this model can also be assigned to non-political properties of the candidates, such as perceived corruption, health, etc.

Most of the other spectra in this article can then be considered projections of this multi-dimensional space onto a smaller number of dimensions. For example, a study of German voters found that at least four dimensions were required to adequately represent all political parties. The voter and politician distributions along these dimensions can be asymmetric.

== Other proposed dimensions ==
Two-axis political compass chart with a horizontal socio-economic axis and a vertical socio-cultural axis and ideologically representative political colours, an example for a frequently used model of the political spectrum

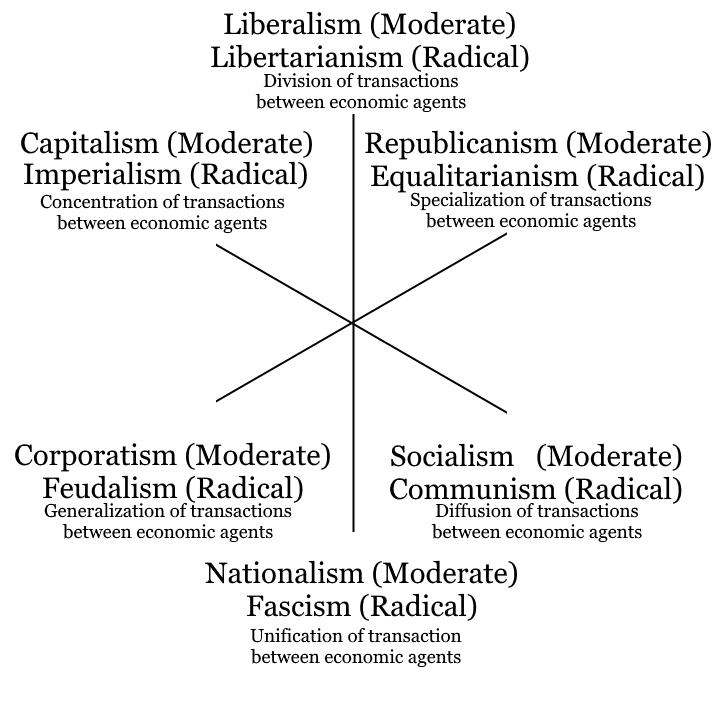
Three axis model of political ideologies with both moderate and radical versions and the goals of their policies

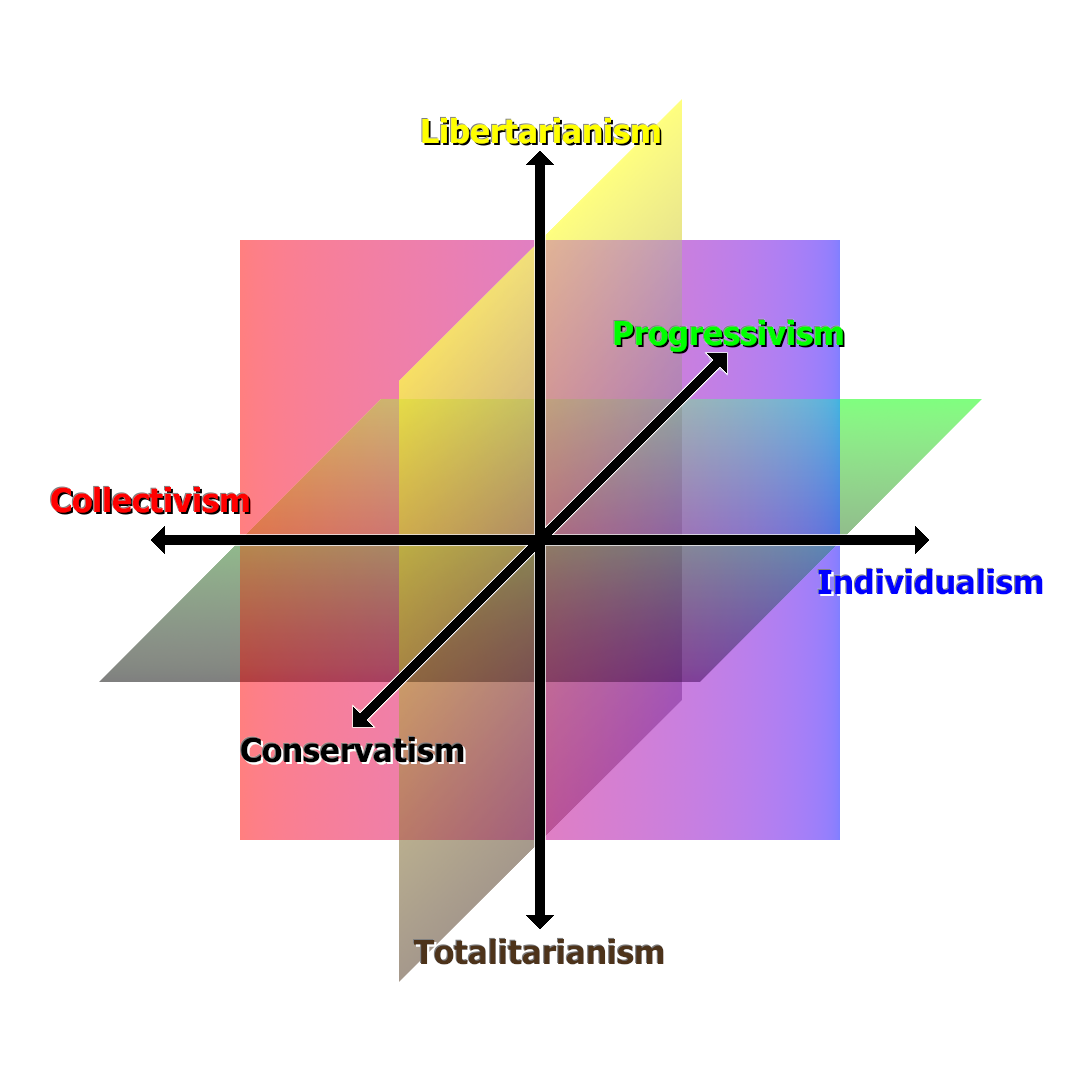
Another three dimensional model with the three main axes of political ideologies: Collectivism ⬌ Individualism; Progressivism ⬌ Conservatism; Totalitarianism ⬌ Libertarianism

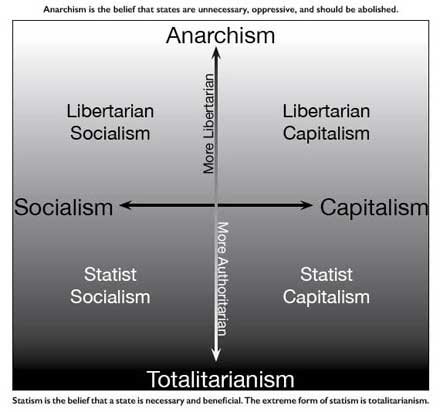
An economic group diagram based on The Political Compass

In 1998, political author Virginia Postrel, in her book The Future and Its Enemies, offered another single-axis spectrum that measures views of the future, contrasting stasists, who allegedly fear the future and wish to control it, and dynamists, who want the future to unfold naturally and without attempts to plan and control. The distinction corresponds to the utopian versus dystopian spectrum used in some theoretical assessments of liberalism, and the book's title is borrowed from the work of the anti-utopian classic-liberal theorist Karl Popper.

Other proposed axes include:

- Focus of political concern: communitarianism vs. individualism. These labels are preferred to the loaded language of "totalitarianism" (anti-freedom) vs. "libertarianism" (pro-freedom), because one can have a political focus on the community without being totalitarian and undemocratic. Council communism is a political philosophy that would be counted as communitarian on this axis, but is not totalitarian or undemocratic.
- Responses to conflict: according to the political philosopher Charles Blattberg, in his essay Political Philosophies and Political Ideologies, those who would respond to conflict with conversation should be considered as on the left, with negotiation as in the centre, and with force as on the right.
- Role of the religion: clericalism vs. anti-clericalism. This axis is less significant in the United States (where views of the role of religion tend to be subsumed into the general left–right axis) than in Europe (where clericalism versus anti-clericalism is much less correlated with the left–right spectrum).
- Urban vs. rural: this axis is significant today in the politics of Europe, Australia and Canada. The urban vs. rural axis was equally prominent in the United States' political past, but its importance is debatable at present. In the late 18th century and early 19th century in the United States, it would have been described as the conflict between Hamiltonian Federalists and Jeffersonian Republicans.
- Foreign policy: interventionism (the nation should exert power abroad to implement its policy) vs. non-interventionism (the nation should keep to its own affairs). Similarly, multilateralism (coordination of policies with other countries) vs. isolationism and unilateralism.
- Geopolitics: relations with individual states or groups of states may also be vital to party politics. During the Cold War, parties often had to choose a position on a scale between pro-American and pro-Soviet Union, although this could at times closely match a left–right spectrum. At other times in history relations with other powerful states has been important. In early Canadian history relations with Britain were a central theme, although this was not "foreign policy" but a debate over the proper place of Canada within the British Empire.
- International action: multilateralism (states should cooperate and compromise) versus unilateralism (states have a strong, even unconditional, right to make their own decisions).
- Political violence: pacifism (political views should not be imposed by violent force) vs. militancy (violence is a legitimate or necessary means of political expression). In North America, particularly in the United States, holders of these views are often referred to as "doves" and "hawks", respectively.
- Foreign trade: globalization (world economic markets should become integrated and interdependent) vs. autarky (the nation or polity should strive for economic independence). During the early history of the Commonwealth of Australia, this was the major political continuum. At that time it was called free trade vs. protectionism.
- Trade politics: free trade (businesses should be able trade across borders without regulations) vs. fair trade (international trade should be regulated on behalf of social justice).
- Diversity: multiculturalism (the nation should represent a diversity of cultural ideas) vs. assimilationism or nationalism (the nation should primarily represent, or forge, a majority culture).
- Participation: democracy (rule of majority or consensus) vs. aristocracy (rule by the enlightened, elitism) vs. tyranny (total degradation of aristocracy). Ancient Greek philosophers such as Plato and Aristotle recognized tyranny as a state in which the tyrant is ruled by utter passion, and not reason like the philosopher, resulting in the tyrant pursuing his own desires rather than the common good.
- Freedom: positive liberty (having rights which impose an obligation on others) vs. negative liberty (having rights which prohibit interference by others).
- Social power: totalitarianism vs. anarchism (control vs. no control) Analyzes the fundamental political interaction among people, and between individuals and their environment. Often posits the existence of a moderate system as existing between the two extremes.
- Change: radical revolutionaries (who believe in rapid change in support of an ideology) vs. progressives (who believe in advancing change to the status quo) vs. liberals (who passively accept change) vs. conservatives (who believe in moderating change to preserve the status quo) vs. radical reactionaries (who believe in changing things to a previous state, i.e. status quo ante).
  - Political moderates oppose radical (revolutionary or reactionary) policies, but they may have progressive, conservative, or liberal tendencies.
- Origin of state authority: popular sovereignty (the state as a creation of the people, with enumerated, delegated powers) vs. various forms of absolutism and organic state philosophy (the state as an original and essential authority) vs. the view held in anarcho-primitivism that "civilization originates in conquest abroad and repression at home".
- Levels of sovereignty: unitarism vs. federalism vs. separatism; or centralism vs. regionalism. Especially important in societies where strong regional or ethnic identities are political issues.
  - European integration (in Europe): Euroscepticism vs. European federalism; nation state vs. multinational state.
  - Globalization: nationalism or patriotism vs. cosmopolitanism or internationalism; sovereignty vs. global governance.
- Openness: closed (culturally conservative and protectionist) vs. open (socially liberal and globalist). Popularised as a concept by Tony Blair in 2007 and increasingly dominant in 21st century European and North American politics.
- Propertarianism: Support or opposition to "sticky" private property.
- Priority: the good of the state (patriotism) vs. the good of the population as a whole (utilitarianism) vs. the good of certain individuals (often occurs in autocratic regimes).
- Technology: technological progress or acceleration (e.g. transhumanism) vs. technological regress or deceleration (e.g. anarcho-primitivism).
  - FM-2030 coined the terms "up-wing" (looking to the sky and the future, e.g. space colonization) and "down-wing" (looking to the Earth and the past).

== Political spectrum–based forecasts ==
As shown by Russian political scientist Stepan S. Sulakshin, political spectra can be used as a forecasting tool. Sulakshin offered mathematical evidence that stable development (positive dynamics of the vast number of statistic indices) depends on the width of the political spectrum: if it is too narrow or too wide, stagnation or political disasters will result. Sulakshin also showed that in the short run the political spectrum determines the statistic indices dynamic and not vice versa.

== Biological variables ==
A number of studies have found that biology can be linked with political orientation. Many of the studies linking biology to politics remain controversial and unreplicated, although the overall body of evidence is growing.

Studies have found that subjects with conservative political views have larger amygdalae and are more prone to feeling disgust. Liberals have larger volume of grey matter in the anterior cingulate cortex and are better at detecting errors in recurring patterns. The anterior cingulate cortex is used when dealing with conflicting information. A study conducted by researchers from the University of California, Los Angeles (UCLA) and New York University (NYU) had participants sort through a deck of cards. The letter M was four times more likely to be in the deck than the letter W. Participants had to press a button every time an M came up in the deck. Liberals were shown to make fewer errors in mistaking the W for the M. This behavioral study supported the notion that liberals are better with dealing with conflicting information. Conservatives have a stronger sympathetic nervous system response to threatening images and are more likely to interpret ambiguous facial expressions as threatening. In general, conservatives are more likely to report larger social networks, more happiness and better self-esteem than liberals. Liberals are more likely to report greater emotional distress, relationship dissatisfaction and experiential hardship and are more open to experience and tolerate uncertainty and disorder better.

Genetic factors account for at least some of the variation of political views. From the perspective of evolutionary psychology, conflicts regarding redistribution of wealth may have been common in the ancestral environment and humans may have developed psychological mechanisms for judging their own chances of succeeding in such conflicts. These mechanisms affect political views.

== See also ==
- Political faction
- Cleavage (politics)
- Horseshoe theory
- Index of politics articles
- Left–right politics
- Median voter theorem
- NationStates
- Overton window
- The Political Compass
- Psephology
- Roemer model of political competition
