= Brittenden =

Brittenden is a surname. Notable people with the surname include:

- Arthur Brittenden (1924–2015), British newspaper editor
- Dick Brittenden (1919–2002), New Zealand cricket writer
- Pat Brittenden (born 1973), New Zealand broadcaster, blogger, and political commentator
- Wayne Brittenden, New Zealand journalist
