= 2006 Arizona's 8th congressional district election =

- November 7, 2006
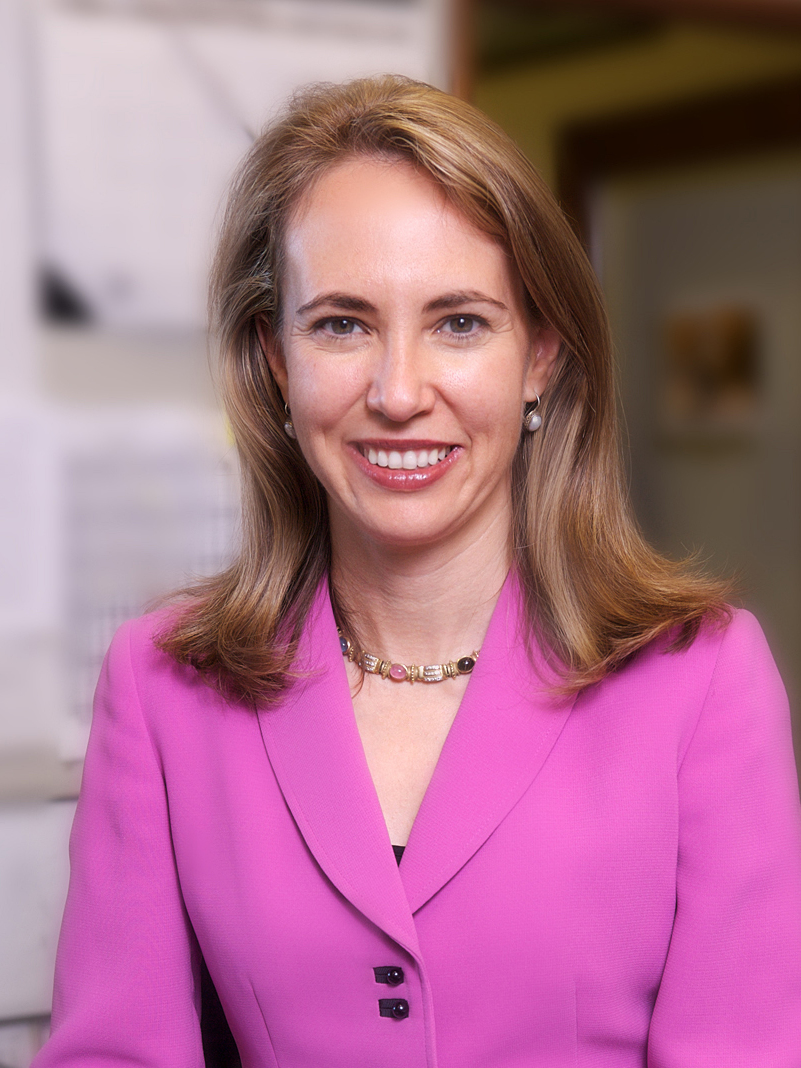

Nominee	Gabby Giffords	Randy Graf
Party	Democratic	Republican
Popular vote	137,655	106,790
Percentage	54.26%	42.09%
- County results Giffords: 40–50% 50–60% Graf: 50–60%
U.S. Representative before election
Jim Kolbe
Republican
Elected U.S. Representative
Gabby Giffords
Democratic

The 2006 Arizona 8th congressional district election was an election for the United States House of Representatives for the open seat of incumbent Republican Jim Kolbe, who was not running for re-election. The primary was held on September 12, 2006, and the two major party winners were Republican Randy Graf, a former state Representative who challenged Kolbe for the GOP nomination in 2004, and former State Senator Gabby Giffords. Libertarian Dave Nolan, who was uncontested in the primary, was also in the November 7, 2006, general election.

Graf was considered too conservative for the district. Kolbe withheld his endorsement, and towards the end of the election, the National GOP pulled their support. By election time, most non-partisan analyses considered this race the most likely district to switch hands, which it did, as Giffords won a decisive victory, 54% to 42%.

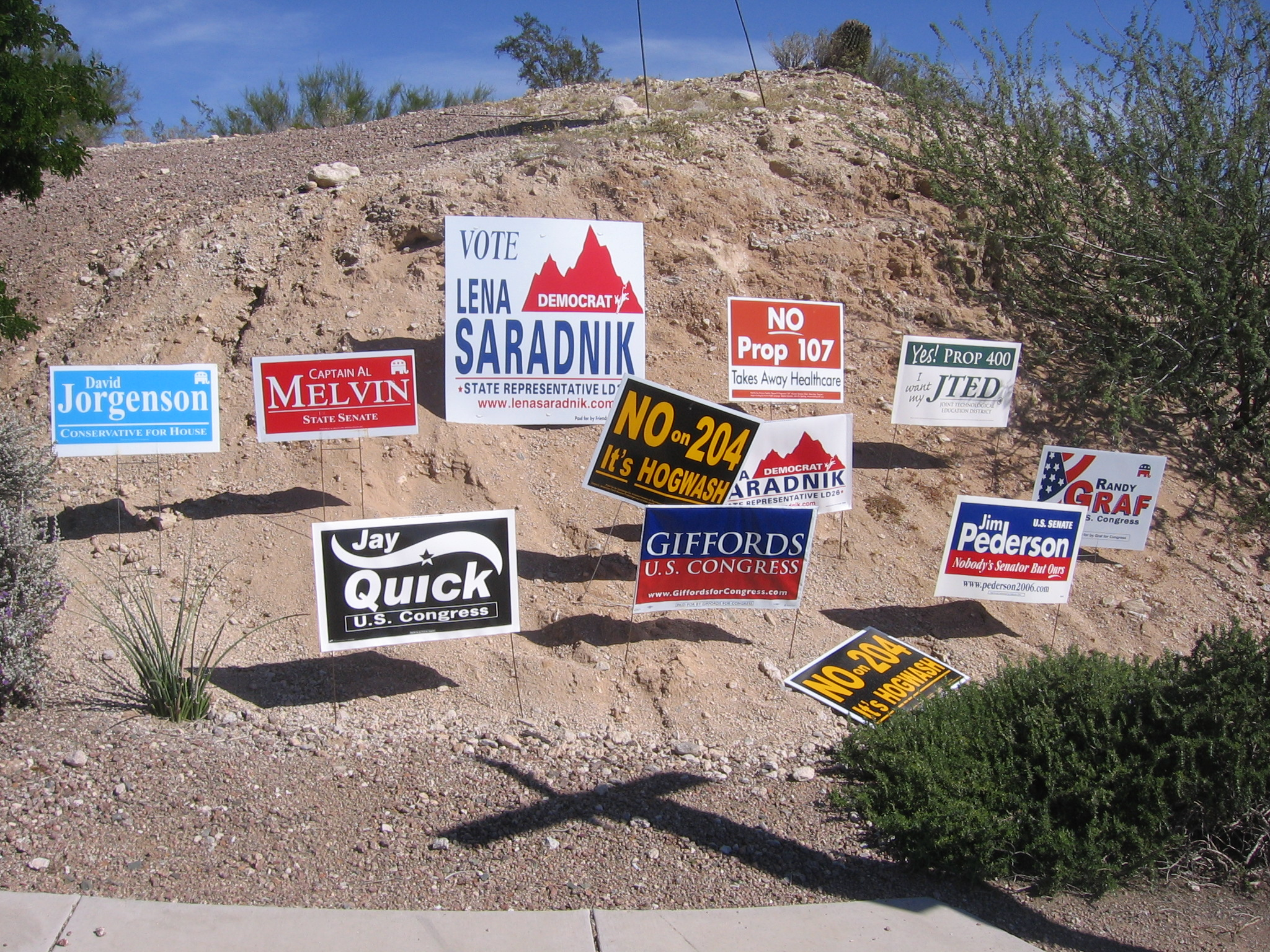
Campaign signs including for Graf, Giffords and Quick

== Primary ==
=== Candidates ===
- Frank Antenori (Republican), U.S. Army veteran
- Gabby Giffords (Democratic), former state senator
- Randy Graf (Republican), former state representative
- Mike Hellon (Republican), former chair of the Arizona Republican Party
- Steve Huffman (Republican), state representative
- Michael T. Jenkins (Republican), automobile repair shop owner
- William Daniel Johnson (Democratic), white nationalist activist
- Jeffrey Lynn Latas (Democratic), U.S. Air Force veteran
- David F. Nolan (Libertarian), co-founder of the Libertarian Party
- Patty Weiss (Democratic), television anchor
- Alex Rodriguez (Democratic), member of the Tucson Unified School District board
- Francine Shacter (Democratic), former Democratic precinct chairwoman

=== Republican campaign ===
Incumbent Republican Jim Kolbe announced on November 23, 2005, that he would not seek re-election in 2006. The district, located in Southeastern Arizona and based in the suburbs of Tucson, was Republican-leaning, but competitive: George W. Bush had won the district with 53% of the vote in 2004 (although only 50% in 2000). Kolbe had barely won the seat in 1984, but had usually skated to reelection since then. Even after coming out as gay in 1996, he remained very popular in the district, taking 61% of the vote in 2004. Although Kolbe was generally thought to be all but unbeatable in the district, it was widely believed that it would be very competitive once he retired.

Randy Graf, the primary winner, left a leadership position in the state House in 2004 to challenge Kolbe in the Republican primary. Graf had won 40 percent of the vote and had campaigned almost full-time since. A supporter of the Minuteman Project, Graf campaigned on a pledge to ensure that illegal immigrants had no path to citizenship and that the border would be further secured. Graf previously sponsored a bill (which did not pass) to allow patrons carry guns into bars and restaurants.

The GOP establishment, however, considered Graf as too conservative for a district that leaned Republican but gave President Bush only 53 percent of the votes in 2004, and tried to rally voters around moderate state representative Steve Huffman. However, another more moderate candidate, former Arizona Republican Party chairman Mike Hellon, also gained significant support, which split anti-Graf support and prevented Huffman from consolidating the moderate lane.

Huffman got a boost when the national GOP took the rare step of endorsing and supporting Huffman, putting $250,000 into the race. The other GOP candidates criticized the move as unfair. The national Democratic party spent nearly $200,000, much of it on advertisements critical of Huffman in an effort to help Graf's candidacy, believing Graf would be the weaker candidate in the general election.

Huffman's campaign was injured when, according to CQPolitics: "there were allegations that his (Huffman's) campaign treasurer, local real estate broker William Arnold, had stalked Hellon’s ex-wife, state Sen. Toni Hellon". Arnold quit as treasurer after Hellon obtained a restraining order against him, and Huffman's campaign said it had no involvement in Arnold's actions." The scandal expanded when it was revealed that unauthorised photos of Toni Hellon had been posted to a website owned by the same individual who had designed Huffman's campaign website. As a result of the incident, the Tucson Weekly withdrew its support for Huffman.

Steve Huffman (R)

Federal officials

- Jim Kolbe, incumbent U.S. Representative

Organizations

- U.S. Chamber of Commerce

Newspapers

- Tucson Weekly (endorsement rescinded)

=== Democratic campaign ===
Gabby Giffords, who was former State Senator, resigned from the Arizona Legislature just eight days after Kolbe's announcement, in order to run for his seat. She quickly established herself as the front-runner, largely on the basis of her legislative record. She also gained some beneficial publicity when it was revealed that she was engaged to space shuttle astronaut Mark Kelly. Her only serious competition was longtime KVOA television newscaster Patty Weiss, who ran as a more liberal alternative to Giffords.

=== Results ===
2006 Arizona's 8th congressional district open primary
Party	Candidate	Votes	%
Democratic	Gabby Giffords	33,375	26.3
Republican	Randy Graf	27,063	21.3
Republican	Steve Huffman	24,119	19.0
Democratic	Patty Weiss	19,148	15.1
Republican	Mike Hellon	9,095	7.2
Democratic	Jeffrey Lynn Latas	3,687	2.9
Democratic	Alex Rodriguez	2,855	2.2
Republican	Frank Antenori	2,724	2.1
Republican	Michael T. Jenkins	2,075	1.6
Democratic	William Daniel Johnson	1,768	1.4
Democratic	Francine Shacter	576	0.4
Libertarian	David F. Nolan	516	0.4

== General election ==
=== Candidates ===
- Gabby Giffords (Democratic), former state senator
- Randy Graf (Republican), former state representative
- David F. Nolan (Libertarian), co-founder of the Libertarian Party
- Jay Quick (Independent), geologist and businessman
- Russ Dove (Write-in), militiaman and convicted felon
- Leo F. Kimminau (Write-in)
- Paul Price (Write-in)

=== Campaign ===
Graf's campaign got off to a rough start in mid-September when outgoing Republican incumbent Jim Kolbe withheld his endorsement, citing "profound and fundamental differences" between their views. The Arizona Republic wrote that a "victory by Graf would in effect repudiate much of Kolbe's work on what has come to be known as 'comprehensive' immigration reform. In contrast with 'enforcement only,' Kolbe’s plan would create a guest-worker program and an opportunity for undocumented residents to become citizens eventually."

In mid-August CQPolitics changed their rating of the race from "Leans Republican" to "No Clear Favorite".

By late September, Graf's position had continued to deteriorate. The Cook Political Report changed their rating from "Toss Up" to "Leans Democratic", and the national Republican Party cancelled about $1 million in advertising support. Two days later, in what was seen as a diminished level of national influence and interest in what had long been considered a competitive race, the national Democratic party also pulled their financial support.

=== Endorsements ===
Gabby Giffords (D)

Organizations

- Human Rights Campaign

Newspapers

- Arizona Range News
- Esquire
Randy Graf (R)

Executive officials

- Karl Rove, White House Deputy Chief of Staff

Federal officials

- Dennis Hastert, Speaker of the United States House of Representatives
- John McCain, United States Senator

State officials

- Steve Huffman, state representative
- David Duke, former Louisiana state representative; former Grand Wizard of the Ku Klux Klan (endorsement rejected)

Individuals

- Frank Antenori, U.S. Army veteran

Organizations

- Minutemen Project
- Republican National Congressional Committee

=== Debates ===
2006 Arizona's 8th congressional district general election debates
No.	Date & time	Host	Moderator	Link	Participants			
Key: P Participant A Absent N Non-invitee								
Key: P Participant A Absent N Non-invitee					Jay Quick	David F. Nolan	Gabby Giffords	Randy Graf
1	October 17, 2006	Access Tucson; Arizona Daily Star	Joe Birchall	Video	P	P	P	P

=== Polling ===
On September 20, 2006, Gabby Giffords' campaign released an internal poll that showed her leading Republican candidate Randy Graf by 19 percentage points. The poll showed Giffords with 54% of the vote and Graf with 35%. The poll was based on responses from 500 likely general election voters and had a +/-4% margin of error.

Results from a second poll conducted during the same time period confirmed a Giffords lead while suggesting a slightly tighter race. This independent poll, conducted by 1 to 1 Direct and Marketing Intelligence, showed Giffords with a 12-point lead (Giffords [48], Graf [36], +/-4% MoE).

On October 4, Zogby released a poll showing Giffords with a 45–37 percent lead.

Poll source	Date(s) administered	Sample size	Margin of error	Randy Graf (R)	Gabby Giffords (D)	Others	Undecided
Reuters/Zogby	October 24–29, 2006	500 (LV)	±4.5%	41%	53%	2%	4%
Wick Communications	October 25–28, 2006	400 (LV)	±?%	35%	50%	4%	11%
Zimmerman & Associates and Marketing Intelligence (Arizona Daily Star)/KVOA)	October 20–23, 2006	600 (LV)	±4.0%	38%	48%	4%	10%
Reuters/Zogby	September 25 – October 2, 2006	500 (LV)	±4.5%	37%	45%	2%	16%
Bennett, Petts & Normington (D)	September 19–21, 2006	400 (LV)	±?%	29%	54%	–	17%
Zimmerman & Associates and Marketing Intelligence (Arizona Daily Star)/KVOA)	September 16–19, 2006	600 (LV)	±4.0%	36%	48%	3%	13%
Greenberg Quinlan Rosner Research (D-Giffords)	September 9–13, 2006	500 (LV)	±4.0%	35%	54%	5%	6%
Zimmerman & Associates and Marketing Intelligence (Arizona Daily Star)	September 1–4, 2006	800 (LV)	±4.9%	36%	46%	–	19%

=== Predictions ===
Source	Ranking	As of
The Cook Political Report	Lean D (flip)	November 6, 2006
Rothenberg	Likely D (flip)	November 6, 2006
Sabato's Crystal Ball	Likely D (flip)	November 6, 2006
CQ Politics	Likely D (flip)	November 7, 2006

=== Results ===
Giffords was declared the winner 37 minutes after the polls closed. Graf conceded defeat at 10:08 P.M. EST.

2006 Arizona’s 8th congressional district election
Party	Candidate	Votes	%
Democratic	Gabby Giffords	137,655	54.25
Republican	Randy Graf	106,790	42.09
Libertarian	David F. Nolan	4,849	1.91
Independent	Jay Dudley Quick	4,408	1.74
Write-ins	Russ Dove	7	0.00
Write-ins	Leo F. Kimminau	7	0.00
Write-ins	Paul Price	5	0.00
Total votes		253,720	100.00
Democratic gain from Republican			

==== By county ====
County	Gabby Giffords Democratic		Randy Graf Republican		All others		Margin		Total
County	#	%	#	%	#	%	#	%	Total
Cochise	17,889	49.4%	16,807	46.4%	1,510	4.2%	1,082	3.0%	36,206
Pima (part)	116,043	55.3%	86,386	41.1%	9,373	3.6%	29,657	14.2%	210,002
Pinal (part)	2,449	46.2%	2,725	51.4%	124	2.4%	-276	-5.2%	5,298
Santa Cruz (part)	1,274	57.5%	872	39.4%	68	4.1%	402	18.1%	2,214
Totals	137,655	54.3%	106,790	42.1%	9,275	3.7%	30,865	12.2%	253,720
