= Wayne Brittenden =

New Zealand journalist

- Born: 1940s Gisborne, New Zealand
- Occupations: Journalist, Author, Historian, Documentary Filmmaker
- Years active: 1978–present
- Known for: The Political Compass; Celluloid Circus
- Website: www.politicalcompass.org

Wayne Marsden Brittenden is a New Zealand journalist, author, historian, and documentary filmmaker. He has worked as a political journalist for the BBC, a correspondent for Radio New Zealand, and a contributor to publications such as The New Zealand Herald and The Christian Science Monitor. Brittenden is the creator and owner of The Political Compass website and podcast, and has authored the book The Celluloid Circus: The Heyday of the New Zealand Picture Theatre (2008) and documentaries including Summerhill: The Oldest Children's Democracy in the World (2003).

== Early life ==
Wayne Marsden Brittenden was born in the 1940s to Cedric Hugh Brittenden and Eila Marsdon Brittenden (née Brown). At 19 years of age, his father began managing The Roxy Theatre on Princes Street, Dunedin in 1930. Cedric managed the TET Kings Theatre, a cinema in Stratford, in the early 1940s. Cedric enlisted in the New Zealand Expeditionary Force around 1942 and resided in Christchurch. Cedric continued to work as theatre manager for the Kerridge Odeon Corporation.

As a child, Wayne used his bike to ride around Gisborne after school, and would also change movie posters for theatres his father managed. Wayne used any discarded posters to make kites or cut into scrap paper. He later recalled an incident where an elderly woman, holding a biblical pamphlet, would discourage people from entering his father's theatre due to the religious belief that cinemas were the work of the devil.

During the day at the theatre, Brittenden strategically planned promotions to attract audiences, aiming to divert crowds from the competing Amalgamated Theatres' chain. During the day at the theatre, Brittenden strategically planned promotions to attract audiences, aiming to divert crowds from the competing Amalgamated Theatres' chain. On six evenings a week, in addition to hosting a charity screening on Sundays, he would preside over the foyer, dressed in a tuxedo, personally welcoming guests.

== Career in journalism ==
=== Pace News Limited ===
On 19 October 1982, Brittenden incorporated Pace News Limited and assumed the position of director. The company, a New Zealand limited entity headquartered in Saint Heliers, Auckland, is categorized under Internet publishing and broadcasting. As of 2023, the company remains incorporated.

=== Radio New Zealand ===
In 1978, he was a correspondent in Tokyo, Japan, and reported on the Japanese reaction to an alleged UFO sighting located in Kaikōura, New Zealand, dubbed the "Kaikōura film footage" and highlighted a local woman who claimed to communicate with UFOs.

In September 1985, he was situated in Copenhagen, where he boarded the USS Iowa to interview the commanding officer about the presence of nuclear weapons on the ship and its compliance with Denmark's prohibition on hosting nuclear-armed vessels.

Starting around December 2001, he wrote articles under "Counterpoint" for The Inquirer. Counterpoint transitioned to an audio podcast for RNZ's Sunday Morning series and lasted from 2008 to 2016 according to RNZ's search results.

=== British Broadcasting Corporation ===
He was a political journalist with the BBC, making at least one contribution to the Sunday Supplement series for The Westminster Hour in the year 2005. The article is titled "Whatever Happened To Anarchism?"

=== Other publications ===
Brittenden penned articles for the Dominion Sunday Times, New Zealand Listener, Heritage New Zealand, New Outlook, and The Dominion Post, and The Christian Science Monitor. He is referred as a movie theatre historian by New Zealand Ministry for Culture and Heritage.

=== Consultancy for Auckland Unitarian Church ===
In 2001, Brittenden was involved in the "Denominational Involvement Media Project" and the "Social Responsibility and Media Consultancy Project" for the Unitarian church. His work includes providing "valuable" perspectives from an outsider's viewpoint, influencing the launch style and content of projects like Counterpoint, and contributing to initiatives aimed at promoting Unitarian perspectives in the media.

Brittenden monitored media daily for the Unitarian church, identifying opportunities and creating guidelines to address misconceptions. He visited local congregations, advising on profile-raising, and collaborated with the Information Officer on public relations. The church attributed successful letters on gay rights and faith school opposition to his input. He also trained office holders in interviews. The 2001 report noted: ‘Wayne provided valuable public relations advice.’

In 2005, he remained as a Media Consultant on a retainer basis. The report speaks positively of the successes made by the media team.

== Film industry ==
=== Investigative team ===
Around December 2008, Britten left New Zealand for the United Kingdom to run an independent investigative documentary team in London's West End.

=== Zentropa project ===
In 2002, Zentropa Entertainments, a Denmark-based film studio, planned a major production about Scandinavian settlers in New Zealand during the 1870s. Brittenden was hired to write the feature film script in English, focusing on the story of settlers abandoned in the wilderness instead of receiving promised farmland. Zentropa envisions a significant production shot predominantly in New Zealand, featuring both local and Scandinavian actors. Brittenden asked for contributions of anecdotes, diaries, or records related to the settlements in Dannevirke and Norsewood for research.

=== Summerhill: The Oldest Children's Democracy in the World (2003) ===
The DVD video authored by Brittenden, provides a presentation of Summerhill School, which is claimed as the oldest children's democracy globally. Released in 2003, the documentary is conducted in English and has a duration of 21 minutes. The publisher is identified as Summerhill School, located in Leiston. The content delves into experimental methods in education and is associated with educator Alexander Sutherland Neill the founder of the school.

=== New Zealand Eksperimentet (2002) ===
On 10 September 2002, the premiere of the Danish documentary film "New Zealand Eksperimentet" took place. The film, produced by Hans Kragh-Jacobsen and researched by Brittenden, delivers a cautionary message to the Danish audience. It urges them to be wary of adopting neo-liberal policies akin to those implemented in New Zealand over the preceding 15 years. The 36-minute documentary, available on VHS, is authored in both Danish and English by Hans Kragh-Jacobsen. Published by Specialarbejderforbundet i Danmark/Jensen & Kompagni A/S in Copenhagen in 2002.

=== Anthropology 101: The Ultimate Lecture (2007) ===
The lecture, "Anthropology 101: The Ultimate Lecture," was released in 2007 and is available in the DVD video format. Set in the future on a distant planet, the presentation is conducted by an anthropology lecturer who observes Earth's inhabitants on the brink of self-destruction. The lecturer utilizes a diverse array of images, ranging from trivial to evocative, to craft a compelling and often disquieting narrative that portrays life on Earth. The production includes musical contributions by Brian Eno and narration by Mark Rylance. The content of the lecture was written by Brittenden, with Lee Herrick serving as the producer.

=== The Invisible Wall (1993) ===
Published in 1993, this documentary is available in VHS video format and intricately explores the intricacies of food politics, multinational corporations, Third World debt, and trade barriers. It highlights how these factors contribute to the ongoing issues of poverty and environmental degradation in less affluent nations. Co-authored by John Gaffney, Ole Alshov, and Brittenden, the film includes insights from prominent critics such as Noam Chomsky, Susan George, and Kenneth Galbraith, who express their reservations about institutions like GATT, The World Bank, and the International Monetary Fund. Distributed by Filmakers Library and Pace News, this approximately 54-minute video delves into global disparities in the post-Cold War era, emphasizing their potential to worsen inequalities between the rich and poor. Brittenden takes on the role of the presenter.

== The Political Compass ==
=== Background ===
According to Pamela O'Connell of the New York Times, Brittenden is responsible for The Political Compass website. The website first appeared on 20 December 2000, and is a copyright under Pace News Limited. As reported by marketer Neil Patel's website traffic checker, as of 4 February 2024, the total estimated traffic the website gets (considering the organic keywords) is 420,000+ visitors per month.

Brittenden collaborated with the organization "One World Action" in the development of the website, which is led by Glenys Kinnock, a prominent member of the Labour Party and the Party of European Socialists. The site was initially featured on the One World Action's web server.

According to information from the One World Action website, the creators of the compass acknowledged their indebtedness to individuals such as Wilhelm Reich and Theodor Adorno for their pioneering contributions to this field.

=== Content ===
Visitors can engage in a political test to determine their ideological stance, receiving a personalized certificate based on their results. The test prompts users to express agreement or disagreement with 61 propositions on social and political subjects, positioning them on a compass. The east–west axis signifies economic tendencies from left to right, while the north–south axis represents social tendencies ranging from authoritarian to libertarian.

The site provides analyses of global political topics, offering counterpoints and speculative content. A reading list is also present to understand various political ideologies.

Specific sections dedicated to countries like New Zealand, Latin America, Italy, Australia, France, Canada, Germany, the United Kingdom, USA, and Ireland provide insights into political events and elections.

The site also connects to a Buzzsprout podcast titled "The Political Compass", hosted by Brittenden himself to discuss various political issues. Brittenden has invited guests such as Harry Vassallo, Jason Stanley, and Robert Dunham.

== Political views ==
Brittenden opposes capital punishment.

In a December 1986 article, "Porn Asunder," Brittenden advocated for a New Zealand perspective on pornography similar to Denmark's, where it is legal and widely accepted.

In July 2014, in his Counterpoint podcast, Brittenden criticized Israel's actions during the 2014 Gaza War, noting negative media coverage and stating, "All too often it seems, the victims end imitating the stereotype of their own oppression."

Brittenden opposes the CIA's enhanced interrogation techniques, describing them as "horrifying torture techniques on prisoners."

He supports the Occupy Movement in Hong Kong, describing it as an "unambiguous and genuine public campaign [for democracy]."

Brittenden criticizes aspects of the Five Eyes surveillance program, calling it an "Orwellian clock ticking." Further stated, It is only justified if its targeted, only deployed when necessary, never carried out without a court with records scrutinized by a public advocate. That individuals should be able to do whatever they want to public, as long it does not violate others privacy rights.

Brittenden has criticized Barack Obama, labeling his approach "Illiberal conservatism" due to his recruitment of former Clinton and Bush staff, as well as his associations with Wall Street bankers. Obama's Nobel Peace Prize is viewed as being primarily based on rhetoric. The critique extends to his handling of drone strikes, pursuit of whistleblowers, expansion of the surveillance state, and the perceived failure of Obamacare to establish a universal healthcare system. Additional criticisms include Obama's limited discussions on race and avoiding certain issues.

Brittenden remarked "Its about the freedom to own arms, not encountering a crazed gunman" regarding the political climate around guns in America. He paraphrased Justice Warren E. Burger's remark: "[The Second Amendment is] only to ensure state armies were maintained for defense, special interest groups have defraud the real intention."

Brittenden believes the atomic bombing of Hiroshima and Nagasaki was unjustified as it was a political decision rather than military.

He praised Thomas Paine as an "extraordinary Englishman" for advocating progressive ideals, including human rights, animal rights, women's rights, abolition of capital punishment, universal suffrage, pensions, minimum wage, and wealth distribution.

Brittenden described Donald Trump as a "bull in a china shop" in reference to his political persona.

Brittenden criticizes neoliberalism, particularly New Zealand's Rogernomics, and global neoliberal policies, referencing terms like "best value" and Margaret Thatcher's "There is no alternative" (TINA). He argues that these policies undermine universal healthcare, job security, and state pensions.

== Personal life ==
In his review for Scoop Review of Books, Chris Bourke depicts Brittenden's 2008 book Celluloid Circus as a well-informed and anecdotal work reflecting Brittenden's deep connection to the film industry. The review summarizes it as an enthusiastic effort to preserve memories from New Zealand's golden era of cinemas, resulting in a nostalgic endeavor.

Reverend Clay Nelson of the Auckland Unitarian Church claims to be a friend of Brittenden.

As of 2015, Brittenden currently spends his time between New Zealand and London.

In Copenhagen, Brittenden found a plaque marking Queen Margrethe II’s visit to Dannevirke, New Zealand, and felt it belonged there. He urged the Dannevirke District Council to acquire it. With contributions from the Scandinavian Society and locals, the council bought the plaque for $1200. In 1988, Brittenden delivered it to the Dannevirke Gallery of History, presenting it to manager Glen Innes.

== Bibliography ==
- The Celluloid Circus: The Heyday of the New Zealand Picture Theatre (2008) – Godwit Press in Auckland.
- Summerhill school (2003) – Pace News Ltd in Summerhill.
