= Left–right political spectrum =

System of classifying political positions

The left–right political spectrum is a system of classifying political positions, ideologies, and parties, with emphasis placed upon issues of social equality and social hierarchy. In general, left-wing politics support the sharing of political power, while right-wing politics are in favor of the concentration of political power. In addition to positions on the left and on the right, there are centrist and moderate positions, which are not strongly aligned with either end of the spectrum. It originated during the French Revolution based on the seating in the French National Assembly.

On this type of political spectrum, left-wing politics and right-wing politics are often presented as opposed, although a particular individual or group may take a left-wing stance on one matter and a right-wing stance on another; and some stances may overlap and be considered either left-wing or right-wing depending on the ideology. In France, where the terms originated, the left has been called "the party of movement" or liberal, and the right "the party of order" or conservative.

== History ==
=== Origins in the French Revolution ===
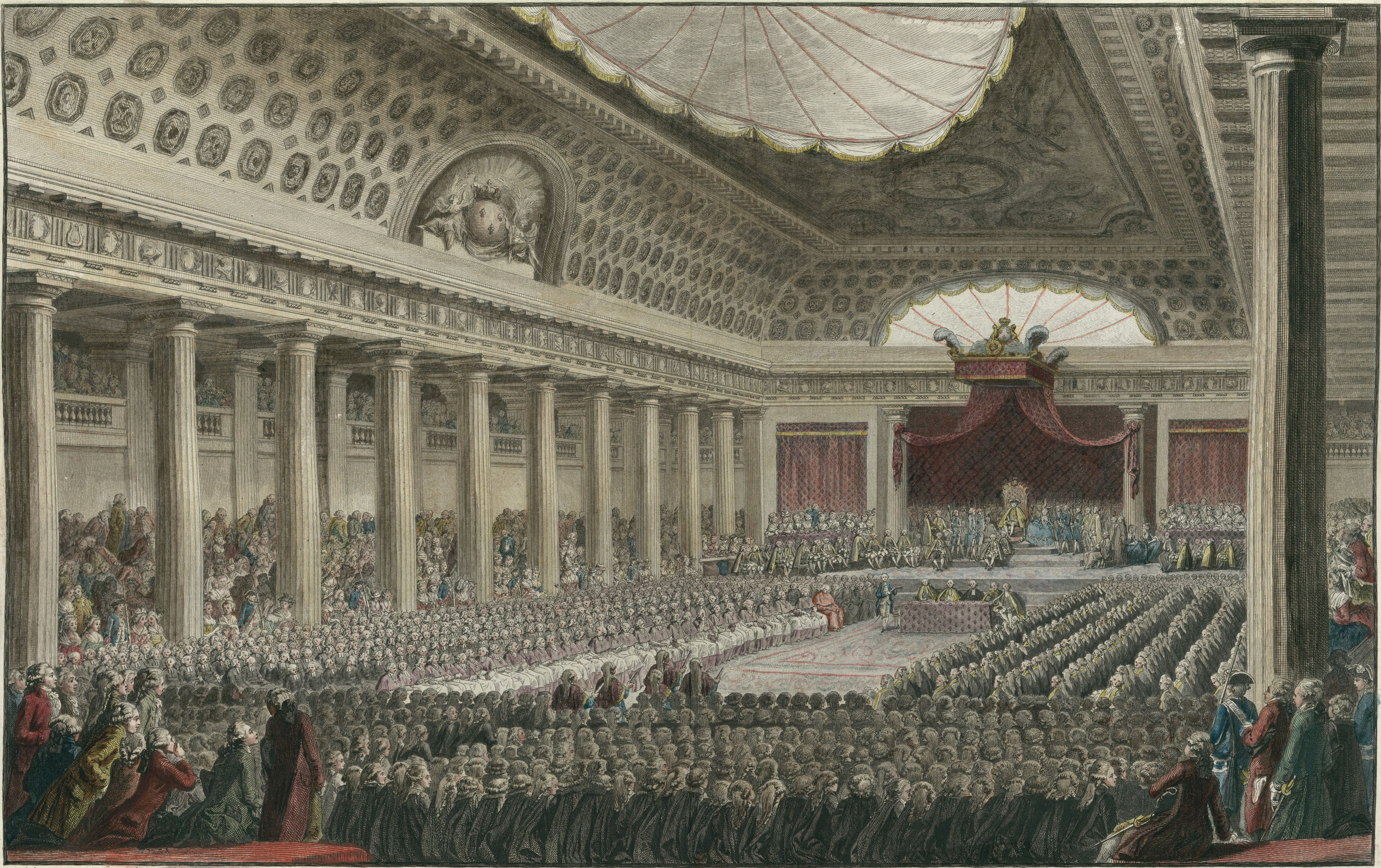
5 May 1789 opening of the Estates General of 1789 in Versailles

The terms "left" and "right" first appeared during the French Revolution of 1789 when members of the National Assembly divided into supporters of the Ancien Régime to the president's right side and supporters of the revolution to his left side. One deputy, the Baron de Gauville, explained: "We began to recognize each other: those who were loyal to religion and the king took up positions to the right of the chair so as to avoid the shouts, oaths, and indecencies that enjoyed free rein in the opposing camp".

When the National Assembly was replaced in 1791 by a Legislative Assembly composed of entirely new members, the divisions continued. "Innovators" sat on the left, "moderates" gathered in the centre, while the "conscientious defenders of the constitution" found themselves sitting on the right, where the defenders of the Ancien Régime had previously gathered. When the succeeding National Convention met in 1792, the seating arrangement continued, but following the coup d'état of 2 June 1793 and the arrest of the Girondins, the right side of the assembly was deserted and any remaining members who had sat there moved to the centre. Following the Thermidorian Reaction of 1794, the members of the far left were excluded and the method of seating was abolished. The new constitution included rules for the assembly that would "break up the party groups". Following the Restoration in 1814–1815, political clubs were again formed. The majority ultra-royalists chose to sit on the right. The "constitutionals" sat in the centre while independents sat on the left. The terms extreme right and extreme left, as well as centre-right and centre-left, came to be used to describe the nuances of ideology of different sections of the assembly.

Thomas Jefferson's Democratic-Republican Party supported the French Revolution in the 1790s when he opposed the Federalist Party that supported Britain. His friend Marquis de LaFayette had been a leader in France. Jefferson wrote LaFayette on November 4, 1823, where "Côté droit" means "right side" and "côté gauche" means "left side".:

for in truth the parties of Whig and Tory are those of nature. they exist in all countries, whether called by these names, or by those of Aristocrats and democrats, coté droite or coté gauche, Ultras or Radicals, Serviles or Liberals.

=== France after 1848 ===
After 1848, the main opposing camps were the "democratic socialists" and the "reactionaries" who used red and white flags to identify their party affiliation. With the establishment of the Third Republic in 1871, the terms were adopted by political parties: the Republican Left, the Centre Right and the Centre Left (1871), the Extreme Left (1876) and the Radical Left (1881). The beliefs of the group called the Radical Left were actually closer to the Centre Left than the beliefs of those called the Extreme Left.

=== 20th century usage ===
Beginning in the early twentieth century, the terms "left" and "right" came to be associated with specific political ideologies and were used to describe citizens' political beliefs, gradually replacing the terms "reds" and "the reaction". The words left and right were at first used by their opponents as slurs. Those on the Left often called themselves "republicans", which at the time meant favoring a republic over a monarchy, while those on the Right often called themselves "conservatives". By 1914, the Left half of the legislature in France was composed of Unified Socialists, Republican Socialists and Socialist Radicals, while the parties that were called "Right" now sat on the right side. The use of the words Left and Right spread from France to other countries and came to be applied to a large number of political parties worldwide, which often differed in their political beliefs.

There was asymmetry in the use of the terms Left and Right by the opposing sides. The Right mostly denied that the left–right spectrum was meaningful because they saw it as artificial and damaging to unity. However, the Left, seeking to change society, promoted the distinction. Émile Chartier said in 1931, "When people ask me if the division between parties of the Right and parties of the Left, men of the Right and men of the Left, still makes sense, the first thing that comes to mind is that the person asking the question is certainly not a man of the Left." In British politics, the terms "right" and "left" came into common use for the first time in the late 1930s in debates over the Spanish Civil War. Sociologist Robert M. MacIver said in The Web of Government (1947):

The right is always the party sector associated with the interests of the upper or dominant classes, the left the sector expressive of the lower economic or social classes, and the centre that of the middle classes. Historically this criterion seems acceptable. The conservative right has defended entrenched prerogatives, privileges and powers; the left has attacked them. The right has been more favorable to the aristocratic position, to the hierarchy of birth or of wealth; the left has fought for the equalization of advantage or of opportunity, for the claims of the less advantaged. Defence and attack have met, under democratic conditions, not in the name of class but in the name of principle; but the opposing principles have broadly corresponded to the interests of the different classes.

=== Ideological groupings ===
Generally, the left wing is characterized by an emphasis on "ideas such as freedom, equality, fraternity, rights, progress, reform and internationalism" while the right wing is characterized by an emphasis on "notions such as authority, hierarchy, order, duty, tradition, reaction and nationalism".

Political scientists and other analysts usually regard the left as including anarchists, (Note: Among whom there are many strains, such as anarcho-syndicalism, anarcho-communism, eco-anarchism, anarcho-primitivism, and individualist anarchism.) communists, socialists, democratic socialists, social democrats, left-libertarians, progressives, and social liberals. Movements for racial equality, as well as trade unionism, have also been associated with the left.

Political scientists and other analysts usually regard the right as including conservatives (among whom there are many strains, including traditionalist conservatism, libertarian conservatism, neoconservatism, and ultraconservatism); right-libertarians, anarcho-capitalists, monarchists, fascists, and reactionaries.

Various political ideologies, such as Christian democracy, some forms of liberalism, and radical centrism, can be classified as centrist.

A number of significant political movements do not fit precisely into the left–right spectrum, including Christian democracy, and regionalism. Though nationalism is generally regarded as a right-wing doctrine, some nationalists favor egalitarian distributions of resources. There are also civic nationalists, as well as left-wing nationalists. Populism is regarded as having both left-wing and right-wing manifestations in the form of left-wing populism and right-wing populism, respectively. Green politics is generally regarded as a movement of the left, although there are also green conservatives. Andrew Dobson suggests that green politics contains an inherent conservatism as it is "adverse to anything but the most timid engineering of the social and natural world by human beings".

=== Political parties ===
Seating in the 2024 European Parliament: The Left in the European Parliament (46) Progressive Alliance of Socialists and Democrats (136) Greens–European Free Alliance (53) Renew Europe (77) European People's Party Group (188) European Conservatives and Reformists Group (78) Patriots for Europe (84) Europe of Sovereign Nations (25) Non-Inscrits (32)

Political scientists have made models in which the ideologies of political parties are mapped along a single left–right axis. Klaus von Beyme categorized European parties into nine families, which described most parties. Beyme arranged seven of them from left to right: communist, socialist, green, liberal, Christian democratic, conservative and right-wing extremist. The position of agrarian and regional/ethnic parties varied. A study conducted in the late 1980s on two bases, positions on ownership of the means of production and positions on social issues, confirmed this arrangement.

There has been a tendency for party ideologies to persist and values and views that were present at a party's founding have survived. However, they have also adapted for pragmatic reasons, making them appear more similar. Seymour Martin Lipset and Stein Rokkan observed that modern party systems are the product of social conflicts played out in the last few centuries. They said that lines of cleavage had become "frozen".

The first modern political parties were liberals, organized by the middle class in the 19th century to protect them against the aristocracy. They were major political parties in that century, but declined in the twentieth century as first the working class came to support socialist parties and economic and social change eroded their middle class base. Conservative parties arose in opposition to liberals to defend aristocratic privilege, but to attract voters they became less doctrinaire than liberals. However, they were unsuccessful in most countries and generally have been able to achieve power only through cooperation with other parties.

Socialist parties were organized to achieve political rights for workers and were originally allied with liberals. However, they broke with the liberals when they sought worker control of the means of production. Christian democratic parties were organized by Catholics who saw liberalism as a threat to traditional values. Although established in the 19th century, they became a major political force following the Second World War. Communist parties emerged following a division within socialism first on support of the First World War and then support of the Bolshevik Revolution. Right-wing extremist parties are harder to define other than being more right-wing than other parties, but include fascists and some extreme conservative and nationalist parties. Green parties were the most recent of the major party groups to develop. They have mostly rejected socialism and are very liberal on social issues.

These categories can be applied to many parties outside of Europe. Ware (1996) asserted that in the United States both major parties were liberal, even though there are left–right policy differences between them.

== Contemporary terminology ==
=== Worldwide ===
The left-right political spectrum can change over time in a process that affects the views on politicians from more than one country. In most countries, classical liberalism is thought of as a right-wing ideology, but when classical liberal ideas made their debut, they were thought of as leftist.

"Left-wing" and "right-wing" in non-Western political contexts may vary significantly from their meaning in Western political contexts. China, for example, is governed by the Chinese Communist Party (CCP). Like communist parties traditionally do, the CCP deems itself as a progressive force on the left-wing. In this context, "left-wing" groups present themselves as supporters of the CCP and its political system, while those supporting liberal democracy are construed as "right-wing". Summarizing research in the Chinese political context, academic Chenyang Song writes that the left-wing/right-wing dichotomy is not an essential criterion for differentiating Chinese ideological stances.

=== Western Europe ===
In the 2001 book The Government and Politics of France, Andrew Knapp and Vincent Wright say that the main factor dividing the left and right wings in Western Europe is class. The left seeks social justice through redistributive social and economic policies, while the right defends private property and capitalism. The nature of the conflict depends on existing social and political cleavages and on the level of economic development.

Left-wing values include the belief in the power of human reason to achieve progress for the benefit of the human race, secularism, sovereignty exercised through the legislature and social justice and mistrust of strong personal political leadership. To the right, this is regularly seen as anti-clericalism, unrealistic social reform, doctrinaire socialism and class hatred.

The right wing believes in the established church both in itself and as an instrument of social cohesion, and they believe in the need for strong political leadership to minimize social and political divisions. To the left, this is seen as a selfish and reactionary opposition to social justice, a wish to impose doctrinaire religion on the population and a tendency to authoritarianism and repression.

The differences between left and right have altered over time. The initial cleavage at the time of the French Revolution was between supporters of absolute monarchy (the right) and those who wished to limit the king's authority (the left). During the 19th century, the cleavage was between monarchists and republicans. Following the establishment of the Third Republic in 1871, the cleavage was between supporters of a strong executive on the right and supporters of the primacy of the legislature on the left.

=== United States ===
A 2005 Harris Poll of American adults showed that the terms left wing and right wing were less familiar to Americans than the terms liberal or conservative. Peter Berkowitz writes that in the U.S., the term liberal "commonly denotes the left wing of the Democratic Party" and has become synonymous with the word progressive, a fact that is usefully contextualized for non-Americans by Ware's observation that at the turn of the 21st century, both mainstream political parties in the United States, generally speaking, were liberal in the classical sense of the word.

Michael Kazin writes that the left is traditionally defined as the social movement or movements "that are dedicated to a radically egalitarian transformation of society" and suggests that many in the left in the United States who met that definition called themselves by various other terms. Kazin writes that American leftists "married the ideal of social equality to the principle of personal freedom" and that contributed to the development of important features of modern American society, including "the advocacy of equal opportunity and equal treatment for women, ethnic and racial minorities, and homosexuals; the celebration of sexual pleasure unconnected to reproduction; a media and educational system sensitive to racial and gender oppression and which celebrates what we now call multiculturalism; and the popularity of novels and films with a strongly altruistic and anti-authoritarian point of view." A variety of distinct left-wing movements existed in American history, including labor movements, the Farmer-Labor movement, various democratic socialist and socialist movements, pacifist movements, and the New Left.

== Criticism ==
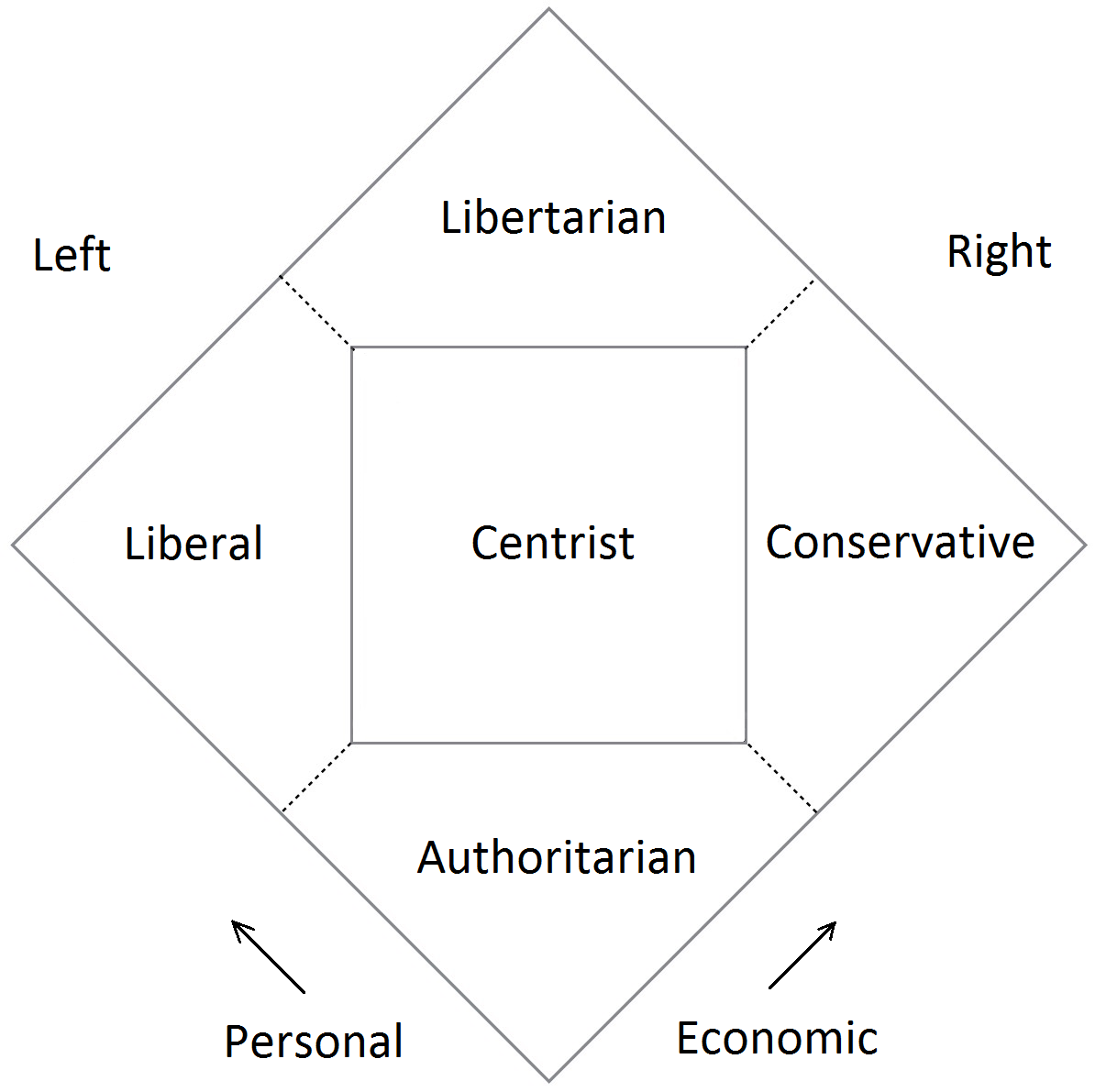
The Nolan chart in its traditional form

Political scientists have frequently argued that a single left–right axis is too simplistic and insufficient for describing the existing variation in political beliefs and include other axes to compensate for this problem.

American libertarian writer David Boaz argued that the political terms left and right are used to spin a particular point of view rather than as simple descriptors, with those on the left typically emphasizing their support for working people and accusing the right of supporting the interests of the upper class; and those on the right usually emphasizing their support for individualism and accusing the left of supporting collectivism. Boaz asserts that arguments about the way these terms should be used often displace arguments about policy by raising emotional prejudice against a preconceived notion of what the terms mean.

In 2006, British Prime Minister Tony Blair described the main cleavage in politics as not left versus right, but open versus closed. According to Blair, attitudes towards social issues and globalisation are more important than the conventional economic left–right issues. In this model, "open" voters tend to be culturally liberal, multicultural and in favour of globalisation while "closed" voters are culturally conservative, opposed to immigration and in favour of protectionism. The open–closed political spectrum has seen increased support following the rise of populist and centrist parties in the 2010s.

Norberto Bobbio saw the polarization of the Italian Chamber of Deputies in the 1990s as evidence that the linear left–right axis remained valid. Bobbio thought that the argument that the spectrum had disappeared occurred when either the left or right were weak. The dominant side would claim that its ideology was the only possible one, while the weaker side would minimize its differences. He saw the left and right not in absolute terms, but as relative concepts that would vary over time. In his view, the left–right axis could be applied to any time period.

A survey of Canadian legislative caucuses conducted between 1983 and 1994 by Bob Altemeyer showed an 82% correlation between party affiliation and score on a scale for right-wing authoritarianism when comparing right-wing and social democratic caucuses. There was a wide gap between the scores of the two groups, which was filled by liberal caucuses. His survey of American legislative caucuses showed scores by American Republicans and Democrats were similar to the Canadian right and liberals, with a 44% correlation between party affiliation and score.

While in many Western European democracies, traditionally the left is associated with socially liberal and economically left values, while the right is traditionally associated with socially conservative and economically right values, Eastern European, post-communist parties are frequently juxtaposed, with economically left parties holding nationalist positions more frequently and economically right parties being liberal and internationalist.

The Nolan Chart is a political spectrum diagram created by American libertarian activist David Nolan in 1969, charting political views along two axes, representing economic freedom and personal freedom. It expands political view analysis beyond the traditional one-dimensional left–right/progressive-conservative divide, positioning libertarianism outside the traditional spectrum.

== See also ==
- 1800 United States presidential election#Campaign
- Big tent
- NOMINATE, a quantitative method for displaying the ideological orientation of legislators (such as members of the US Congress) on a two-dimensional map based on their roll-call voting, with one of the two dimensions corresponding to the left-right spectrum
- Political spectrum

== Bibliography ==
- Bobbio, Norberto (1996). Left and Right: The Significance of a Political Distinction. Trans. and introduced by Allan Cameron. University of Chicago Press. ISBN 0-226-06245-7 – via Internet Archive.
- Evans, Geoffrey; Whitefield, Stephen (1998). "The Evolution of Left and Right in Post-Soviet Russia". Europe-Asia Studies. 50 (6): 1023–1042. doi:10.1080/09668139808412579. JSTOR 154054.
- Gauchet, Marcel (1997). "Right and Left". In Nora, Pierre; Kritzman, Lawrence D. (eds.). Realms of memory: conflicts and divisions. New York: Columbia University Press. ISBN 0-231-10634-3.
- Jou, Willy (2010). "The heuristic value of the left–right schema in East Asia". International Political Science Review. 31 (3): 366–394. doi:10.1177/0192512110370721. S2CID 145568847.
- Kazin, Michael (2011). American Dreamers: How the Left Changed a Nation (First Vintage Books ed.). Vintage Books.
- Knapp, Andrew; Wright, Vincent (2001). The government and politics of France. New York: Routledge. ISBN 0-415-21526-9.
- Lipset, Seymour Martin (1960). Political man: the social bases of politics. Garden City, NY: Doubleday.
- March, Luke (2012). Radical left parties in Europe. Routledge.
- Ostrowski, Marius S. (2022). Ideology. Polity. ISBN 9781509540723.
- Ostrowski, Marius S. (2023). "The ideological morphology of left–centre–right". Journal of Political Ideologies. 28 (1): 1–15. doi:10.1080/13569317.2022.2163770.
- Pech, Stanley Z. (1981). "Right, Left, and Centre in Eastern Europe 1860–1940: A Cross-National Profile". Canadian Journal of History. 16 (2): 237–262. doi:10.3138/cjh.16.2.237.
- Ruypers, John (2005). Canadian and world politics. Emond Montgomery Publications Limited. ISBN 1-55239-097-7.
- Ware, Alan (1996). Political Parties and Party Systems. Oxford: Oxford University Press. ISBN 0-19-878076-1.
- Zechmeister, Elizabeth (2006). "What's left and who's right? A Q-method study of individual and contextual influences on the meaning of ideological labels". Political Behavior. 28 (2): 151–173. doi:10.1007/s11109-006-9006-5. S2CID 144588319.
