= David Nolan (politician) =

Founder of the Libertarian Party of the US (1943–2010)

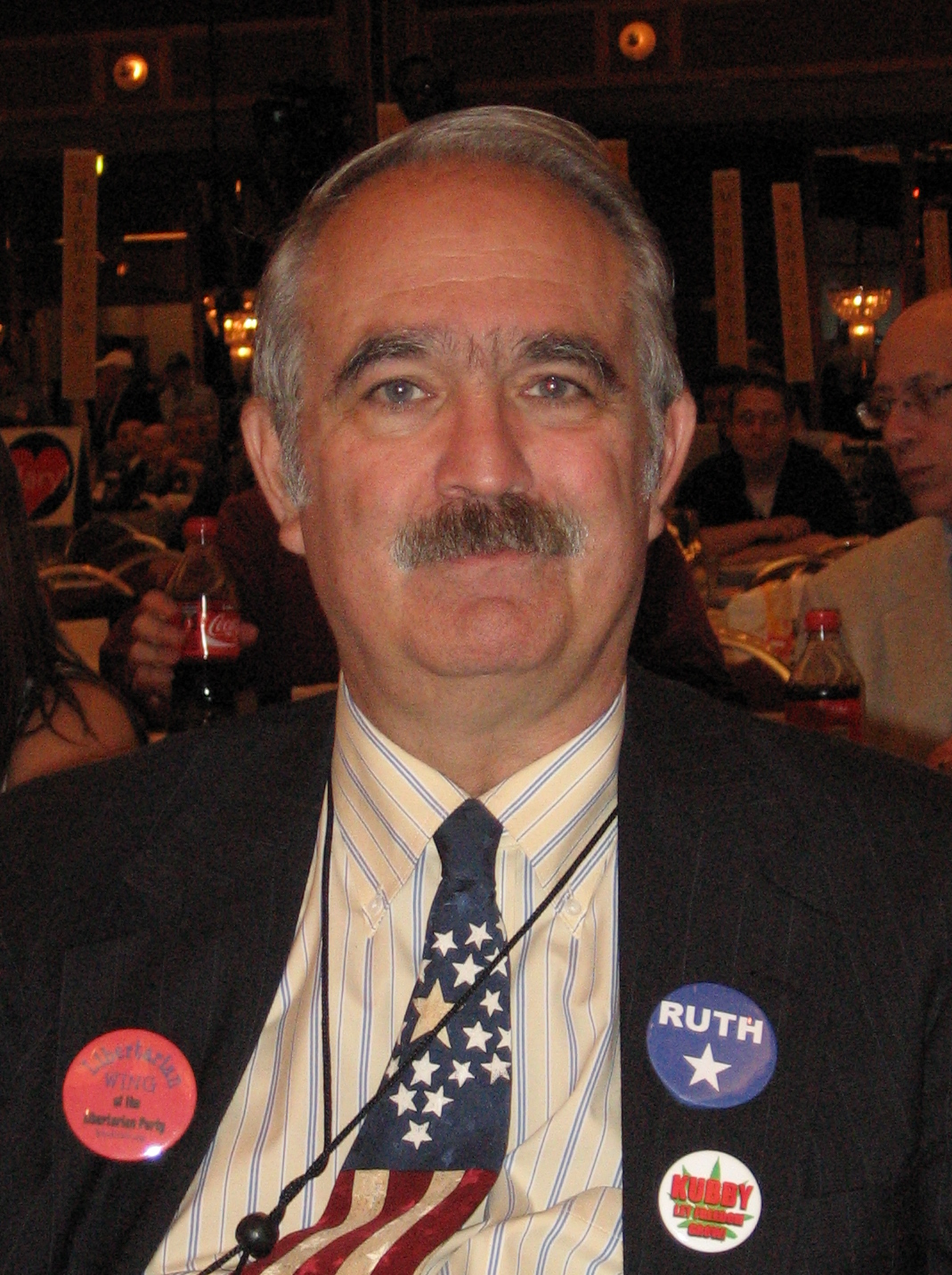
- Nolan at the 2008 Libertarian Party national convention

1st Chair of the Libertarian National Committee
- In office 1971–1972
- Succeeded by: Susan Nolan

Personal details
- Born: David Fraser Nolan; November 23, 1943 Washington, D.C., U.S.
- Died: November 21, 2010 (aged 66) Tucson, Arizona, U.S.
- Party: Libertarian (1971-2010)
- Other political affiliations: Republican (1961–1971)
- Education: Massachusetts Institute of Technology (BS)
- Occupation: Writer, politician
- Known for: Founding the Libertarian Party; Inventing the Nolan Chart

David Fraser Nolan (/ˈnoʊlən/; November 23, 1943 – November 21, 2010) was an American activist and politician. He was one of the founders of the Libertarian Party of the United States, having hosted the meeting in 1971 at which the Party was founded. Nolan subsequently served the party in a number of roles including National Committee Chair, editor of the party newsletter, Chair of the By-laws Committee, Chair of the Judicial Committee, and Chair of the Platform Committee.

David Fraser Nolan is also known as the inventor of the Nolan Chart, an attempt to improve on the left versus right political taxonomy by separating the issues of economic freedom and social freedom and presenting them on a two-dimensional plane instead of the traditional line. Decades after its introduction, it continues to be popular, with millions of copies having been distributed, including by the group Advocates for Self-Government as the "World's Smallest Political Quiz".

== Early life and education ==
Nolan was born on November 23, 1943, in Washington, D.C., and grew up in Maryland. During high school, he was influenced by Ayn Rand's objectivism and Robert A. Heinlein's libertarianism. He enrolled at Massachusetts Institute of Technology, graduating with a BS in political science in 1965. While at MIT, he helped in founding M.I.T. Students for Goldwater in 1964, promoting the Republican presidential candidacy of Senator Barry Goldwater.

== Career ==
While the traditional political "left-right" spectrum is a line, the Nolan Chart, created by David Nolan, is a plane, situating libertarianism in a wider gamut of political thought.

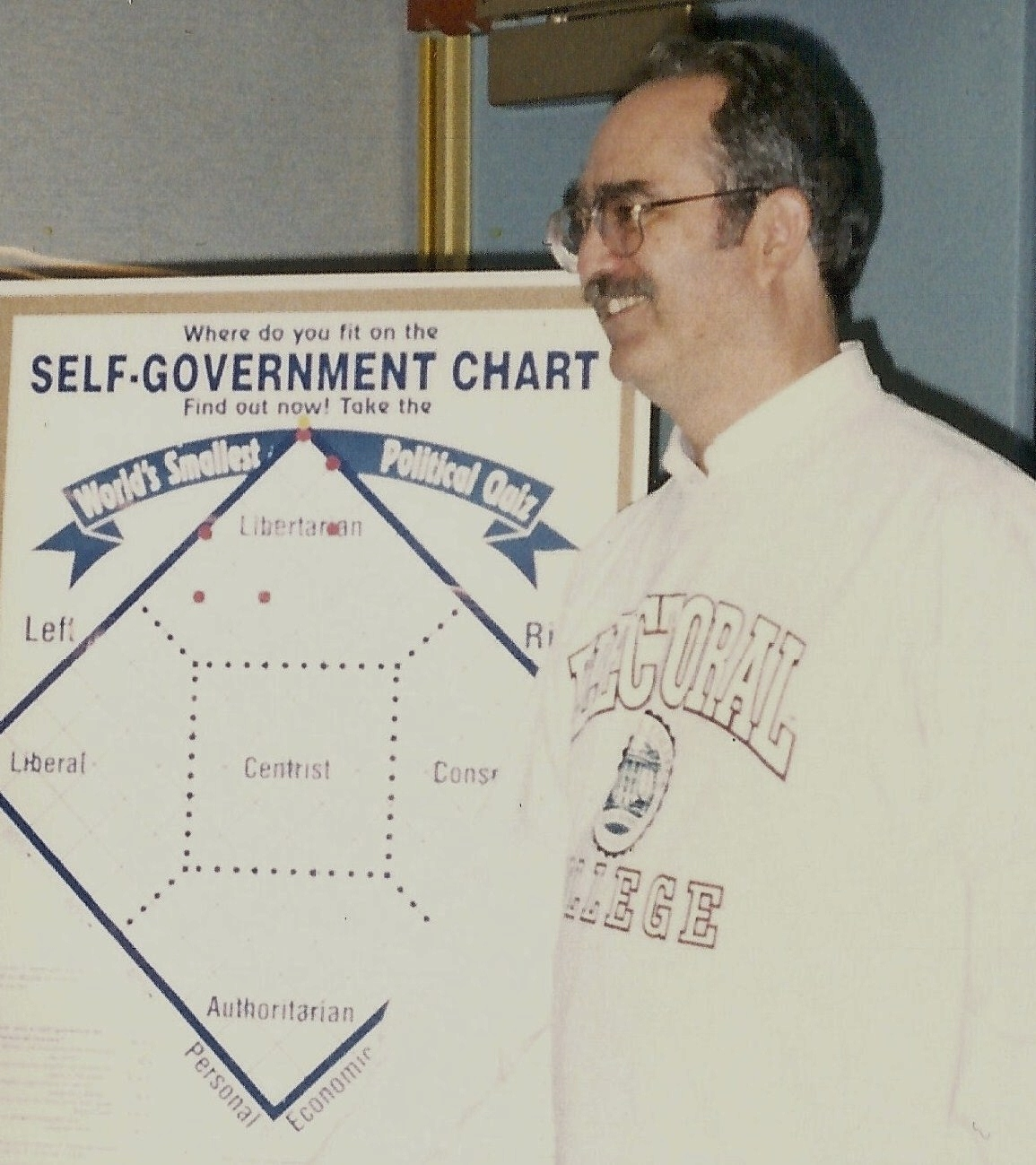
Nolan pictured with his eponymous chart at the 1996 Libertarian National Convention

Nolan was a member of Young Americans for Freedom in 1969 when more than 300 libertarians organized to take control of the organization from conservatives. Many walked out after a physical confrontation sparked by the burning of a draft card in protest to a conservative proposal against draft resistance. While sympathizing with the radicals, Nolan remained with the organization.

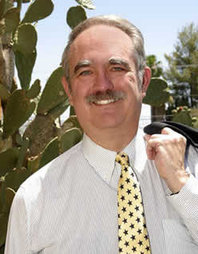
David Nolan during his 2010 Senate campaign

Nolan believed that in August 1971, President Richard Nixon's imposition of wage and price controls and closing the foreign gold window along with his belief that the Vietnam War was both ill-considered and illegal, were three of the final straws for Nolan and his group of initial founders of the Libertarian Party. Nolan and his group had initiated a Committee the previous July, Committee to Form a Libertarian Party, and joined forces with a previous demonstration Libertarian Party project and non-partisan political efforts of the now Liberty International. The group organized among a number of libertarians, including the International Society for Individual Liberty, which had been formed by dissident members of Young Americans for Freedom and European libertarians. They officially founded the Libertarian Party on December 11, 1971.

He ran unsuccessfully as a Libertarian for the United States House of Representatives in the 2006 Arizona's 8th congressional district election and received 1.9% of the vote. He also ran as the Libertarian candidate in the 2010 United States Senate election in Arizona, and received 63,000 votes, 4.7% of the total.

In the last few years of his life, especially after much of the Libertarian Party's platform was deleted in an organized "no confidence" effort by "reformers" in 2006, Nolan was sharply critical of the direction the party had taken, accusing party leaders of abandoning its radical roots and being "absorbed with minutia" and too focused on winning elections. "They're afraid to say anything that might scare people, because that might keep people from voting for them," he told Lew Rockwell in a December 2008 radio interview. "It's become a very timid organization in the last six or eight years."

In 2009, Nolan publicly endorsed the Free State Project, an attempt to move 20,000 Libertarians to New Hampshire to experience "Liberty in their Lifetimes".

Nolan died of a stroke in Tucson, Arizona, on November 21, 2010.

== See also ==
- Geolibertarianism
- Libertarianism in the United States
- Libertarian Party (United States)
- Political spectrum

Party political offices
Preceded by Position established	U.S. Libertarian Party Steering Committee Chair; 1971–1972	Succeeded by Susan Nolan
