= One World Action =

UK-based charity

One World Action, formerly Bernt Carlsson Trust, was a British development non-governmental organisation and registered charity based in London. It was founded by Glenys Kinnock in December 1989. The organisation supported development projects through partner organizations in Africa, Asia and Latin America.

== History ==
=== Founding ===
One World Action was established as the Bernt Carlsson Trust in memory of Bernt Carlsson, the United Nations Commissioner for Namibia who was killed in the bombing of Pan Am Flight 103 in 1988. The organisation initially planned to support the trade union movement in Namibia, with the intention of extending its aid to countries in Asia and Latin America.

The organisation was registered with the Charity Commission for England and Wales as a charitable company in 1993.

=== Activities ===
Its recorded activities included grant-making, advocacy, research and support for overseas partners, and it operated in countries including Angola, Bangladesh, India, Nicaragua, the Philippines, South Africa and Tanzania by 2011.

=== Closure ===
One World Action was removed from the register of charities on 2 October 2012 after it ceased operations.
