= Brian Patrick Mitchell =

American writer

Brian Patrick Mitchell (/ˈmɪtʃəl/) is an American writer, political theorist, and blogger, known for his theory of political difference, theology of interpersonal relations, and critical analysis of gender integration of the American armed forces.

== Early works ==
Mitchell was commissioned in the US Army through ROTC at the University of Cincinnati. After seven years in infantry and counterintelligence, he left the Army and became an associate editor of Navy Times, an independent weekly newspaper. In 1989, while at Navy Times, Mitchell published Weak Link: The Feminization of the American Military (ISBN 0895265559), the first book-length critical analysis of gender integration of the US military. The book received national and international attention, including appearances by Mitchell on ABC's Nightline, NBC's Today, CBS's Face the Nation, CNN's Larry King Live and Crossfire, and many other television and radio shows. In 1992, Mitchell testified before the Presidential Commission on the Assignment of Women in the Armed Forces.

In 1998, Mitchell published Women in the Military: Flirting with Disaster (ISBN 0895263769), which added coverage of events since the publication of Weak Link, including the Invasion of Panama, the Gulf War, the Tailhook scandal, and the Aberdeen scandal. The same year, Mitchell also published The Scandal of Gender: Early Christian Teaching on the Man and the Woman (ISBN 096491414X).

== Political theory ==
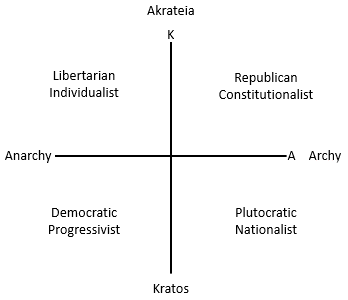
Mitchell's Eight Political Americans

In 2006, while working as the Washington bureau chief of Investor's Business Daily, Mitchell published Eight Ways to Run the Country: A New and Revealing Look at Left and Right (ISBN 0275993582), improving upon a theory of political difference first presented by Mitchell in the short-lived journal Theologies & Moral Concerns in 1995. Eight Ways analyzes modern American political perspectives according to their regard for kratos (defined as the use of force) and archē or "archy" (defined as the recognition of rank). Mitchell rooted his distinction of archy and kratos in the West's historical experience of church and state, crediting the collapse of the Christian consensus on church and state with the appearance of four main divergent traditions in Western political thought:

1. republican constitutionalism: pro archy, anti kratos
2. libertarian individualism: anti archy, anti kratos
3. democratic progressivism: anti archy, pro kratos
4. plutocratic nationalism: pro archy, pro kratos

Mitchell charts these traditions graphically using a vertical axis as a scale of kratos/akrateia and a horizontal axis as a scale of archy/anarchy. He places democratic progressivism in the lower left, plutocratic nationalism in the lower right, republican constitutionalism in the upper right, and libertarian individualism in the upper left. The political left is therefore distinguished by its rejection of archy, while the political right is distinguished by its acceptance of archy.

For Mitchell, anarchy is not the absence of government but the rejection of rank. Thus there can be both anti-government anarchists (Mitchell's "libertarian individualists") and pro-government anarchists (Mitchell's "democratic progressives," who favor the use of government force against social hierarchies such as patriarchy). Mitchell also distinguishes between left-wing anarchists and right-wing anarchists, whom Mitchell renames "akratists" for their opposition to the government's use of force.

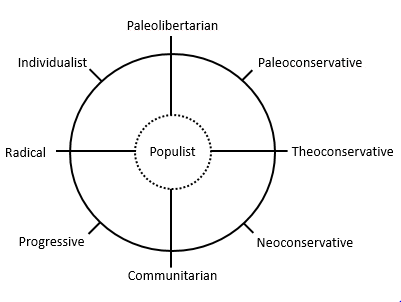
Mitchell's Eight Ways

In addition to the four main traditions, Mitchell identifies eight distinct political perspectives represented in contemporary American politics:

1. communitarian: ambivalent toward archy, pro kratos
2. progressive: anti archy, pro kratos (democratic progressivism)
3. radical: anti archy, ambivalent toward kratos
4. individualist: anti archy, anti kratos (libertarian individualism)
5. paleolibertarian: ambivalent toward archy, anti kratos
6. paleoconservative: pro archy, anti kratos (republican constitutionalism)
7. theoconservative: pro archy, ambivalent toward kratos
8. neoconservative: pro archy, pro kratos (plutocratic nationalism)

A potential ninth perspective, in the midst of the eight, is populism, which Mitchell says is vaguely defined and situation dependent, having no fixed character other than opposition to the prevailing power.

Eight Ways was largely ignored by the political mainstream but received favorable reviews from libertarians and paleoconservatives, who welcomed the attention and the critique. Anthony Gregory of the Independent Institute named Eight Ways "the best explanation of the political spectrum," saying it "makes sense of all the major mysteries."

== Theology ==
In 2010, Mitchell applied archē to Christian theology and anthropology, refining the concept to distinguish archy from hierarchy. Mitchell characterizes hierarchy as involving dissimilarity, inequality, subjection, and mediation between higher and lower ranks, whereas archy involves similarity, equality, unity, intimacy, and order based on derivative being or "sourceness."

Mitchell elaborated on this theme in his doctoral dissertation, published by Pickwick in 2021 as Origen's Revenge: The Greek and Hebrew Roots of Christian Thinking on Male and Female. Following Greek patristic theology, which identifies the Father as the archē of both the Son and the Holy Spirit, Mitchell terms relations within the Trinity archical and not hierarchical. He likewise terms relations within man as naturally archical but "economically" hierarchical on account of the fall. He explains male and female as reciprocal modes of relation and one aspect of the image of God in man. One mode is "archic" and consists of self-giving; the one mode is "eucharistic" and consists of thanksgiving. Both are modeled by the Father and the Son and by Christ and the Church.

== Personal ==
Mitchell has a PhD in theology from the University of Winchester, is a protodeacon of the Russian Orthodox Church Outside Russia, and serves at St. John the Baptist Russian Orthodox Cathedral in Washington, DC. In September 2012, Mitchell began a personal blog on "church, state, language, and life" at brianpatrickmitchell.com. He is also a member of the Academy of Philosophy and Letters.

== Bibliography ==
- Origen's Revenge: The Greek and Hebrew Roots of Christian Thinking on Male and Female (Pickwick, 2021)
- The Disappearing Deaconess: Why the Church Once Had Deaconesses and Then Stopped Having Them, (Eremia, 2021)
- A Crown of Life: A Novel of the Great Persecution (Pontic, 2014)
- Eight Ways to Run the Country (Praeger, 2006)
- The Scandal of Gender: Early Christian Teaching on the Man and the Woman (Regina Orthodox Press, 1998)
- Women in the Military: Flirting with Disaster (Regnery, 1998)
- Weak Link: Flirting with Disaster (Regnery, 1989)
