= Campaign advertising =

Use of an advertising campaign through the media to influence a political debate

One of the most controversial campaign adverts of the time, "Daisy", helped to swing the 1964 United States presidential election, in favor of Lyndon B. Johnson.

In politics, campaign advertising is propaganda through the media to influence a political debate and, ultimately, voting. Political consultants and political campaign staff design these ads. Many countries restrict the use of broadcast media to broadcast political messages. In the European Union, many countries do not permit paid-for TV or radio advertising for fear that wealthy groups will gain control of airtime, making fair play impossible and distorting the political debate.

In both the United Kingdom and Ireland, paid advertisements are forbidden, though political parties are allowed a small number of party political broadcasts in the run-up to election time. The United States has a very free market for broadcast political messaging. Canada allows paid-for political broadcasts but requires equitable access to the airwaves.

Campaigns can include several different media (depending on local law). The period during which political campaign advertising is permitted varies significantly from country to country, ranging from campaigns in the United States that last a year or more to places such as the UK and Ireland, where advertising is restricted by law to just a few weeks before the election. Social media has become very important in political messaging, making it possible to reach larger groups of constituents with minimal physical effort or expense. However, the overall messaging across these channels often needs to be managed by campaign managers.

== History ==
Political advertising has changed drastically over time.

=== United States ===
In his campaign for the 1948 United States presidential election, Harry S. Truman was proud of his accomplishment of shaking approximately 500,000 hands and covering 31,000 miles of ground across the nation. But that accomplishment was soon to pale in comparison when in 1952, the 1952 United States presidential election saw a major change in how candidates reached their potential audiences. With the advent of television, war hero and presidential candidate Dwight D. Eisenhower, created forty twenty-second television spot commercials entitled, "Eisenhower Answers America" where he answered questions from "ordinary" citizens in an attempt to appear accessible to "the common man". These questions were filmed in one day using visitors to Radio City Music Hall, who were filmed gazing up at Eisenhower as he answered questions about the Korean War, government corruption, and the state of the economy. He did not have to shake a half a million hands or travel the country extensively. He won the trust of the American people with his direct approach and subsequently the presidential election. His vice president was Richard M. Nixon.

In the 1960 United States presidential election, Vice President Nixon used a formal television address in his presidential campaign, designed to answer questions about The Cold War and government corruption, and to show Americans that he was the stronger, more experienced candidate. On the other side of the fence, Catholic born John F. Kennedy created approximately 200 commercials during his campaign, but there were two that made Nixon's efforts futile. The first was a thirty-minute commercial created from a speech he delivered in Houston, where he called for religious tolerance in response to criticism that Catholicism was incompatible with a run for the Oval Office. The second and more memorable was the first Kennedy-Nixon debate. In the first of four televised debates, Kennedy appeared tanned and confident in opposition to Nixon, who looked pale and uncomfortable in front of the camera. Seventy-five million viewers watched the debates, and although Nixon was initially thought to be the natural successor to Eisenhower, the election results proved otherwise, and Kennedy was ultimately declared the winner.

In the 1964 United States presidential election, aggressive advertising paved the way for a landslide victory for Lyndon B. Johnson. One of the first negative and maybe the most controversial commercial, perhaps of all time, was an advertisement dubbed "The Daisy Girl." The commercial showed a young girl picking the petals off a daisy. After she finishes counting, a voice off camera begins a countdown to a nuclear explosion. The ad ends with an appeal to vote Johnson, "because the stakes are too high for you to stay home." The commercial used fear and guilt, an effective advertising principle, to make people take action to protect the next generation. The ad ran for under a minute and only aired once, but due to the right wing, pro-war views of Barry Goldwater, the Republican candidate, it resulted in a 44 to 6 state victory for Lyndon B. Johnson.

Over the next decade, the United States saw the rise of the televised political attack ad. Richard M. Nixon was especially proficient at this form of advertising, and his commercials proved to be very successful in his reelection campaign during the 1972 United States presidential election, where he won handily with a 49 to 1 state victory. George McGovern ran a campaign free of political attack ads until the very end of his campaign, when he tried to attack Nixon after he realized he was dipping lower in the polls. His attempt proved to be too late, but his neutral style of attack ads against Nixon, featuring white text scrolling across a black background, became what is now seen as a fairly common method used in political and product advertising.

Attack ads continued to become the norm in political advertising. Ronald Reagan used them against Jimmy Carter during the 1980 United States presidential election. It was also the first time that a family member was also used to attack the opposing candidate. One particular advertisement showed Nancy Reagan (Reagan's wife) accusing Carter of a weak foreign policy. This campaign also saw the rise of campaign finance issues when Reagan used political action committees to solicit funds on his behalf. However, in Reagan's reelection bid during the 1984 United States presidential election, the United States experienced the beginning of a different form of political advertising; one with a much more positive flow and a stronger, more powerful message. With the country in a relatively prosperous state, advertisements in support of Reagan evoked an emotional bond between the country and its president. Visions of Americans going about their daily lives with relative ease were compiled to convince America that voting against Reagan was a vote against prosperity. The positive and emotionally provocative ads proved more successful than negative attack ads. He was so highly successful that he won against Walter Mondale with a 49 to 1 state victory.

In the 1988 United States presidential election, attack ads returned with a renewed vigor. George H. W. Bush used campaign ads that ridiculed his opponent Michael Dukakis, making him appear soft on crime. He contrasted these negative ads, with the emotional style commercial used by Ronald Reagan, to capitalize on his connection to the former president. Again borrowing from Reagan's campaign practices, he used free publicity as often as possible, making sure he was photographed in various situations that were likely to be aired in the evening news. Although Michael Dukakis tried to discredit the Bush campaign in many ways, he was ultimately unsuccessful, losing to the former vice president by thirty states.

== Regulation ==
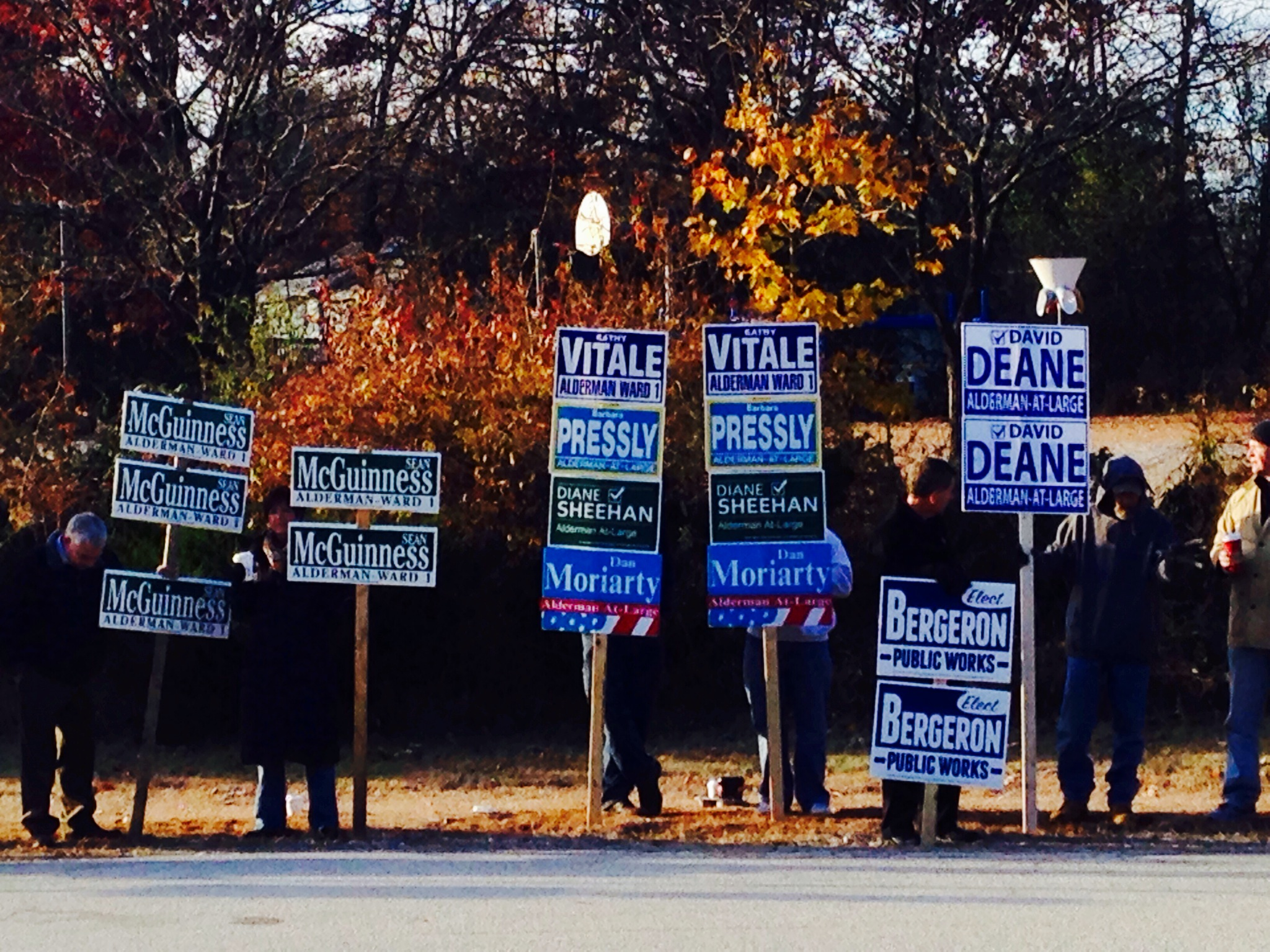
Candidate placards in New Hampshire, 2013

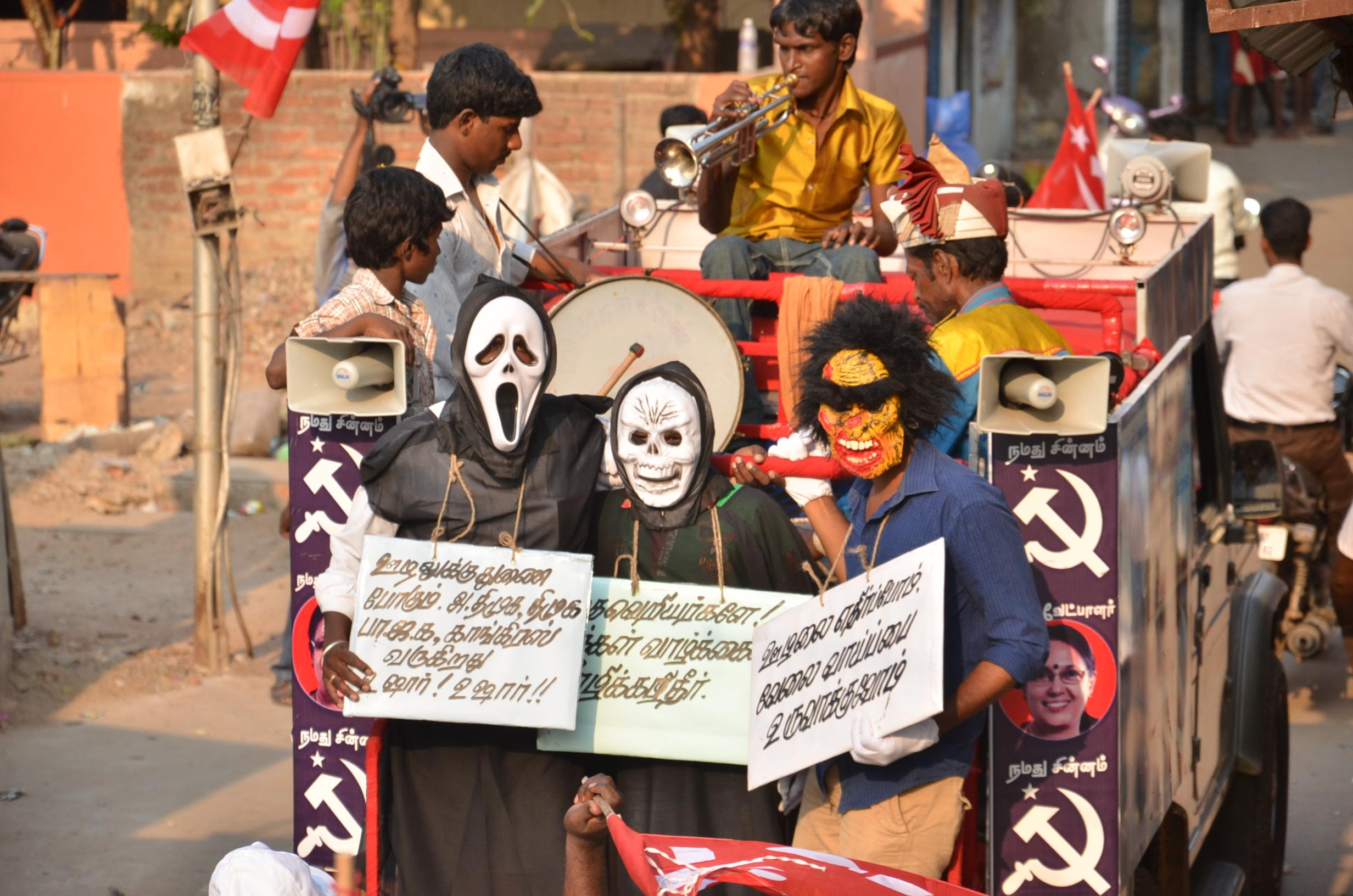
Political advertising truck in India, 2014

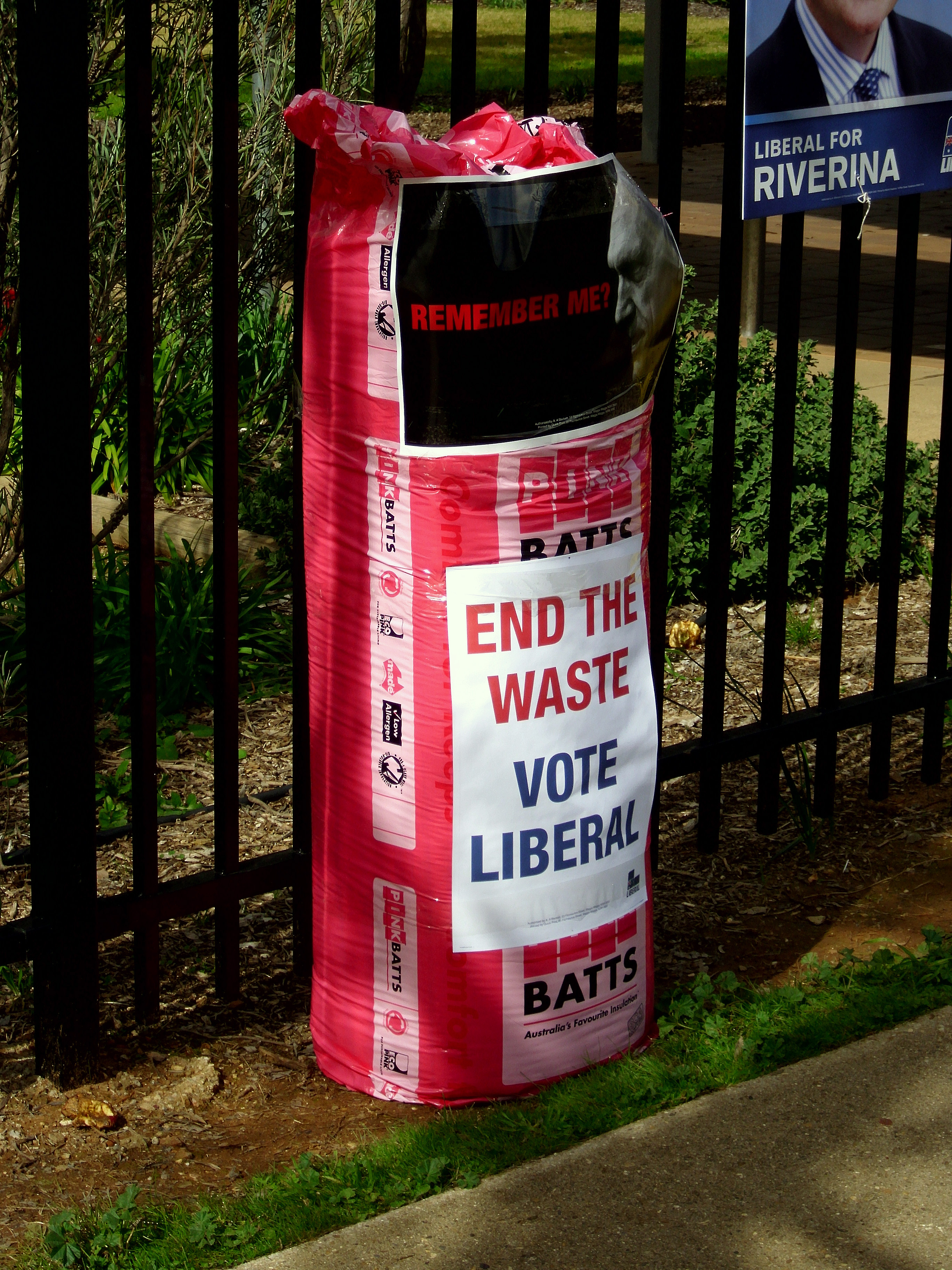
Advert for the Liberal Party of Australia, 2010

=== United States ===
While there have been some increases in regulation of campaign finance in the United States, there is generally little regulation of political advertising content. The Bipartisan Campaign Reform Act of 2002 addressed the issue of "soft money" or money contributed through political action committees, raised the legal limits of hard money that could be raised for any candidate, and set limits on what funds could be spent on election broadcasts, but it did not mandate verifiability in political campaign advertising. As of this time, there is no pending legislation addressing this issue.

Currently the Federal Communications Commission requires that the contracts for political ads shown on broadcast stations be posted online, but the agency is considering a proposal to expand that disclosure requirement to other platforms, including radio and cable.

A 2022 study found that candidate-centered campaign advertising became increasingly more prevalent in the United States around 1910. The study linked the increased frequency of candidate-centered advertising to the introduction of direct primaries and nonpartisan elections.

=== Costa Rica ===
Campaign advertising in Costa Rica is strictly regulated by the Electoral Code, which is overseen by the Supreme Electoral Tribunal (TSE). The TSE holds the status of the fourth branch of government in Costa Rica. The Electoral Code regulates a number of aspects of political advertising, such as the media. In this way, media outlets must be registered with the TSE in order to sell advertising space to political parties. Furthermore, any and all outlets must guarantee equal treatment and rates for all candidates participating in Costa Rican politics. The Electoral code also enacts what is known as a campaign blackout period. This period often runs from December 16 to January 1, banning any and all paid promotion in the news and media. A second blackout runs 3 days from the election day to after the day of election, ensuring that civilians are not influenced directly before the election day. The Costa Rican government also relies on Article 142 of the Electoral code, which bars the executive branch from using state resources and/or social media from promoting government projects once elections are called. This aims to prevent any advantage from distorting the democratic process during the election period. The Electoral Code also prohibits any political propaganda invoking religious motives or utilizing religious beliefs to push forward political agendas. The TSE threatens any violators of the Electoral code with financial penalties that can reach up to 23 million colonies.

=== European Union ===
In the past the member states of the EU have struggled with transparency and accountability. So in March 2024 in order to promote fair elections and debates the EU enforces firm rules around online and offline political advertising. These rules require ads to clearly identify their sponsor, disclose targeting methods, and that ads be in a publicly accessible repository.

In contrast to advertising in the print, radio and internet media, many member states of the European Union have consistently restricted advertising on broadcast media which are aimed at political ends, both party political advertising and political advocacy by non-partisan groups. These restrictions have been justified on the basis that the ban offers a level playing field in which money interests cannot gain an unfair advantage in the political discourse of a member state. The broadcast media has been singled out due to its historical reach and influence.

Outright bans on advertising engaged in political advocacy have been referred to the European Court of Human Rights, which has held that such restrictions may be a breach of Article 10 of the European Convention on Human Rights. But the Court has also held that restrictions on political advertising can be justified in certain circumstances, provided they were proportionate to the public interest they aimed to protect. Certain member states including the United Kingdom, Ireland and Switzerland have repeatedly refused to remove their blanket bans. An attempted television ad campaign by the Association against Industrial Animal Production (VGT) which drew a comparison between battery farming and the Holocaust was persistently refused in line with Swiss law, and was the subject of two ECtHR cases, the second case resulting from the persistent refusal by Switzerland to modify its laws on political advertising. However, in a similar UK case involving Animal Rights advertising, the Court upheld the UK ban on political advertising on several grounds. It held the UK had consulted widely before legislating, the court recognized the legitimacy of limiting political advertising on television, acknowledging the argument that there was a "risk of distortion" of public debate by wealthy groups having unequal access to advertising, and accepted that the ban was not a ban on free speech given that other methods of communication were available. The court thus recognized that television advertising is especially powerful and thus wealthy groups could block out the valid arguments of less wealthy groups and thus distort public debate. In Ireland for example, party political advertisements on broadcast media (known as Party Political Broadcasts) are restricted to specific circumstances such as political party conferences and a limited time period before a General Election. In the latter instance political parties are allowed specific time slots on the broadcast media in which the advert may be aired. These are limited in time, offered to all registered parties and must be aired at times during the schedules that have similar levels of viewership. Furthermore, a moratorium on all election coverage is mandated on the day of the ballot.

Some member states regulate the posting of election posters at both national and municipal level. In Ireland there are restrictions on the erection of election posters which mandate the time period after an election by which time the poster must be removed, with fines as a potential sanction. Some local councils have voted to ban the placement of election posters, citing the cost of removal and the waste generated.

Many municipalities in France restrict the placement of election posters to specific areas, often erecting stands specifically for that purpose. France has one of the most restricted advertisement campaigns in Europe. France passed a law in 2018 stating that the Superior Audiovisual Counsel in France has the ability to cancel or refuse to broadcast TV or radio shows if the information could be harmful to the French institutions or elections. This is mostly used to control the spread of misinformation. During election periods, larger platforms, like search engines or social media platforms, have certain rules and regulations they must follow. They must state information about who broadcast the political advertisements, like the company, who donated, and other personal information. When it is not during an election period, there are still regulations, like being transparent about their content, algorithms, and sponsors.

=== Turkey ===
Campaign advertisement for all elections is heavily regulated in Turkey through The 1961 Law on Basic Provisions on Elections and Voter Registers (Law on Basic Provisions). The Turkish Constitution reformed under coup d'état regime in 1982, contains a number of restrictions to fundamental civil and political rights directly affecting the conduct of elections. The Law on Presidential Elections (LPE), adopted in January 2012, (following the constitutional referendum in 2007 that changed the indirect presidential election system to a direct election of the president by popular vote with an absolute majority of valid votes) regulates aspects of the new presidential election system. It was adopted in an expedited manner with limited debate and no public consultation nor support of opposition parties. OSCE stated in their election report that LPE and Law on Basic Provisions are not harmonized and LPE lacks clarity.

Since 2022, the framework for regulation expanded to address both digital and social media communication. Law No. 7418, created in October 2022, introduced Article 217/A to the Turkish Penal Code, essentially criminalizing any form of public dissemination of misleading information with the potential for a prison sentence of up to 3 years. Critics of Article 217/A included the issue of potential selective targeting of oppositional messaging as well as independent and private journalism during election cycles. In 2025, further reforms amended Law No. 5651, also known as the internet law, enforces stricter transparency requirements on political ad targeting. The updates in question mandate that all social network providers are to disclose their recommendation engines as well as their personalization filters to the Information and Communication Technologies Authority (BTK). In addition to this, the Radio and Television Supreme Council (RTÜK) have also made efforts to intensify its oversight of broadcasting neutrality. During the 2024 Local elections, this same council issued fines to outlets for disproportionate coverage. Despite all of the control the Turkish government has placed on media to ensure an equal playing field for all political candidates, the Council of Europe had continued to call for a more cohesive framework for its laws. Furthermore, the Venice Commission had continually expressed concerns that many of the regulations overlap, creating a negative effect on public discourse. This points towards the potential for the undermining of the integrity of future democratic elections.

=== India ===
Campaigning is done through medias, newspapers and radios. By ruling of The Cable Television Network Rules of 1994, political advertisements were prohibited. However, a Supreme Court ruling in 2004 dictated that one may apply for an advertisement to be displayed on TV, but it must be approved by a committee created by the Chief Electoral Officer; the committee consists of The Joint Chief Electoral Officer, a Returning Officer, and one expert. Additionally, the committee will only consider advertisements from registered political parties or groups or organizations whose headquarter are in the National Capital Territory of Delhi. This model was also spread to other states; they are to have a committee consisting of a Joint Chief Electoral Officer, a Returning Officer, and one expert. Just as with Delhi, the other territories are to consider applications from registered political parties or groups or organizations whose headquarter are in the territory. In all cases, the Returning Officer is the one who considers applications for advertisements. Additionally, there is a committee within every state, designated by The Chief Electoral Officer, to handle and complaints. This committee consists of The Chief Electoral Officer, an observer, and an expert. In addition to these 2004 decisions, it was decided in 2007 that these procedures would be extended national parties for the elections in the states of Gujarat and Himachal Pradesh.

The parties are not permitted to take funds from corporate houses and the funds of the parties are non- taxable. The election commission which conducts the election sets out the rules and regulations for every election and enforces these rules as well. For example, all political parties have to stop campaigning forty eight hours before the election. Similarly, politicians facing criminal charges are often disqualified and communal content in speeches are also not permitted.

=== Japan ===
Japan distinguishes between party advertisements and candidate advertisements. There are few restrictions on political advertisements made by parties. One restriction is that party advertisements cannot mention specific candidates. Candidate advertisements have greater limitations and are paid for by the government. Candidates are not allowed to purchase their own advertisements. The number and type of candidate advertisements are also limited, including the size of newspaper advertisements, and length of television and radio advertisements. Japanese election law discourages negative campaign advertising directed at other candidates, parties, or political organizations. Campaign advertisements can only be broadcast during the two-week official campaign period and are closely monitored for violations of election law.

=== South Korea ===
In South Korea, political communications is governed in a strict manner by the Public Official Election Act (POEA), a regulatory system notable for its highly enforced nature. This act also states that all campaign activities are prohibited unless specifically authorized by The National Election Commission (NEC).This governmental body serves as the central body of the Korean Constitution with ministry-level status, while also overseeing rigorous enforcement of its laws. NEC also has the authority to request financial and communication records in order to investigate potential violations. Recently, a number of legislative updates have focused mainly on digital integrity and the threats that are posed by artificial intelligence. In December 2023, the POEA was amended in order to include Article 82–8, which places a total ban on the use of deepfakes generated by AI in election campaigns, which was an decision made within 90 days of an upcoming election. Any violators of the "deepfake prohibition" are prone to severe criminal penalties, including up to 7 years in prison. In early 2026, the government intensified its efforts to ban fake news through a multi-agency task force led by the Prime Minister, despite concerns from civil society groups such as Open Net Korea in regards to the "chilling effect" on political satire and anonymous forms of expression through social media and art.

=== Australia ===
Australia has five advertising campaign principles. First, campaigns should be relevant to government responsibilities. Secondly, campaign materials in advertising should be presented in an objective, fair and accessible manner and be designed to meet the objectives of the campaign. Facts presented should be accurate and verifiable. The third principle states that campaign materials should be objective and not directed at promoting party interests. Campaign materials must not mention the party in government by name, or directly attack or scorn the views, policies, or actions of others. Fourth, campaigns should be justified and undertaken in an efficient, effective and relevant manner. The last principle states that campaigns must comply with legal requirements and procurement policies and procedures. This is particularly important in respecting laws with broadcasting and media. When broadcasting political advertisements during an election period, the broadcaster must give all parties contesting the election a reasonable opportunity to have election matter broadcast during the election period. This does not need to be done for free. Sponsors or current affair programs must be identified during political advertising. While Australia does not exactly have a right to free speech, they have an implied freedom of political communication. There are regulations on the format and presentation of political advertising, but little regulation on the content.

Recent research has identified lies in advertising and text spamming as part of six key issues in the election campaign, suggesting reforms to protect Australia's democracy. Polling data revealed that 72% of voters encountered misleading political ads during the election campaign, while 42% saw them daily.

To this point, despite the fact that there is "implied freedom of political communication", the lack of regulation of content has led to significant public pressure for the inherent truth of political advertising and the laws that surround it. The Australian Consumer Law binds all commercial entities to a code that denies misleading or deceptive conduct; this does not currently apply to political promises or any claims made in political advertising campaigns. With South Australia's model of truth-in-advertising legislation solving this problem, many political advocacy groups across Australia propose that this model be applied nationwide. If this model were to be applied at a federal level, the Australian Electoral Commission (AEC) would have the authority to request or withdraw false material found in political campaign advertising.[citation needed]

The Australian government operates with five core advertising campaign principles. These principles primarily describe that campaigns must remain relevant to government responsibilities. They also must be presented in an objective, fair, and accessible manner. The facts presented must be accurate, verifiable, and proven by a secondary source. Furthermore, all facts should not be directed at promoting specific party interests, which includes the prohibition on mentioning the government party by name.

=== Singapore ===
In Singapore, political communication is often governed by the Parliamentary Elections Act of 1954 (PEA), with its 2024 Advertising Regulations that enforce "positive" regulation frameworks so that transparency and social coherence are paramount. All elections advertising, regardless of its nature, must include "published-by" requirements where the printer, publisher, and person in the ad are clearly identified. The Elections Department (ELD) monitors a mandatory "Cooling-off Day" strictly on the evening of polling, during which all campaigning and relating advertisements are completely prohibited in an effort to allow voters a period of reflection before election. To combat many modern digital threats, Singapore has enacted the Elections (Integrity of Online Advertising) (Amendment) Act in late 2024. This law specifically bans all usage of publication and sharing of deep fake material as well as digitally manipulated content that misrepresents a candidate's speech or actions during the election period.

=== Iran ===
Iran is made up of mainly Shiite Muslims and a small minority of Sunni Muslims. The history of censorship in Iranian political advertising and campaign tactics has followed the ebb and flow of the country's religiously conservative state, dating back to the birth of the Islamic regime during the Iranian Revolution of 1979. One of the most recent examples of this censorship dates back to 2007, when Iran's "fundamentalist-based parliament" passed legislation that severely restricted the content and presentation of political advertising. The restrictions limited candidates in the presidential election from displaying posters, especially with their own image on them, and greatly limited the use of other publicity tools in an effort to urge candidates to give their messages through government organizations. Critics suggest that this limitation of advertising venue and medium was an attempt by the state to keep standing politicians in office and limit the information available on new candidates. Outside reports from more recent elections and campaigns claim actions such as physical attacks on journalists and campaign heads by unknown parties and the modification of campaign websites and documentaries by state agencies.

=== Argentina ===
Argentina passed regulations on the allocation of television and radio campaigns in preparation for the 2013 primary and legislative elections. The regulation divides programming into 4 blocks throughout the day and allocates a certain percentage of time during the slots for campaign advertisement. For television during the blocks from 7–11am and from 4–8pm, 30% percent of the time will be allocated to campaign advertisement. For the slots from 11am–4pm and 8pm–1am, 20% percent of the time will be allocated for campaign advertisement. For radio the percentage of allocation during these 4 time blocks is flipped, 11am–4pm and 8pm–1am receiving 30% of the time for campaign advertisement, and 20% for the 7–11am and 4–8pm time blocks.

In Argentina, campaigns will use youth activism to change how they want to present the politics. They will use it to either promote collective politics or individual politics. They will alternate between the two depending on the current state of the political scene, public opinion, and the power of certain movements.

=== South Africa ===
Independent Communication Authority of South Africa (ICASA) established in 2000 is the regulatory body of broadcast political advertisements. It also serves to protect the message of the political advertisement from the broadcasting service. ICASA's regulations dictate the nature and acceptable content for aired political advertisements. Political party advertisements may only be authorized to be broadcast during the period of elections. A broadcasting service that airs a licensed ad must clearly state that this is in fact a political advertisement. The commercial cannot be longer than 1 minute in duration and cannot exceed 8 time slots within the designated period of elections. There is a required screening process of all political advertisements before being nationally aired. Failure to comply with these restrictions will result in maximum fine of one million Rand.

=== Russia ===
Russia, as well as many other countries, does not have a legal definition of "political advertising". Current Russian legislation regulates the form of political advertising such as election campaigns. This form involves activities to disseminate information about political forces and candidates to influence voting behaviour. Election campaign is defined as paid by a candidate, an electoral association, or other person acting in the interest of the candidate messages and materials, which encourage citizens to make the proposed action.

Political advertising in a broad sense is not regulated by a special law and follows the general rules governing freedom of speech, freedom of information, and freedom of association. Lack of legal definition of political advertising leads to the ambiguity of its understanding, which generates conflict situations in legal relations of advertising. Moreover, political advertising in Russia has evolved relatively recently, because from 1917 to 1991 there was only one political force in the country, which had no political opponents, and used ideological propaganda as the primary means of political communication.

=== Canada ===
According to the Canadian Radio-television and Telecommunications Commission, the key role of broadcasters is to inform potential voters on issues, political parties and candidates during an election period. This means ensuring equitable airtime for all candidates on each broadcast network. 6.5 hours of prime programing should be available for the purchase by all parties. On-air personalities running as a candidate in a provincial or federal election are required halt any on-air duties as soon as his or her candidacy is announced or the election is called. According to Elections Ontario, there are restrictions regarding when political advertising may be aired and restrictions on the rates broadcasters and publishing facilities can charge for said advertising.

=== Albania ===
In Albania, the Electoral Code of the Republic of Albania decides the rules and regulations for campaign advertisements. The electoral campaign period starts 30 days before the election and ends one day prior. There is a period of silence, which means that there can be no political campaigns between the day before the election and the hour of the election. Public television and radio programs broadcast for the different political parties, but have certain regulations to follow. Each party, as well at the Central Election Committee (CEC), gets a certain amount of broadcasting time. The CEC is allowed two hours of free airtime. The parliament party that has more than 20% of the seats gets at least 30 minutes on public television and at least 30 minutes on public radio. The parliament party that has less than 20% of the seats gets at least 15 minutes on public television and radio each. The parties that are not in the parliament get at least 10 minutes of time on the television and radio each. Private television and radio programs are only allowed to broadcast campaign advertisements for a total of 90 minutes for each party and are required to charge the same amount for each time slot. Also, government institutions are not allowed to broadcast advertisements.

== Effects ==
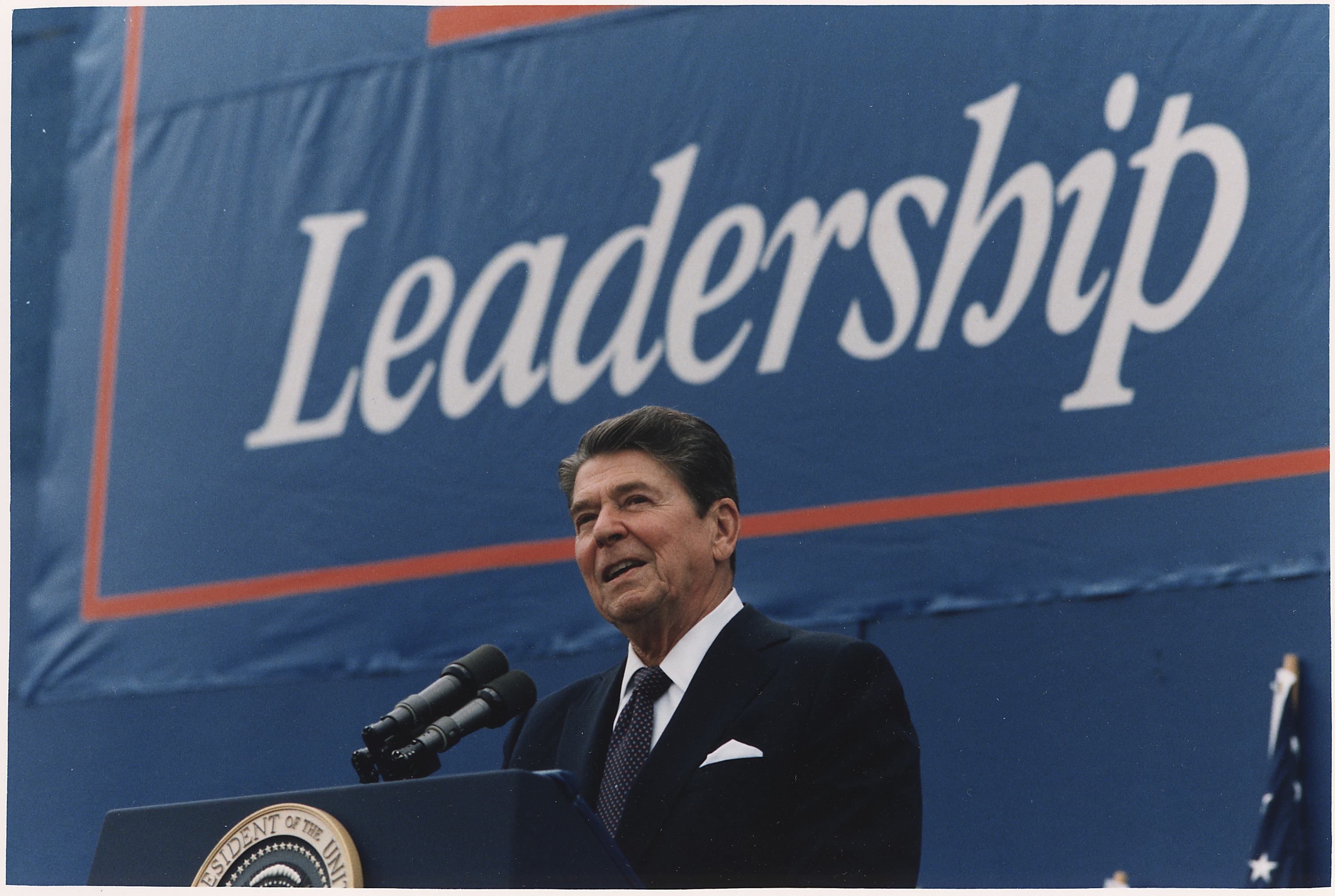
President Reagan giving Campaign speech in Austin, Texas, 1984

Direct effects of political campaign advertising include informing voters about candidates' positions and affecting the "preferences and participatory ethos of the electorate". Voters behavior is shaped by their characteristics like age, gender, education, and socioeconomic status. This means that political advertisements can differ in the way they resonate with certain audiences.

One other effect of political campaign advertising includes greater attitude polarization among voters. In fact one study conducted by Gina Garramone on the effects of political advertising on the political process shows that "by discerning clear differences between candidates, voters may be more likely to strongly like one candidate while strongly disliking the other". This typically leads to higher levels of confidence within voters choices and can widen the degree of participation in the electoral process.

Both positive and negative advertisement have been proven to play different roles in regards to candidate evaluation. Positive ads, which usually start at the beginning of a campaign aim at introducing or reintroducing a candidate through reinforcing his or her positive image and qualities. Whereas a strictly political advertisement would inform the viewer, positive campaign ads become an ongoing discussion of character—people understand more than simply just political identity. In an analysis of the dynamics that exist in campaign advertising, Jim Granato and M.C. Sunny Wong argue that "Not only do voters associate a candidate with a particular party and its policies, but they also assess character and competence of a candidate." Instead of simply representing a candidate by their issues, a candidate is almost created as a character on the screen. These campaigns become affirmations of competency; they give the viewer a multi-faceted understanding of who the candidate is and who the candidate is trying to portray themselves as.

Negative or attack ads have been studied for their effects on memory and ability to shape attitude towards candidates. Both variables are measured to determine the effectiveness of negative ads, which tend to be well remembered. The limitation of this technique is that it can sometimes be highly counterproductive as ads turn out to harm the attacking candidate.

=== United States ===
Political science research generally finds negative advertisement (which has increased over time) to be ineffective both at reducing the support and turnout for the opponent. A 2021 study in the American Political Science Review found that television campaign ads do affect election outcomes, in particular in down-ballot races. According to political scientists Stephen Ansolabehere and Shanto Iyengar, negative ads do succeed at driving down overall turnout though. They also find that "negative ads work better for Republicans than for Democrats, and better for men than for women; unfortunately, negative ads also work better in general than positive ones". Challengers who spend more time campaigning get a higher vote share against incumbents in state house elections. According to political scientist Lynn Vavreck, "the evidence suggests that campaign ads have small effects that decay rapidly—very rapidly—but just enough of the impact accumulates to make running more advertising than your opponent seem a necessity". Her study with Alexander Coppock and Seth J. Hill, which tested 49 political advertisements in 59 experiments on 34,000 people found that the effects of advertising on persuasion were small regardless of context, message, sender, or receiver.

The name of an organization can allow campaigners to separate their political interests from their individual identity. For example, American Civil Rights Institute is an anti-affirmative action group that sounds similar to the American Civil Liberties Union. The two organizations have opposing views on the issue in reality, but the public may confuse the two as sharing the same interests due to their names. These unknown groups also have an advantage of seemingly having no previous associations with voters, as it does not readily reveal the leadership of the organizations to the public. Unknown interests groups are generally perceived as credible. They can also have names that project a sense of shared, common values or interests. However, they can be deceiving as many of these groups' leadership and/or sponsors is actors with less democratic policy than it seems. For example, Californians to Protect Our Right to Vote is sponsored by Pacific Gas & Electric Company. In these cases, the nonprofits names are able to project trustworthiness and expertise while shielding its deceiving donors operating it.

=== Chile ===
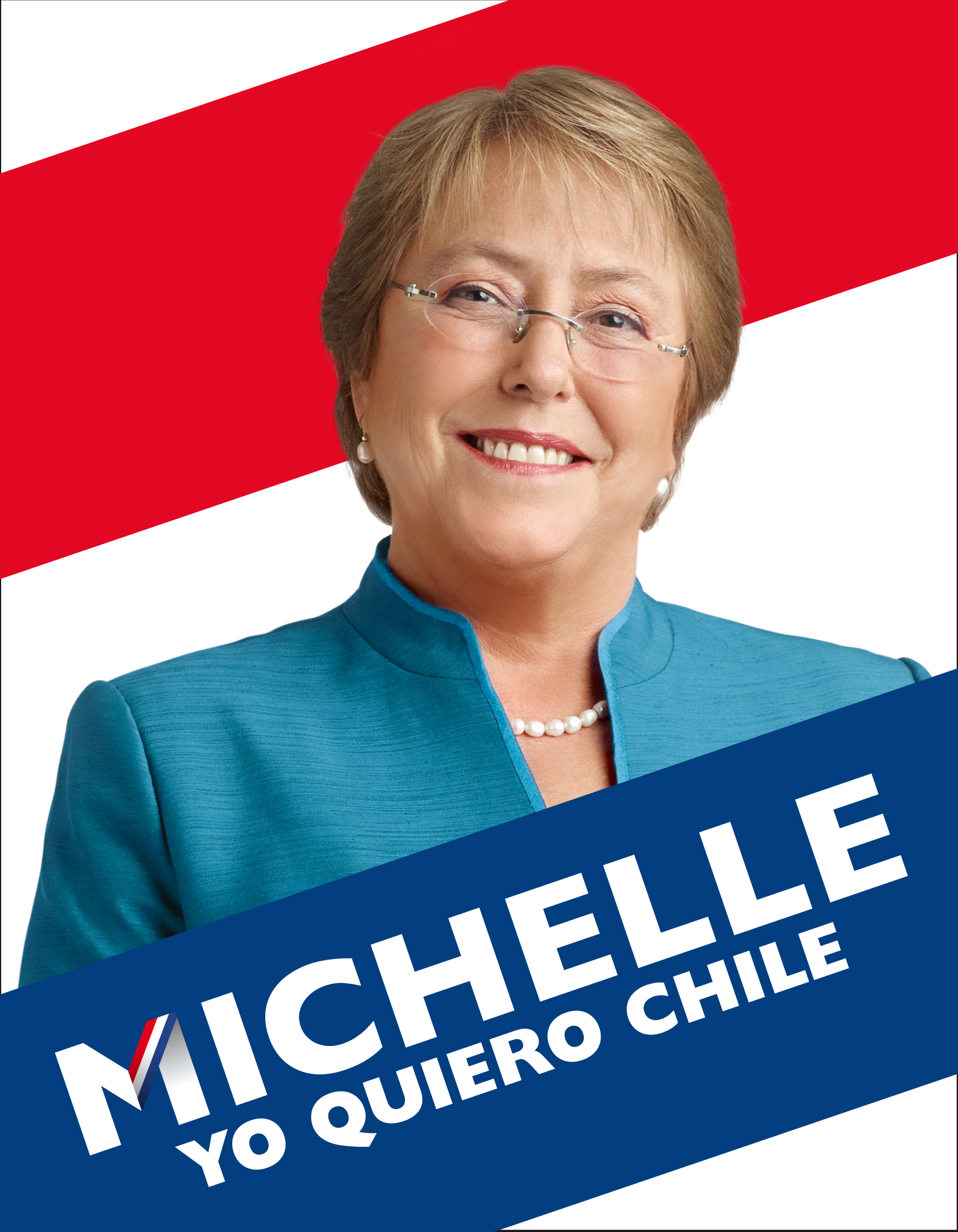
Advertisement from the 2013 Chilean general election for Michelle Bachelet

One of the most historically effective and unprecedented uses of campaign advertising took place in Chile in 1988. Chile's president, General Augusto Pinochet, who was notorious for ordering the torture and killing of political enemies, issued a referendum in which the Chilean people could vote "yes" or "no" on the continuation of his regime. Overconfident in the idea that the majority of Chileans viewed him as a benevolent leader, Pinochet allowed his opposition fifteen minutes of airtime on the national television station each day for the twenty-seven days preceding the October 5 referendum. A creative team composed of Eugenio García, Francisco Celedón, and other members of Chile's Christian Democratic Party undertook the effort to air a hard-hitting and impactful political ad campaign against Pinochet. This campaign differed from many others in that it lacked a candidate or central ideology around which to base itself. Instead of using negative attack ads, the campaign's creators imbued their advertisements with a sense of joy, or "alegría". The campaign was overwhelmingly successful; 3.96 out of 7.2 million votes cast opposed the Pinochet regime. Pinochet stepped down peacefully in 1990, passing on leadership to a democratic civilian government. The results for this election were believed to have large-scale effects for worldwide democracy.

=== European Union ===
Campaign advertising looks different in each country in the European Union. For example, 43% of the broadcast campaign advertisements in the United Kingdom were negative, 29% were negative in the Netherlands, and 18% were negative in Germany. The effects of these campaign ads can be different as well. A study looked at the differences between positive and negative campaign advertisements in countries in Central Europe. People in different countries responded to the ads differently. In Croatia, they showed a high emotional response and responded best to positive advertisements. In the Czech Republic, they showed a mix of emotional and logical responses and responded to both the positive and negative campaign ads. In Hungary, they showed a very logical response, so analytical advertisements were most effective. In Poland, they had a weaker response to both advertisements, but responded better to the positive ads. One strategy for campaign advertisements will not work the same for every country, even if the countries are close to each other. Another study compared two types of campaign advertisements and determined which was most effective. One of the campaign advertisements focused on the benefits of the EU policies, and the other focused on the low costs of membership. Both showed an increase in support, but the advertisements that focused on the benefits were more effective.

== List of election advertising techniques ==
- Attack ad
- Bumper sticker
- Campaign button
- Canvassing
- Direct marketing
- Election promise
- Get out the vote
- Lawn sign
- Negative campaigning
- Opposition research
- Personalized audio messaging
- Political text messaging
- Posters
- Push poll

== See also ==
- Election promise
- I approve this message
- Public service announcement

== Sources ==
- Croteau, D., & Hoynes, W. (2003). Media Society. Thousand Oaks, CA: Sage Publications
- Diamond, E., & Bates, S. (1992). The Spot: The Rise of Political Advertising on Television, 3rd Edition. Massachusetts Institute of Technology.
- Dretzin, R. (Director), & Goodman, B. (Director). (2004). The Persuaders. [Frontline Documentary]. United States: Public Broadcasting Systems.
- Museum of the Moving Image. (2010). The Living Room Candidate. Retrieved March 18, 2011
- Straubhaar, J., LaRose, R., & Davenport, L. (2010). Media Now: Understanding Media, Culture, and Technology. Boston: Cengage Learning.
