= Shuttleworth (canvassing) =

In the United Kingdom, Shuttleworths are lists of people canvassed to be likely to vote for a particular political party in an electoral campaign. "Shuttleworth" was the Liberal Democrat name for the scheme.

The idea was that on Election Day once someone is determined to have voted, they are crossed off the list, thus maintaining an always up-to-date record of voters who have not yet been out to vote. Originally, they were usually printed on multi-sheet Carbonless copy paper so that successive updated copies for each street can progressively be torn off and given to party election workers as a list of doors to knock on. They were known as Mikardo pads after Ian Mikardo in the Labour party and as Reading pads in the Conservative party - in both cases because of the original invention, using carbon paper during the 1945 General Election in the Reading constituency, won by Mikardo. This method is largely superseded by first EARS and then VAN software (named Connect in the UK) for the Liberal Democrats, MERLIN for the Conservative Party and Contact Creator for the Labour Party.

== See also ==
- Get out the vote (GOTV)
- Telling
- Voter File
