= Shuttleworth =

Shuttleworth may refer to:

- Shuttleworth (surname)
- Shuttleworth, Greater Manchester (historically in Lancashire), a hamlet at the northeastern extremity of the Metropolitan Borough of Bury, England
- Shuttleworth (canvassing)
- The Shuttleworth Collection, an aeronautical and automotive museum located at the Old Warden airfield in Bedfordshire, England
- Shuttleworth College (Bedfordshire), a further education college in Bedfordshire, England
- Shuttleworth College (Lancashire), an 11–16 mixed comprehensive school in Burnley, England
- Shuttleworth Foundation
- The Shuttleworths, British comedy show

== See also ==
- Shuttleworth & Ingersoll a law firm in Iowa, US
- Shuttlesworth, a surname
