= Blockwalking =

Political canvassing technique

Blockwalking (or foot canvassing) is the most common political canvassing technique in which volunteers or paid staffers walk door-to-door to initiate direct contact with individuals for political campaigning, grassroots fundraising, community awareness, membership drives, and more. Blockwalking is used by political parties and issue groups to identify supporters, persuade the undecided, add voters to the voters list through voter registration, and is central to get out the vote operations. It is the core element of what political campaigns call the ground game or field.

== Practice ==
Blockwalking may be conducted by a candidate, volunteers, and/or paid canvassers. Blockwalkers are given lists known as walk lists (or access to a canvassing app). These are lists of households to be contacted, generated from a voter database. What used to be paper lists have been mostly replaced with lists on tablet or smartphone apps.

The blockwalker will try to contact each of the households on their list, and deliver a script containing questions and persuasive messaging provided by the campaign. Almost all election blockwalking includes asking how a person plans to vote whereas issue blockwalking may be intent on getting individuals interested in particular issues. Supporters may then be asked themselves to vote, donate, volunteer, or to take a lawn sign. People who are wavering or undecided may be given a message of persuasion. If no one is home the blockwalker will typically drop literature on the person's door for them to read when they get home.

During the blockwalk the results will be entered into the voter database. This will update the campaign's list of voters, removing those who have moved or are deceased and adding new supporters who may have been found. The data on the questions will be used for further contact, a supporter may be added to a list for get out the vote or fundraising, while a hostile voter might be dropped from future contact.

In the United States, blockwalking hit its all-time low during the 1996 election, with the lowest reported rates of political volunteering, and the lowest recorded voter turnout. Political scientists began to reassess the effects of canvassing. In the United States Alan S. Gerber and Donald Green launched a series of controlled experiments, and demonstrated that blockwalking was one of the most effective tools available to boost voter turnout.

== See also ==
- Canvassing
- Direct marketing
- Get out the vote
- Leaflet distribution
- Political campaigning
- Political consulting
