= Shuttleworth (surname) =

Shuttleworth is an English surname that originated from the place name Shuttleworth, either in Lancashire, in Yorkshire, or in Derbyshire.

The name may refer to:

- A. R. B. Shuttleworth (1873–1935), British politician
- Anna Shuttleworth (1927–2021), British cellist
- Archie Shuttleworth, character from Coronation Street played by Roy Hudd
- Bobby Shuttleworth, American goalkeeper
- Charles Shuttleworth, Canadian politician
- Daryl Shuttleworth, Canadian actor
- Edward Shuttleworth (1866–1943), British civil servant in Burma
- Edythe Shuttleworth (1907–1983), Canadian mezzo-soprano
- Sir James Kay-Shuttleworth, 1st Baronet, English politician
- Jane and John Shuttleworth, co-founders of Mother Earth News magazine
- John Shuttleworth (industrialist), English industrialist
- John Shuttleworth (character), created by English comic actor Graham Fellows
- Ken Shuttleworth (architect) (born 1952), English architect
- Ken Shuttleworth (cricketer) (1944–2025), English cricketer
- Mark Shuttleworth, South African entrepreneur
- Obadiah Shuttleworth, English composer
- Rachel Kay-Shuttleworth (1886–1967), English textile collector
- Richard Shuttleworth, see disambiguation
- Robert James Shuttleworth, (1810–1874) Swiss-British malacologist
- Timothy Shuttleworth (born 1997), British swimmer
- Ughtred Kay-Shuttleworth, 1st Baron Shuttleworth, British politician

== See also ==
- Shuttlesworth
