= Nomenclator =

Nomenclator may refer to:

- Nomenclator omnium rerum propria nomina variis linguis explicata indicans, 16th century book written by Hadrianus Junius
- Nomenclator, in cryptography, a kind of substitution cypher
- Nomenclator (slave), a slave in ancient Rome who reminded their masters of the names and pertinent information of those they met on political campaigns
- Nomenclator, in biology, a publication listing taxonomic information akin to a taxonomic database
- Nomenclator of Leiden University Library, the first printed institutional library catalog

== See also ==
- Nomenclature, a system of names or terms
