= Political text messaging in the United States =

Text messages sent for political purposes

Political text messaging is the practice of sending text messages as part of a political ad campaign. It has grown significantly as a practice in election cycles in the United States since the late 2010s.

== Growth of political text messaging ==
Text messaging as a tool for voter mobilization and campaigning has been explored for decades; many researchers had been using text messages to increase voter participation. Text messages as a form of political messaging had previously been used sparingly, though the Bernie Sanders 2016 campaign used text messaging as a significant arm of its outreach. However, more recent elections have had significant increases in text messaging, due to decreased costs of texting compared to traditional canvassing. Changes in voter behavior, such as increased smart phone usage, and decreased phone call interaction, have also encouraged political text messaging. Even if only a small minority of individuals respond to each text message, the low cost and large numbers of texts sent out makes political text messaging useful.

There is federal law against sending massive automated texts without consent. However, political campaign texts are often exempt from this law. A 2021 Supreme Court decision (Facebook Inc. vs Duguid et al.) further loosened regulations, suggesting that political texts do not violate a federal ban on robocalls and political campaigns did not need to get recipients' consent as long as they do not use randomly generated numbers. Many political parties and operations are able to retrieve publicly available voter registration information from state election registers, including exact phone numbers. Many also use political data brokers for additional information to target text message recipients. The New York Times reported that enacting meaningful consumer protections will likely require an act of Congress.

In the 2022 election cycle, Americans received more than 15 billion political text messages. The 2024 election cycle is expected to vastly exceed the political text messages received in 2022. Republicans outpaced Democrats by a 2 to 1 ratio with political text messaging during the 2022 cycle. In 2022, as a result of the increase in text messaging, political text messages made up the largest source of complaints to the FCC. Many Americans had a negative reaction to the texts, seeing them as a violation of privacy, and objecting to their often apocalyptic tone and artificial sense of urgency. Political misinformation is another problem, as according to The New York Times, the texts became "a handy method for political actors to quietly propagate the same kind of divisiveness and disinformation that already abounds on social media — only away from the public scrutiny of academic researchers, fact-checking groups and journalists."
