= Postcards To Voters =

U.S. political volunteer organization

Postcards to Voters
- Formation: March 11, 2017; 9 years ago
- Founder: Tony McMullin
- Type: Volunteer organization
- Location: Kennesaw, Georgia, U.S.
- Website: postcardstovoters.org

Postcards To Voters is a group of American volunteers who write postcards to targeted voters in the hope of increasing Democratic turnout in close, key elections across the country.

== History ==
Founded and registered in 2018 as an LLC by Tony McMullin, the group started informally in March 2017 with a handful of volunteers who wrote postcards in support of Georgia congressional candidate Jon Ossoff. By November 2018 it had grown to nearly 40,000 volunteers from every state in the U.S., including Alaska and Hawaii. By March 2020, according to the founder, it had grown to more than 70,000 volunteers and had sent almost 7 million postcards. While not every volunteer who signed up for Postcards To Voters is still actively participating, approximately 9000 unique volunteers request addresses each month. Volunteers write and often decorate the postcards by hand, paying for their own supplies and postage.

McMullin uses technology to keep the organization running smoothly. He has an interactive texting system, called Abby, that was created and donated by a volunteer. Additionally, address lists are "seeded" with addresses belonging to members of the group to verify that the postcards are being written as prescribed.

Operational costs for Postcards To Voters are funded through the sale of postcards and monetary donations. There are more than a dozen postcard designs available for sale on Amazon, Etsy, and on the Postcards To Voters website; however, volunteers are free to buy postcards from other vendors. Free downloadable templates are also available. Further funding is provided by MyPostcard and the Out Loud Shop, where a portion of their merchandise sales benefit the organization. Campaigns pay nothing for the service, but if a candidate is happy with the service they are asked to be a reference for future campaigns. Additionally, in an effort to help candidates, Postcards To Voters teamed up with Ragtag, an organization that can assist candidates build an online presence.

During a 2018 interview, McMullin said he quit his job in order to run his group full-time in advance of the 2018 midterm elections. In a 2020 podcast interview, McMullin stated that in the two months before the midterms, the group wrote nearly 2 million postcards for 32 campaigns. He said he was supporting himself by doing occasional consulting work and selling postcards.

Since the group's founding, many other volunteer organizations have begun sending handwritten postcards and letters to voters in hopes of increasing voter turnout, in addition to phonebanking, textbanking, and traditional canvassing.

== See also ==
- Craftivism
- Get out the vote
