= Canvassing =

Systematic initiation of direct contact with individuals

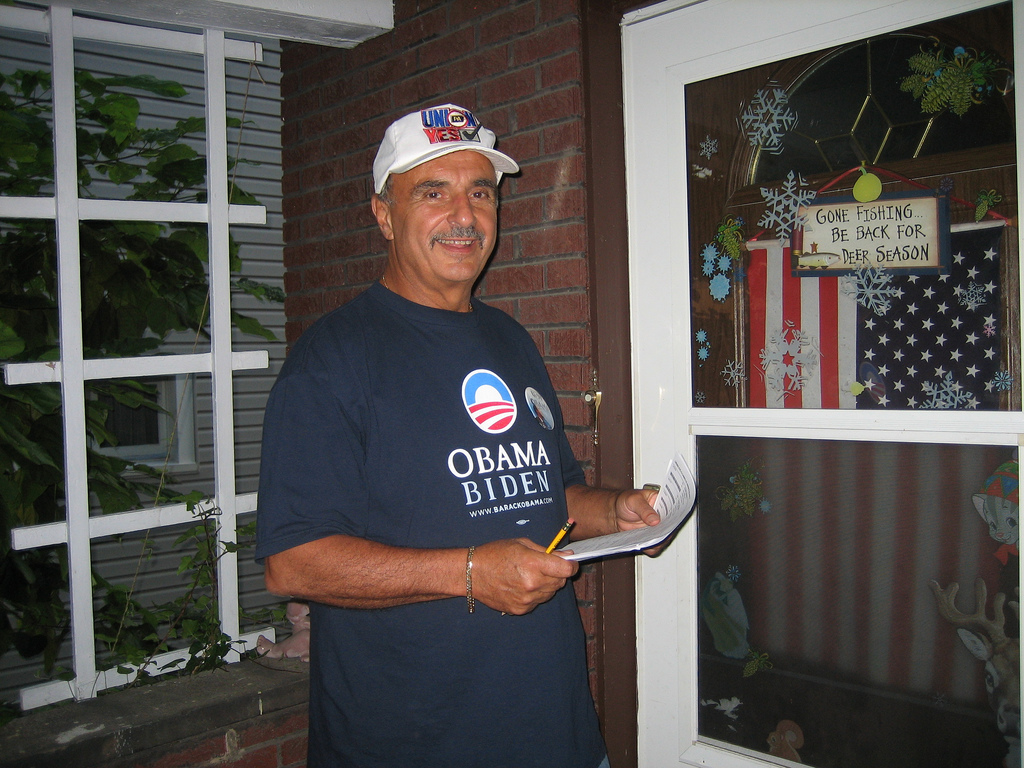
Pennsylvania AFL-CIO President Bill George door-to-door canvassing for Obama in 2008

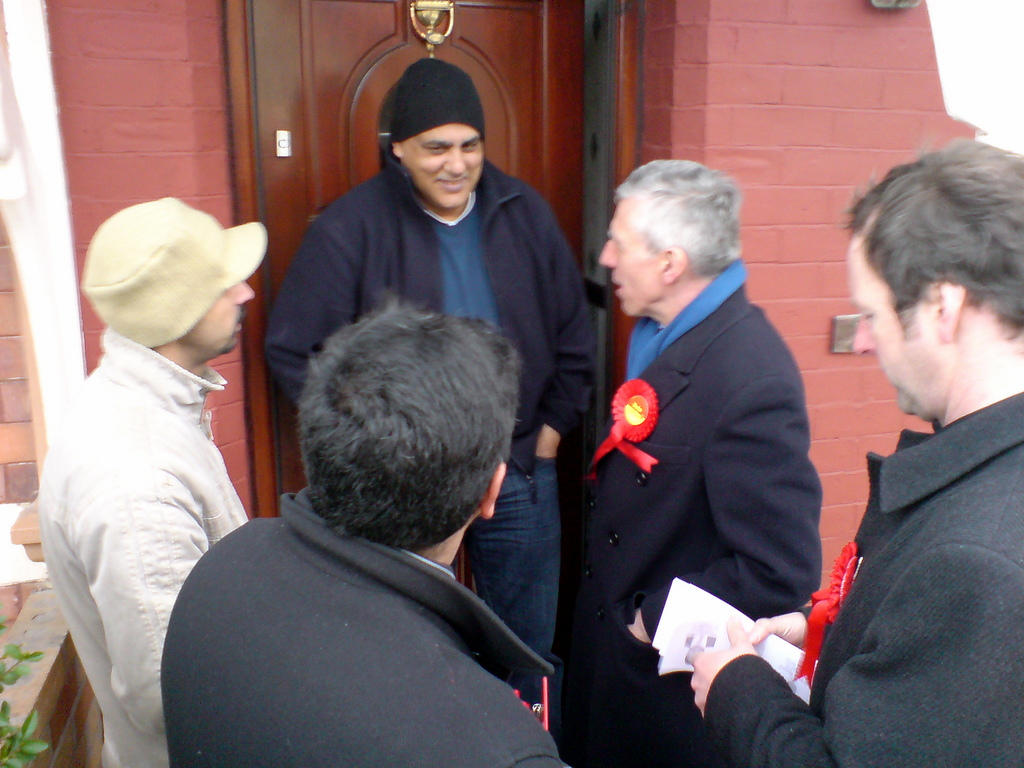
British politician Jack Straw (on the right with a red rosette) canvassing with local councilors in Blackburn, Lancashire, in 2008

Canvassing, also known as door knocking or phone banking, is the systematic initiation of direct contact with individuals, commonly used during political campaigns. Canvassing can be done for many reasons: political campaigning, grassroots fundraising, community awareness, membership drives, and more. Canvassing is used by political parties and issue groups to identify supporters, persuade the undecided, and add voters to the voters list through voter registration, and it is central to get out the vote operations. It is the core element of what political campaigns call the ground game or field.

Organized political canvassing became a central tool of contested election campaigns in Britain, and has remained a core practice performed by thousands of volunteers at each election there, and in many countries with similar political systems.

Canvassing can also refer to a neighborhood canvass performed by law enforcement in the course of an investigation. This is a systematic approach to interviewing residents, merchants, and others who are in the immediate vicinity of a crime and may have useful information.

In the United States, the compilation of election returns and validation of the outcome that forms the basis of the official results, i.e. vote counting, is also called canvassing.

== Practice ==
A modern election canvass may be conducted by a candidate, volunteers, or paid canvassers. The canvassers are given lists known as canvass sheets (or access to a canvassing app) or in the UK as reading pads. These are a list of households to be contacted, generated from a voter database. Some campaigns today have replaced paper sheets with tablet or smartphone apps.

The canvasser will try to contact each of the households on their list, and deliver a script containing questions and persuasive messaging provided by the campaign. Almost all election canvassing includes asking how a person plans to vote. Supporters may then be asked themselves to volunteer, or to take a lawn sign. Those who are wavering or undecided may be given a message of persuasion. If foot canvassing, the canvasser may also distribute flyers.

During the canvass, the results will be entered into the voter database. This will update the campaign's list of voters, removing those who have moved or are deceased and adding new residents who may have been found. The data on the questions will be used for further contact, a supporter may be added to a list for get out the vote or fundraising, while a hostile voter might be dropped from future contact.

Most canvassers are prepared with a thorough script that they use at the door. Most are encouraged not to go off-script in order to avoid making false claims or misrepresenting the party they are advocating for. Canvassers aim to speak clearly and be personable while canvassing to create meaningful conversations and perhaps sway the undecided. They identify one's target audience, keep conversations courteous, and employ social engineering techniques to promote the message.

== History ==
=== Origins ===
The origin of the term is an older spelling of "canvas", to sift by shaking in a sheet of canvas, hence to discuss thoroughly.

An organized canvass can be seen as early as the elections in the Roman Republic. In those campaigns candidates would shake the hands of all eligible voters in the Forum. Whispering into the ear of some candidates would be a nomenclator, a slave who had been trained to memorize the names of all the voters, so that the candidate could greet them all by name.

Modern canvassing can be traced back to the rise of contested elections in England. For the first centuries of the English Parliament elections were rarely contested. Losing an election was considered a dishonor to oneself, and to friends and family. Campaigning thus involved quiet sounding out of the small pool of voters. Only once this process had convinced a candidate that he had enough votes to win would he declare his interest in the seat.

Beginning in the Elizabethan era, and expanding during the conflicts under the Stuarts, elections began to be openly contested. Canvassing was a controversial strategy. In both 1604 and 1626 canvassing for votes was banned. It was seen as a violation to free elections, as votes would be won by persuasion rather than a voter making up his own mind. Despite this, by the late 17th century, canvassing was standard practice in English elections. Rival campaigns would attempt a full canvass of all voters, which even in the largest districts would only be a few thousand people.

I got sixty eight promises in Oundle and its neighbourhood today, and only one refusal. Some doubtful, but most not at home, with who I left printed cards requesting their votes.

— Lord Althorp describing his day of canvassing in Northamptonshire in the 1806 general election

There were many reasons why candidates invested much time and money in canvassing. As in the previous tradition of sounding out supporters before announcing, many candidates would use the canvass to determine their level of support, and would drop out before election day if it proved insufficient. Part of the concern would be financial. Campaigning was expensive in an era when voters expected to be plied with food and drink. In this period the candidates had to cover the costs of the election itself. If candidates did not find enough votes during their canvass they would drop out before wasting more money on a losing campaign.

Building the list of voters was also important, as only some districts kept full poll books. Legal wrangling over who met the property requirements to vote was important in many campaigns, and canvassing was used to add supporters to the rolls, while investigating the claims of opponents. The growing list of supporters would also be essential to an election day operation. In early elections all voters had to travel to a central town, often some distance from their home, and polling could last several days. During this time voters would be away from their work and their fields. As an example of the challenges, one losing candidate had identified 639 supporters in Kent for the Short Parliament election of 1640, but only 174 voted, most going home after finding out the polling would take three days.

=== Persuasion and corruption ===
A candidate would also make sure to knock on as many doors as possible to win over the voters. Speaking to as many voters as possible was seen as an essential tool to win the "wavering multitudes."

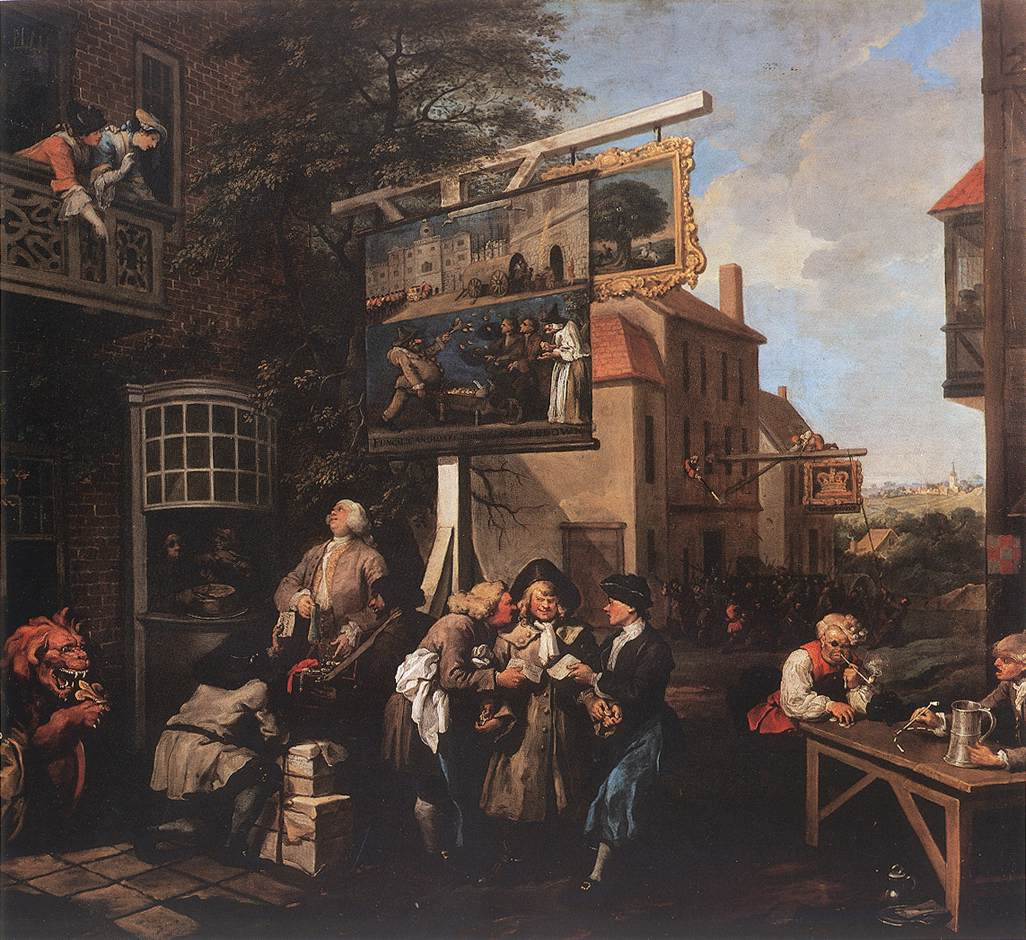
William Hogarth's 1754 depiction of the disreputable job of canvassing for votes

By the 18th century canvassing was standard practice, but this was also an era of gross electoral corruption, and canvassing was used to bribe and threaten voters, as famously depicted in William Hogarth's Humours of an Election series of paintings. Most directly this would take the form of direct bribes to voters. This was the practice in only a minority of districts, but in some areas large bribes had become habitual. In areas without direct bribery, candidates were expected to provide food, drink and banquets. For the priciest campaigns, these various costs added up to sums equivalent to several million pounds in today's money, causing financial hardship even for wealthy candidates.

In the first elections held in the United States, canvassing was rare. Most elections were uncontested, and even in races with multiple candidates it was considered improper for a candidate to campaign on his own behalf. As the party system developed in the early 19th century, elections became more contested and voluntary associations developed to work on candidates' behalf. As in the United Kingdom, canvassing became an important part of their operations, and they would attempt to visit each voter in a district.

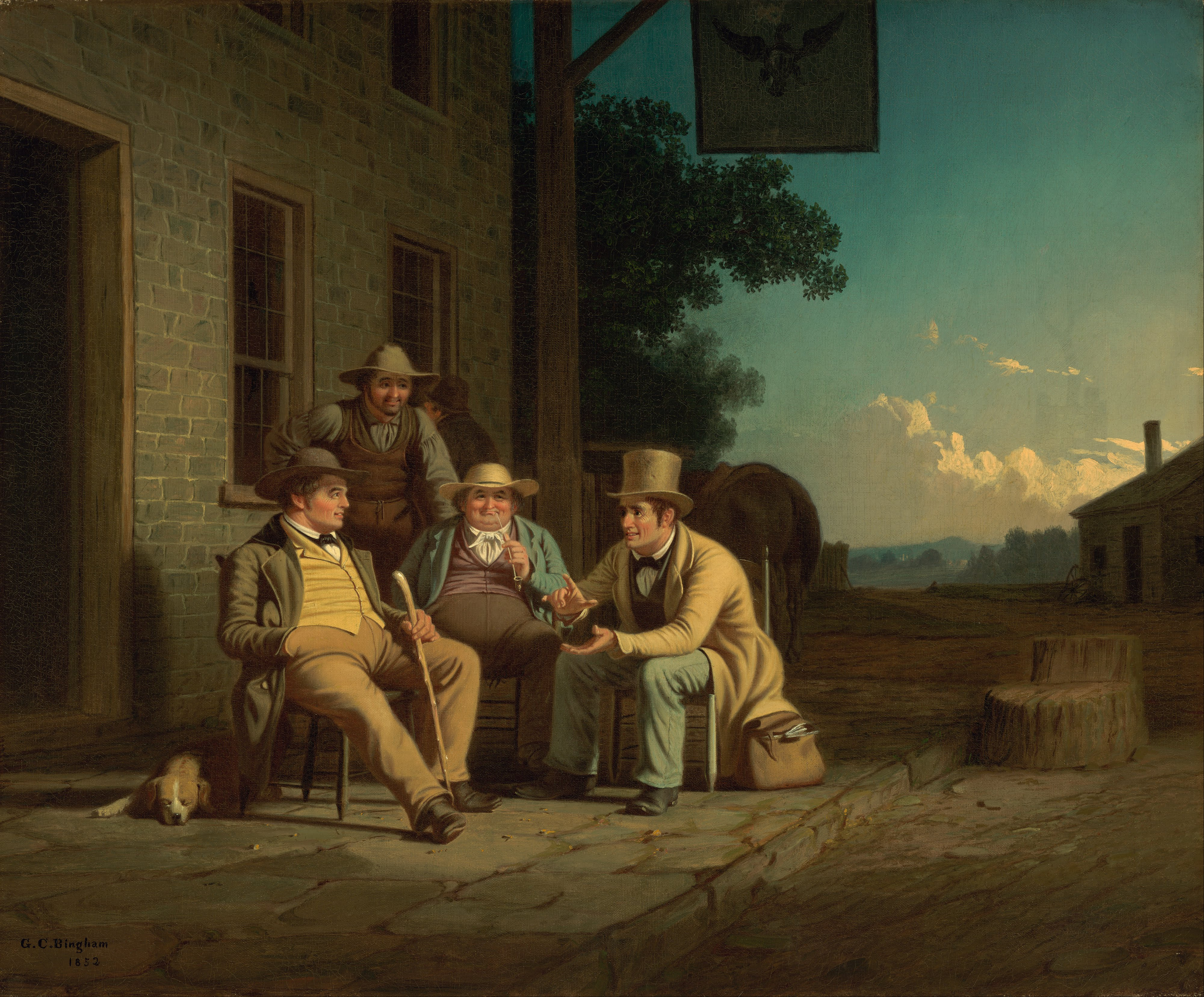
George Caleb Bingham's positive portrayal of a candidate canvassing in the United States in 1852

This system soon became a venue for gross corruption. Machine politics developed in the large cities of the eastern US. Winning candidates would reward their supporters with patronage appointments, and direct bribery was also common; one study estimated that 20% of New York voters were compensated for their votes during Gilded Age elections.

In the United Kingdom, the Reform Act 1832 attacked corruption and expanded the franchise. This, combined with the growing strength of the national parties, transformed canvassing. There were no lists of who was eligible to vote under the new law, and it was up to individual voters to register themselves. The parties launched mass canvasses with the goal of adding all of the party's supporters to the electoral roll. As an example, in Norwich the 1874 saw 3000 Liberal and 2000 Conservative paid workers engaged in voter registration. The massive paid canvassing came to an end with the Corrupt and Illegal Practices Prevention Act 1883, which limited campaign spending. Thus the armies of paid canvassers were replaced with smaller volunteer efforts. Laws were also changed in the United Kingdom to make voter registration almost automatic, removing the need for the parties to expend efforts on it.

=== Voter identification and decline ===
As corruption faded, parties returned to using canvassing to win votes through persuasion and get-out-the-vote (GOTV) efforts. This was especially true of the new socialist parties such as the Labour Party in the United Kingdom, and the CCF in Canada who had little money but enthusiastic volunteer bases who could be deployed to door steps.

The years after the Second World War saw a general decline in canvassing. Political scientists began to question the utility of traditional campaigns. The Michigan model of voter behaviour became the accepted wisdom. It argued that voters had deep-set partisan loyalties, and that changes in such loyalties take years to develop. A simple knock on the door will do nothing to change a voter's opinion. Parties thus switched their canvassing resources away from persuading voters, focusing only on identifying their supporters and making sure they voted. The British Labour Party adopted the Reading System developed by Ian Mikardo to win the Reading constituency in 1945. It was based on concentrating exclusively on pro-Labour areas and boosting their turnout, while ignoring non-supporters.

Even these approaches were found wanting. David Butler in his Nuffield Model of UK elections found that during the 1950s and 1960s, local campaigns had no effect on the results. With the rise of television, resources were shifted from the ground to mass market advertising, with canvassing seen as a relic of the past. Ivor Crewe argued that "constituency organizing counts for next to nothing in the television age." One political scientist wrote there was a belief that canvassing was an "elaborate ritual bringing some sense of gratification to the participants, but making no difference to election results."

=== Revival ===
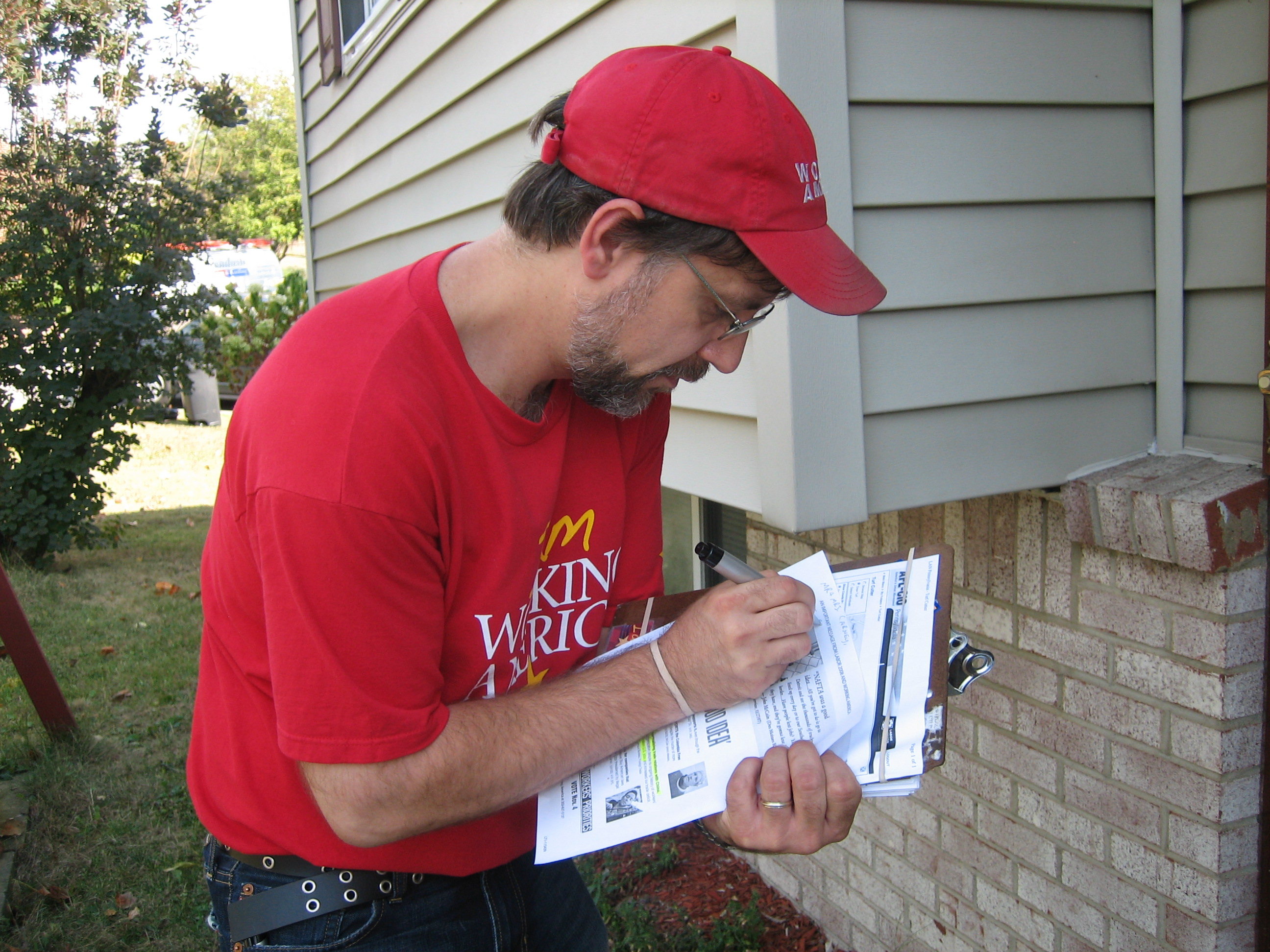
An AFL–CIO canvasser in the 2008 American election

In the United States, canvassing hit its all-time low during the 1996 election, with the lowest reported rates of political volunteering, and the lowest recorded voter turnout. Political scientists began to reassess the effects of canvassing. In Britain new studies found that unlike in earlier decades, a strong field campaign was having an effect on the result. In the United States Alan S. Gerber and Donald Green launched a series of controlled experiments, and demonstrated that foot canvassing was one of the most effective tools available to boost voter turnout.

The years since 2000 have seen a widespread revival of election canvassing. An intensive effort by the Al Gore campaign of 2000 was credited with gaining several points on election day in the 2000 election, enough to win the popular vote despite being down several points in the polls the day before. Subsequently, the Republicans launched their 72 Hour Program of get out the vote efforts over the last three days of a campaign, and also found demonstrable proof that it gained them several points in key races. The Obama campaigns of 2008 and 2012 were especially noted for dedicating resources to a field program.

New technologies changed how canvassing was conducted. While door-to-door blockwalking has been, prior to COVID-19, the most common canvassing technique, canvassing can also be done via phone, texting, and social media. Expansive databases of the electorate, such as the Democrats' NGP VAN, pulled together canvassing data, consumer information, and demographic profiles to allow precise targeting of voters. No longer would campaigns knock on all the doors in a district, rather voters who would most be persuaded to support the candidate or come out to vote could be targeted. Large campaigns incorporated A/B testing into their canvassing, to further hone and improve its effectiveness.

== Around the world ==
Originating in the United Kingdom, canvassing is most widespread in those countries that have borrowed from the British political system. It is standard practice in elections in Ireland, the United States, Canada, Australia, and New Zealand. In India, despite the million or more voters in many constituencies, parties have made the effort to have canvassers visit the door of each house in each village.

Door-to-door canvassing has been little known in most other countries. It has been used in several Latin American countries, including Brazil and Chile. By utilizing newer technological resources like WhatsApp, voter turnout has increased among younger voters in Brazil. After the highly publicized canvassing tactics of the Obama campaign, similar tactics have been tried in France and Germany.

In Scandinavia door-to-door canvassing was an accepted part of election campaigning in the first half of the 20th century, but has since faded. It still exists, but an activist knocking on someone's door is considered somewhat unseemly. More widespread workplace canvasses have been organized, either by labour unions or by employers.

In Pakistan, it has been found that canvassing is effective in increasing voter turnout and in facilitating political conversation when catered towards the men and women in the household.

In America, there seems to be a consensus that door-to-door canvassing might not be as important to young and BIPOC voters as online engagement canvassing is. Although Trump's campaign with a lot of door-to-door canvassing did get him a second win, the way he got it was through convincing his voters to go canvass themselves instead of Trump's campaign hiring people to canvass.

Canvassing for votes is forbidden in Japan due to fear of leftist control. This has been the case since the original General Election Law of 1925. The restrictions have been brought to the Supreme Court on several occasions, but have been upheld as constitutional.

== Effectiveness ==
There has been a long history of studying the effectiveness of canvassing beginning with a 1927 study by Harold Foote Gosnell. Through the 1980s, a series of both controlled and natural experiments created a consensus that canvassing had a small effect on turnout, and no observable persuasive effect on whom to vote for.

In 1999, Gerber and Green published their first paper presenting a rigorously controlled experiment that produced a substantial turnout boost from canvassing in a municipal election in New Haven, Connecticut. This study revived interest in the subject. Since then Gerber, Green, and other political scientists have conducted a program that verified those results, and tested what techniques are most effective. Foot canvassing is the most effective contact method, increasing turnout by about 7 percentage points, while phoning boosts it by 2.6 points. Other contact techniques such as direct mail, robocalls, and email have small to undetectable effects. Other studies have found that canvassing can do more to boost turnout, and also win new votes at the door through persuasion.

In the city of Duisburg in Germany, another study was conducted to compare the effectivity of in-person canvassing versus mail-in surveys. This research was done in 2022 so volunteer canvassers followed health precautions during their research. The 11 canvassers found that the simpleness of coming door to door, with a small cash motivation, was more effective than mail-in surveys.

A 2018 study in the American Economic Review found that door-to-door canvassing on behalf of the François Hollande campaign in the 2012 French presidential election "did not affect turnout, but increased Hollande's vote share in the first round and accounted for one fourth of his victory margin in the second. Visits' impact persisted in later elections, suggesting a lasting persuasion effect."

There are some studies that suggest that canvassing is less effective in certain European nations. In an article from the British Journal of Political Science, they found some evidence that the effectiveness in European canvassing activities is far less compared to the United States, compiling several studies of canvassing in Denmark. However, the paper did not come to one conclusion on the cause of this discrepancy.

== British example script ==
The following is an excerpt from a script used by the UK Labour Party in the buildup to a general election for telephone canvassing:

Hello, can I speak to (voter's name) please? Hello (voter's name) my name is (name). I'm calling on behalf of (MP/parliamentary spokesperson). I'm calling to find out your views on the Labour government's priorities. Which of the following do you think are the three most important priorities for the government? [Lists five policy areas – 'better schools', 'better hospitals', 'more jobs', 'less crime' and 'strong economy'] Let me tell you what Labour is doing in these areas and what the Tories would do if they were re-elected [refers to 'dividing lines' table where Conservative policies are compared unfavourably with Labour]. Now can I ask you which party you think you will vote for at the next general election?

The script then divides into two sections based on whether the voter intends to support Labour or another party. The section for Labour supporters encourages the use of postal votes, asks whether the individual would consider displaying a poster in their window or deliver leaflets on their street and asks whether the individual would consider joining the party. The section for non-Labour voters asks the following questions:

1. Which main political party do you identify with?
2. There will be elections in (date), which party will you vote for at these elections?
3. How did you vote in the last general election?
4. Who would be your second choice?
5. Do you vote at every election?

== Legality ==
=== United States constitutionality ===
Local governments in the United States have passed local laws to limit Americans' ability to canvass. Many of these challenges escalated to the Supreme Court, which has ruled overwhelmingly on the side of the public's right to canvass as protected by the First Amendment. For example, in Martin v. Struthers, Justice Hugo Black stated:

Freedom to distribute information to every citizen wherever he desires to receive it is so clearly vital to the preservation of a free society that ... it must be fully preserved. To require a censorship through license which makes impossible the free and unhampered distribution of pamphlets strikes at the very heart of the constitutional guarantees.

In 2002, the Supreme Court reconfirmed its conviction that canvassing is protected by U.S. First Amendment rights in Watchtower Society v. Village of Stratton. Justice John Paul Stevens stated:

It is offensive, not only to the values protected by the First Amendment, but to the very notion of a free society that in the context of everyday public discourse a citizen must first inform the government of her desire to speak to her neighbors and then obtain a permit to do so.

=== United Kingdom ===
Representation of the People Act 1983 makes canvassing at polling stations in the UK illegal and only telling is permitted.

== See also ==
- Deep canvassing
- Direct marketing
- Get out the vote
- Leaflet distribution
- Political consulting
