= NGP VAN =

American voter database and web hosting service provider

NGP VAN, Inc.
- Type: Private
- Industry: Voter databases, IT consulting, software as a service, web hosting service, online fundraising, new media technology
- Founder: Mark Sullivan, Nathaniel Pearlman
- Headquarters: Washington, DC, United States
- Area served: United States
- Key people: Chelsea Peterson Thompson (General Manager); Alex Stanton (Chief Operating Officer/COO); Lou Levine (Senior vice-president; SVP of Customer Strategy)
- Revenue: ▲US$ 28.9m (2016)
- Number of employees: ▲190 (2016)
- Parent: Bonterra; Apax Partners
- Divisions: Fundraising/Compliance; Organizing; Digital; Non-Profits
- Website: ngpvan.com

NGP VAN, Inc. is an American privately owned voter database and web hosting service provider used by the Democratic Party, Democratic campaigns, and other non-profit organizations authorized by the Democratic Party. The platform or service is used by political and social campaigns for fundraising, campaign finance compliance, field organizing, and digital organizing. NGP VAN, Inc. was formerly known as Voter Activation Network, Inc. and changed its name to NGP VAN, Inc. in January 2011. The company was founded in 2001 and is based in Washington, D.C.

In 2009, the company was the largest partisan provider of campaign compliance software, used by most Democratic members of Congress. The company's services have been utilized by clients such as the Obama 2008 presidential campaign, the Obama 2012 presidential campaign, the Hillary Rodham Clinton 2016 presidential campaign, the Bernie Sanders 2016 presidential campaign, the British Liberal Democrats, and the Liberal Party of Canada.

The company was acquired by London-based private equity firm Apax Partners in 2021 and conducted layoffs in 2023. Persistent technical issues have led to concerns from workers and the Democratic party that NGP VAN may be unable or unwilling to meet their needs. In the lead-up to the 2024 elections significant problems with the NGP VAN system led the Kamala Harris campaign and the Democratic National Committee (DNC) to intervene by sending full time technical staff to keep it afloat through the election.

== History ==
NGP VAN was created in November 2010 by the merger of its two predecessor companies: NGP Software (founded in 1997 by Nathaniel Pearlman, who later served as chief technology officer for Hillary Clinton's 2008 presidential campaign, in his attic in Washington, DC), and Voter Activation Network (founded in 2001 by Mark Sullivan, in his study in Cambridge, Massachusetts).

In October 2014, NGP VAN launched their EveryAction fundraising management platform for non-profits.

There are occasional accusations that the Democratic Party has restricted access to Votebuilder to hold off a challenge to an incumbent office holder in a primary. For example, Rachel Ventura, running against an incumbent Democrat in IL-11, was told "I've heard from our Executive Director. Your request for Votebuilder for Illinois' 11th Congressional District through the Democratic Party of Illinois has been denied due to our regulations that we don't issue subscriptions to candidates challenging an incumbent."

In 2019, the company made three acquisitions; ActionKit, BSD Tools from Blue State Digital, and DonorTrends.

In 2021, NGP VAN's parent company, EveryAction, Inc., was acquired by London-based private equity firm Apax Partners. The company also named Amanda Coulombe President of NGP VAN. In January 2023, the company laid off 10% of their workforce. The Intercept reported that employees and Democratic strategists worried NGP VAN was prioritizing profits over the needs of the Democratic Party, which the company has an effective monopoly over. A second round of layoffs was conducted on September 6, 2023.

In early 2023, an internal Democratic National Committee (DNC) memo expressed concern that NGP VAN's system was "inflexible, slow and unreliable, particularly during periods of peak use." In early 2024 the DNC privately considered invoking a clause in its agreement with NGP VAN to access the system's source code and change providers, but chose not to. After Kamala Harris became the 2024 Democratic presidential nominee, NGP VAN warned her campaign that their canvassing software was not prepared to meet the campaign's needs. In the summer of 2024, technical problems with NGP VAN's systems grew so severe that the campaign and the DNC sent full time engineering staff to the company for months to help keep the system operational through the election. Democratic financier Allen Blue funded an emergency operation to allow the system to keep up with the large amounts of data moving through the system.

== Products ==
MiniVAN – A mobile canvassing application that allows for campaigns and organizations to contact voters or supporters, collect data, and sync the information back to their VAN or EveryAction database in real time. 71% of progressive voter contact attempts were made on MiniVAN instead of paper lists in 2018.

VoteBuilder – A web-based service used by the Democratic Party and associated campaigns to track interactions with potential voters. Votebuilder stores information like phone calls and other methods of contact with voters in the system. It is used as part of campaign voter persuasion and "get out the vote" operations. The software was created in 2006 to bridge a perceived gap in microtargeting abilities between the Republican and Democratic parties.

On Wednesday, December 16, 2015, NGP VAN released a code update to their Votebuilder application which contained a bug that allowed two campaigns to see proprietary analytical scores. On the evening of Thursday, December 17 the DNC revoked the Sanders campaign's access to the national voter file, after the campaign accessed and saved data collected by the Clinton campaign. The Sanders campaign sued the DNC in District Court and concurrently fired Josh Uretsky, the staffer who managed three other members of the Sanders campaign who improperly accessed the data. On December 19, the DNC restored the Sanders campaign's access after the campaign agreed to cooperate with their investigation.

NGP – A web-based service for digital engagement, fundraising, and compliance reporting used by most federal Democratic campaigns. NGP is also used by state legislatures and local campaigns. In August 2017, the company released NGP 8, an updated version of the service.

Innovation Platform – A series of APIs and integrations that was rolled out in 2014. Several notable integrations include apps and services such as self-serve online advertising, broadcast and peer-to-peer text messaging tools, live calls, and do-it-yourself direct mail.

Mobilize – A web-based service for event management and volunteer recruitment that connects campaigns with supporters. Mobilize emerged from the 2016 election and grew to become a vital piece of Democratic and progressive tech infrastructure, before being acquired in 2021.

ActionKit — A web-based service for mailing list management, fundraising, and online activism for political campaigns and advocacy organizations. ActionKit grew out of custom software initially developed for MoveOn before being acquired in 2019.
