= Nathaniel Pearlman =

American political consultant

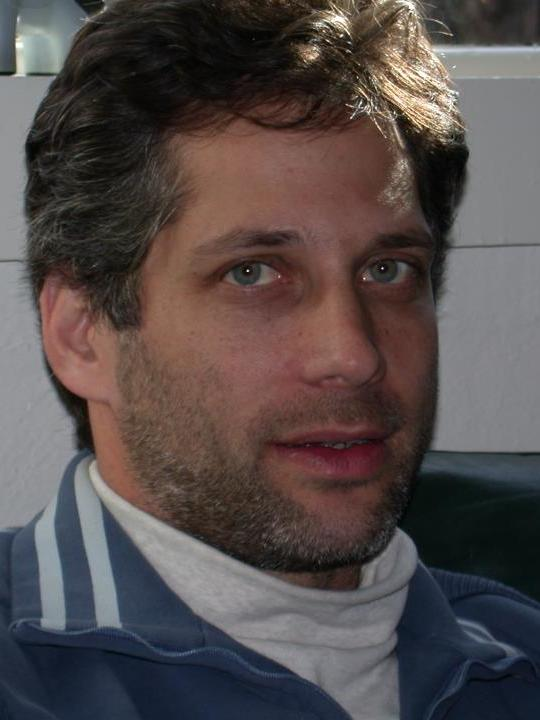
- (2010)
- Born: Nathaniel Goss Pearlman; October 7, 1965 (age 60); Manhattan, New York, USA
- Education: Yale College
- Awards: {see article}
- Website: graphicacy.com

Nathaniel Goss Pearlman (born October 7, 1965, in Manhattan, New York and raised in Boulder, Colorado) is an American political technology and information graphics entrepreneur aligned with the Democratic Party. In 1997, he founded NGP Software, Inc., a company which provides political software to a majority of federal and state level Democrats including most Democratic candidates for President (including Dean, Gephardt, Kerry, Graham, Edwards, Obama, Sanders and Clinton) in 2004, 2008, 2012, and 2016. He was chief technology officer for Hillary Clinton's 2008 presidential campaign and an early practitioner in the area of computers and politics. In 2010, NGP Software merged with the Voter Activation Network to become NGP VAN. Pearlman subsequently founded companies in the information graphics and data visualization space, Timeplots and Graphicacy. He now hosts a podcast called The Great Battlefield about progressive political entrepreneurs and the resistance to Trump.

== Background ==
Nathaniel Goss Pearlman has a degree in Computer Science from Yale (1988). He worked for Election Data Services on legislative redistricting (1991). He attended the doctoral program in Political Science at the Massachusetts Institute of Technology from 1992 to 1996, finishing his exams, but he did not write a dissertation. Instead, he started NGP Software, Inc. in 1997, a fast-growing partisan political software firm. In 2004, Pearlman was named a Rising Star in American Politics by Campaigns and Elections Magazine. In 2008, Pearlman served as Chief Technology Officer for Hillary Clinton's presidential campaign. In 2009, he founded Timeplots, an information graphics product company. In 2012, he founded Graphicacy, a services company that helps enterprises tell complex stories in visual form. In 2014, he cofounded Leverfund, a nonprofit that provides grants to poverty fighting organizations in the DC metro area.

== Publications ==
Margin of Victory: How Technologists Help Politicians Win Elections (New Trends and Ideas in American Politics)

== Personal life ==
Pearlman resides in Washington, DC with his wife Connie KN Chang and their daughters Ella and Lola.
