= Richard Shuttleworth =

Richard Shuttleworth may refer to:

- Richard Shuttleworth (MP for Preston) (1587–1669), English politician who sat in the House of Commons variously between 1640 and 1659
- Richard Shuttleworth (MP for Clitheroe) (died 1648), English politician who sat in the House of Commons between 1640 and 1648
- Richard Shuttleworth (MP for Lancashire) (1683–1749), MP for Lancashire from 1705 to his death
- Richard Ormonde Shuttleworth (1909–1940), racing motorist, aviator and prolific collector of veteran cars and aircraft
