= Shuttlesworth =

Shuttlesworth is a surname. Notable people with the surname include:

- Ed Shuttlesworth (born 1952), former American football fullback
- Fred Shuttlesworth (1922–2011), born Freddie Lee Robinson, was a U.S. civil rights activist as a minister in Birmingham, Alabama

== Fictional characters ==
- Jesus Shuttlesworth, a character in the film He Got Game

== See also ==
- Birmingham-Shuttlesworth International Airport, serves Birmingham, Alabama and Central Alabama, United States
- Shuttlesworth v. Birmingham, 394 U.S. 147 (1969), United States Supreme Court case
- Shuttleworth (disambiguation)
