= Nomenclator (slave) =

Person or book whose purpose is to provide, create, or announce names

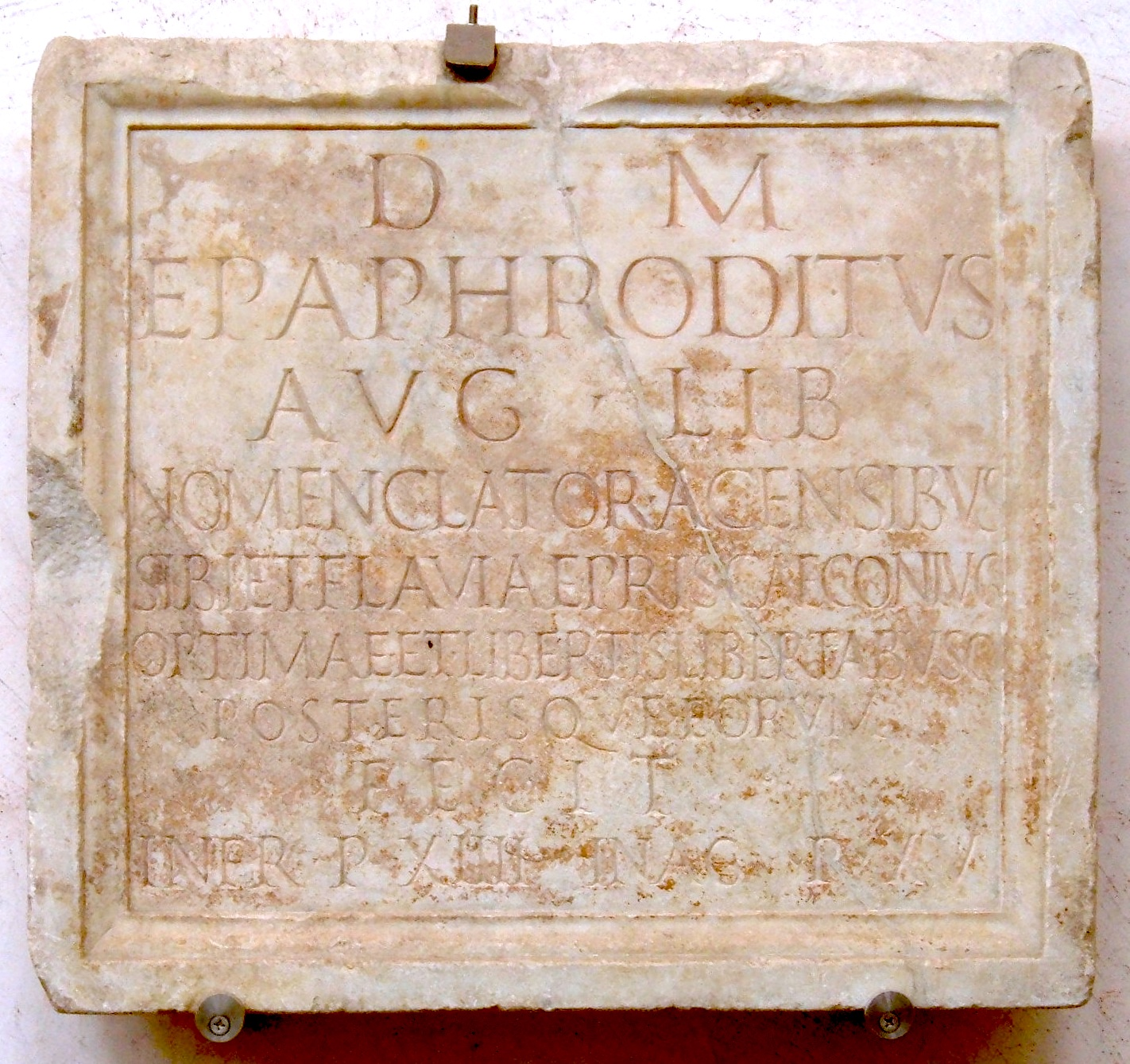
Sepulchral inscription for Epaphroditus, imperial freedman and nomenclator, and his wife Flavia Prisca

A nomenclator (/ˈnoʊmən.kleɪtər/ NOH-mən-KLAY-tər; English plural nomenclators, Latin plural nomenclatores; derived from the Latin nomen- name + calare – to call), in classical times, referred to a slave whose duty was to recall the names of persons his master met during a political campaign. Later, the scope was expanded to include names of people in any social context and also other socially important information about them.

The employ of nomenclatores was common in Roman republican elections from the time of Sulla onwards. Their introduction may have been related to the expansion of the franchise that emerged from the Social War. Their role was especially important when canvassing for votes, since it was important for political candidates to appear to remember all those they had met; indeed it was apparently impressive especially for rural Italians to be addressed by name at Rome. It may have been illegal in the late republic to employ a nomenclator in political campaigns. If actually illegal, the prohibition was widely flouted. The possible illegality aside, use of a nomenclator was still disreputable.

Various ancient texts referenced nomenclatores including: Saturnalia (2.4.15), Historia Augusta (Life of Hadrian 20), Epistulae Morales ad Lucilium (27.5), and Natural History (7.88).

== Bibliography ==
- Drogula, Fred K (2019). Cato the Younger: life and death at the end of the Roman republic. New York: Oxford University Press. ISBN 978-0-19-086902-1. OCLC 1090168108.
- Morstein-Marx, Robert (1998). "Publicity, popularity and patronage in the Commentariolum Petitionis". Classical Antiquity. 17 (2): 259–288. doi:10.2307/25011085. ISSN 0278-6656. JSTOR 25011085.
- Jehne, Martin (2006). "Who attended Roman assemblies? Some remarks on political participation in the Roman republic". Repúblicas y ciudadanos: modelos de participación cívica en el mundo antiguo. pp. 221–34.
