= Voter database =

Information of voters to assist in election campaigns

A voter database is a database containing information on voters for the purpose of assisting a political party or an individual politician, in their Get out the vote (GOTV) efforts and other areas of the campaign.

In most countries, the election agency makes the electoral roll available to all campaigns soon after the election campaign has begun. Campaigns can then merge this information with the other data they have collected on voters over the years to create their database. Often basic information such as phone numbers and postal codes are not included on the voters list, and the campaign will have to procure this data as well.

== Uses ==
The voter database is central to many parts of a campaign:

- Fundraising: The database can determine who should receive fundraising direct mail or telephone calls. These letters and calls can be tailored to reflect the issues and concerns of each potential donor. Past donor history, support for related advocacy groups, magazine subscriptions, and consumer behaviour can all be used to find likely donors and maximize the returns of any fundraising efforts.
- Recruitment: As with fundraising, databases, especially those with detailed past election behaviour, are essential to recruiting volunteers and also finding locations for lawn signs.
- Issue tracking: A campaign can track how certain issues are perceived across geographic and demographic lines and can show how to adjust the campaign's message for different audiences. By databasing all incoming telephone calls and e-mails as well as entering petitions and supporter lists from advocacy groups and NGOs (Non-Government Organizations) one can closely track how issues are followed by the electorate.
- Get out the vote: One of the most important parts of a modern campaign is the campaign to ensure one's own supporters go to the polls on election day, and databases are central to this. A successful voter identification campaign requires connecting with a significant portion of the electorate and recording how they are going to vote in a database. On election day this information needs to be given out with accurate contact information for each voter so that they can be pulled to the polls.

== Voter information ==
Personal data frequently included in a voter database:

- Name
- Physical address
- Mailing address
- Phone number
- Party membership or affiliation
- Voting history (including federal, sub-national, primary, municipal, or special election voting history)
- Absentee or military voter designations
- Source of voter registration, e.g. DMV/MVA, Public Assistance Office, etc.
- Ethnicity or emerges race hypothesis
- Gender
- Birth date or age range

Data that may be added from commercial sources:

- "Extreme voters" status (voters who vote very frequently)
- Homeownership
- Hunting or fishing license holders
- Boat owners
- Concealed Weapon Permit Holders
- Occupation such as physical therapist, teacher, etc.
- Charitable or political contributions
- Magazine subscription status

== Voter database management software ==
The use of voter databases has been established in political campaigns at all levels from local to national elections:

=== In the United States ===
The United States does not have a federal election agency, and thus has no official national voter list. In 2002, the United States Congress passed the Help America Vote Act (HAVA). HAVA required that each state compile an official state voter database by January 2006. Most states complied with HAVA by gathering the voter files available from each individual county. States decided what information to include, what restrictions to place on the use of their voter database, and how much the database would cost. In the United States, several companies have merged state voter information with commercially obtained data to create comprehensive voter databases that include a plethora of personal details on each voter. These companies often provide United States Voter Files to statutorily permitted or otherwise non-restricted users.

In the 2004 presidential election in the United States, the Republican Party used the Voter Vault platform and the Democratic Party used DataMart. Currently, the Republicans use rVotes Data Center and the Democrats use Votebuilder from the Voter Activation Network (VAN). There are non-partisan firms that offer registered voter data in the United States, too: NationBuilder, Aristotle, eMerges and Labels and Lists.

In 2015, a database of 191 million U.S. voters was exposed on the internet and included names, addresses, birth dates, party affiliations, phone numbers and emails of voters in all 50 U.S. states and Washington.

Since 2025, the United States federal government has attempted to create a national citizenship database that functions as a national voter database.

=== In the United Kingdom ===
Since the beginning of 2015 the British Conservative Party has used an online database called Votesource which is a centrally held database that local activists administer. The database merges both the membership database and the electoral roll and the centralised nature of it means the party can build demographic models based on Mosaic in to it to identify voters who are more likely to support the party at an election. The system is not without criticism and faced particular problems during the 2015 General Election and the primary to select the Conservative candidate for 2016 London Mayoral Election. A similar system with a similar Mosaic-based demographic model was used by Britain Stronger in Europe during the 2016 EU referendum.

From 2009 to the end of 2014 the Conservative Party used a system called MERLIN (Managing Elector Relationships through Local Information Networks) which was a national database accessible by every local Conservative Association in the country. This was commissioned in 2005, and went live in 2008.

From the mid-1990s to 2009 the Conservative Party used a programme called BlueChip which was a programme held on individual Conservative Association computers. BlueChip was not a nationally centralised database and it relied entirely on local activists maintaining it and updating it. For the 2005 General Election the party incorporated a national model called Voter Vault into the BlueChip system for the first time to direct canvassers towards voters based on demographics.

Britain's Labour Party has used a variety of voter databases through the past two decades. Its most recent incarnation is the Labour Contact Creator system, an online tool accessible from anywhere with an internet connection. Party members and activists are provided with a username and password and voter contact details, preferences, interests, past voting behaviour, and demographic/socio-economic information are available. The system allows voters to be selected on the basis of a MOSAIC grouping, which attempts to determine the sort of interests and activities a voter or a household might display. Maps of where key voters live and information can be cross-referenced so users can find where target voters live, how often they are contacted, how they prefer to be contacted, and what responses have been provided upon making contact.

The Contact Creator system is also linked with the Labour Party's other new media tools, Print Creator and Email Creator. Print Creator allows key voters identified through Contact Creator to be targeted with direct mails and leaflets about Labour Party activity. Email Creator allows the user to collect a list of email addresses on the Contact Creator system, e-mail thousands of voters, and monitor the response rate from targets.

The Labour Party also operates 'Membersnet', which allows party members to update their registration details, inform other members and Party HQ of rival campaign activities, create events and invite others to attend, email members, create blogs, and share best practice campaign material.

The Labour Party introduced a new system to Membersnet and Contact Creator in 2013, focusing on a new user-friendly interface, which allows Party Members anywhere in the UK to contact target voters and identify their voting preferences. They will then be able to enter the information gained directly into the Contact Creator system.

In late 2011 Liberal Democrats began to adopt the use of a variant of NGP VAN's Voter Activation Network (VAN) software named "Connect".

In 2016 Vote Leave built a bespoke database called VICS (Voting Intention Collection System) which was an online database that local activists used for canvassing and Get Out the Vote operations. The VICS system was the first of its kind to incorporate a geographic street-based reactive demographic model which directed activists towards streets likely to support leaving the European Union. As canvass returns were entered into VICS the model reacted to adjust which streets were priorities so it became more accurate based on actual canvass returns rather than relying solely on demographic modelling. The VICS system was widely credited with the success of Vote Leave's campaign.

=== In Canada ===
In Canada, the Conservative Party of Canada developed their in-house software C-VOTE database, which replaced their previous system Constituent Information Management System (CIMS). After major flaws arose in 2013 over C-VOTE (including not being able to identify undecided voters), the Conservative Party switched back to CIMS for the 2015 election. CIMS was originally developed by the same company which produced Trackright, which the Progressive Conservative Party of Ontario, used to manage voter information prior to the 2011 election, before switching to CIMS as well. It is similar to the Voter Vault software. The New Democratic Party uses their own custom database system called Populus. Previously the NDP used a system called NDP Vote. The Liberal Party has recently introduced "Liberalist" based on the US's Democrats' Voter Activation Network (VAN) Previously the Liberals used a system called ManagElect.

=== Availability ===
The availability of voter files sometimes creates a need for voter list management software as opposed to, for example, using Excel spreadsheets. Political campaigns generally have three options:

- Write-their-own software: A political campaign may choose to build their own database management system to handle their voter registration files. This may be accomplished in a spreadsheet program like Microsoft Excel. This method can be time-consuming and require a certain level of technology know-how, but may be the only option for certain campaigns.
- Desktop-based software: A variety of companies provide voter list management software for a desktop or laptop computer. Generally, this type of software is distributed on a per-computer basis and can therefore be expensive for larger campaigns. However, desktop-based software is easier to use than create-your-own and can provide many integrated, helpful solutions for political campaigns such as walking list generation, computer-based phone banking, and more.
- Internet-based software: Many companies provide online voter list management software. Internet-based software has many of the same benefits of desktop-based software, and has the additional advantage of being accessible from any computer (Windows, Mac, or Linux) with an Internet connection. Internet-based software helps campaigns eliminate the need for large campaign offices with central computer and phone banks.
