= Personalized audio message =

A personalized audio message is a compiled, personalized voice message that individually addresses the recipient by name. These voice messages can be delivered through a myriad of channels, the most popular of which include phone transmission, email, web, and social media sites such as Facebook. Traditionally these messages are recorded by recognizable figures or people of notoriety to enhance the impact the message has on its audience. Because of demanding schedules, automated computer systems are generally used to help compile separate recordings by the recorder, to reduce recording times.

== Notable examples ==
Several personalized audio messages have gone viral in recent years. One of them is 'Send a call from Santa' that lets kids and parents fill out a web form and have Santa personally call them for free with information specific to their interests. Politicians have also used personalized audio messages to connect with prospective voters. In 2008 Meg Whitman sent out personalized robo calls to remind her constituents to go out and vote on election day. Mitt Romney also gained national attention in early 2012 when North Carolina voters received personalized phone messages asking them for support in the primaries. Romney used the same technology in 2008 to deliver similar messages, and the technology has been widely used by a variety of politicians at all levels since 2004.

== Personalization ==
Personalization technology enables the dynamic insertion, customization or suggestion of content in any format that is relevant to the individual user, based on the user's implicit behavior and preferences, and explicitly given details. The use of personalization on marketing materials or campaigns can increase response rates by an average of 36%. Personalized audio messaging is a marketing strategy involving the delivery of personalized audio segments to a targeted audience in the hopes of increasing response rates. Several commercial vendors have evolved and offer technology platforms to automate the process, the most well known include PersoniCom, Votilogy, Sound Messaging Inc., Trisynergy Media, and desktop editing tool Audacity.

=== In practice ===
The United States of America had a population of 313,847,465 as of 2012. However, despite having such a large population with diverse backgrounds the distribution of first names in America is relatively homogeneous. Just 60 first names comprise over 50% of all men within the United States.

| Number of unique names (men & women): | Percentage of population: |
|---|---|
| 38 | 25% |
| 60 | 33% |
| 139 | 50% |
| 524 | 75% |

To create a personalized audio message, individual audio segments must be recorded and later reassembled to create one complete, cohesive message. Common first names are first identified and then recorded in succession. These audio segments are then merged with a message greeting and body that addresses a particular topic. The final result is one fluid message that recipients can download, access, or receive for listening purposes. By recording segments individually, recording times can be significantly reduced.

== Current use ==
Because of the uniqueness of personalized audio messaging, several major industries have adopted this technology as a standard marketing practice. Political figures in particular have begun heavily leveraging this technology to connect with their constituents and gauge voter interest on key topics. Personalized audio messaging is also being heavily used in fundraising activities for the 2012 political season. Other industries have also deployed personal audio technology to drive audience engagement including professional sports teams, associations, college admissions departments, corporate executive teams, and entertainment companies.
