= Get out the vote =

Efforts aimed at increasing the voter turnout in elections

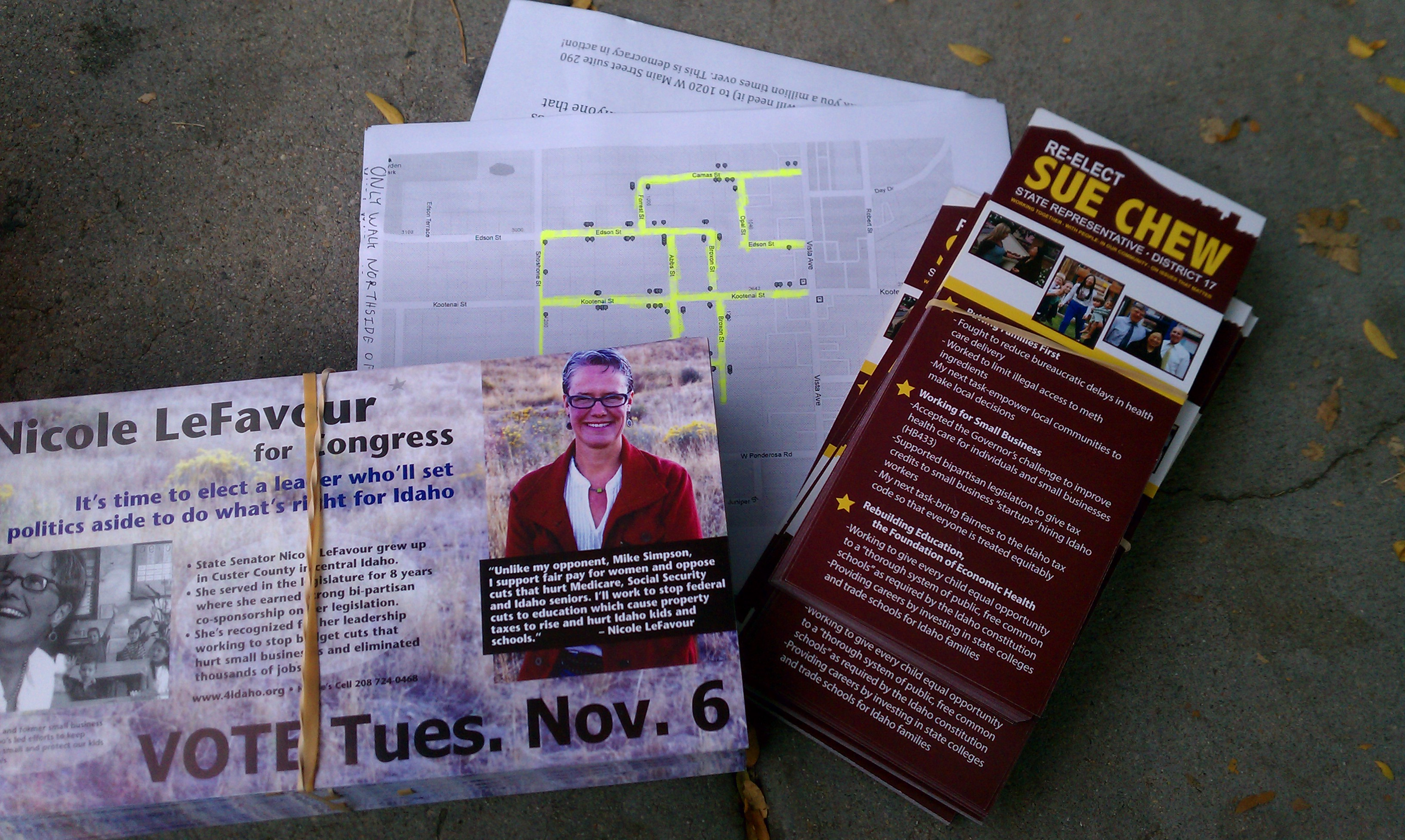
Typical canvassing material for GOTV in the United States

"Get out the vote" or "getting out the vote" (GOTV) describes efforts aimed at increasing the voter turnout in elections. In countries that do not have or enforce compulsory voting, voter turnout can be low, sometimes even below a third of the eligible voter pool. GOTV efforts typically attempt to register voters, then get them to vote, by absentee ballot, early voting or election day voting. GOTV is generally not required for elections when there are effective compulsory voting systems in place, other than perhaps to register first time voters.

There are two types of GOTV efforts. The first type is general voter registration campaigns and encouragement to vote, conducted by electoral authorities or nonpartisan organizations. The second type is partisan work targeted at potential voters who are likely to vote a particular way. For partisans it may be easier and more cost effective to encourage voting by a hundred supporters who did not vote in the past, than it is to convince fifty voters to switch support from one party to the other. This situation can lead to polarized electoral politics. A 70% turnout from a party's committed base can be better than a 50 percent turnout from both committed and marginal supporters.

== Campaign contexts ==
In contexts of the efforts of candidates, party activities and ballot measure campaigns, "get-out-the-vote" or "GOTV" is an adjective indicating having the effect of increasing the number of the campaign's supporters who will vote in the immediately approaching election. Typically, GOTV is a distinct phase of the overall campaign. Tactics used during GOTV often include: telephoning or sending personalized audio messages to known supporters on the days leading up to an election (or on election day itself), providing transport to and from polling stations for supporters, and canvassing known supporters. Canvassing for the purpose of voter registration usually ceases when GOTV begins. Other activities include literature drops early on election day or the evening before and an active tracking of eligible voters who have already voted. GOTV can also be important in high turn-out elections when the margin of victory is expected to be close.

== Voter turnout organizations ==
In many countries, the task of electoral authorities includes the promotion of and assisting in the registration of potential voters, and in the exercise of the right to vote; However, such efforts are not uniformly successful, and at times are partisan. A number of voter turnout organizations have formed in an effort to "get out the vote". In the United States, such voter turnout organizations include the League of Women Voters, Postcards To Voters, Rock the Vote, The Voter Participation Center and Vote.org, as well as nonpartisan campaign technology platforms such as FullPAC (operating via GOTV.com), which attempt to motivate voters in targeted demographics to register and to vote.

During the 2016 Georgian parliamentary election, President of Georgia Giorgi Margvelashvili supported an unprecedented "get out the vote" campaign in Georgian history in terms of the scale of coverage, feedbacks, and results, a nation-wide campaign initiated by the Europe-Georgia Institute to increase involvement of youth in the elections.

Shortly before the elections the Europe-Georgia Institute started the "Your Voice, Our Future" (YVOF Campaign) in the village of Bazaleti. President Margvelashvili and George Melashvili, the head of the Europe-Georgia Institute addressed participants. Shortly after summer schools on civic engagement, political culture and "Get out the vote" campaigns were held in 10 different regions of Georgia. participants visited 20 cities and towns and held meetings with locals, describing and explaining the importance of voting. Young people planned creative activities such as flash mobs, plays, theatre sketches and attracted media attention.

The effort of these organizations is in getting people to vote and not to promote particular candidates or political view, and a group is nonpartisan if it is not directing people how to vote. Nonpartisan groups generally do not distribute literature about candidates or causes when assisting potential voters to register to vote, and also do not focus GOTV efforts on voters who are most likely to agree with their personal views.

== Reading system ==
The traditional GOTV method used in the UK is the Reading system, developed by the Reading Constituency Labour Party and its MP Ian Mikardo for the 1945 general election. Once canvassing was performed to identify likely Labour voters, these were compiled onto 'Reading pads' or 'Mikardo sheets' featuring the names and addresses of supporters and pasted onto a large table or plank of wood. On election day these lists, with identical copies underneath, were torn off and given to GOTV campaigners. Lists of this type are sometimes referred to as Shuttleworths.

At each polling station, tellers for each party will collect the unique poll numbers of voters from their polling cards. These numbers are regularly collected from the polling stations and collated in a campaign headquarters for each ward, often referred to in the UK as a committee room. 'Promised voters' who have already voted are then crossed off the list of voters canvassed as supporting Labour. This enables campaigners to then focus more efficiently on the remainder of their supporters who have not voted. Computerisation has heralded further increases in efficiency, but nearly all subsequent methodologies can be traced back in some form to the Reading system.

== Negative campaigning and voter suppression ==
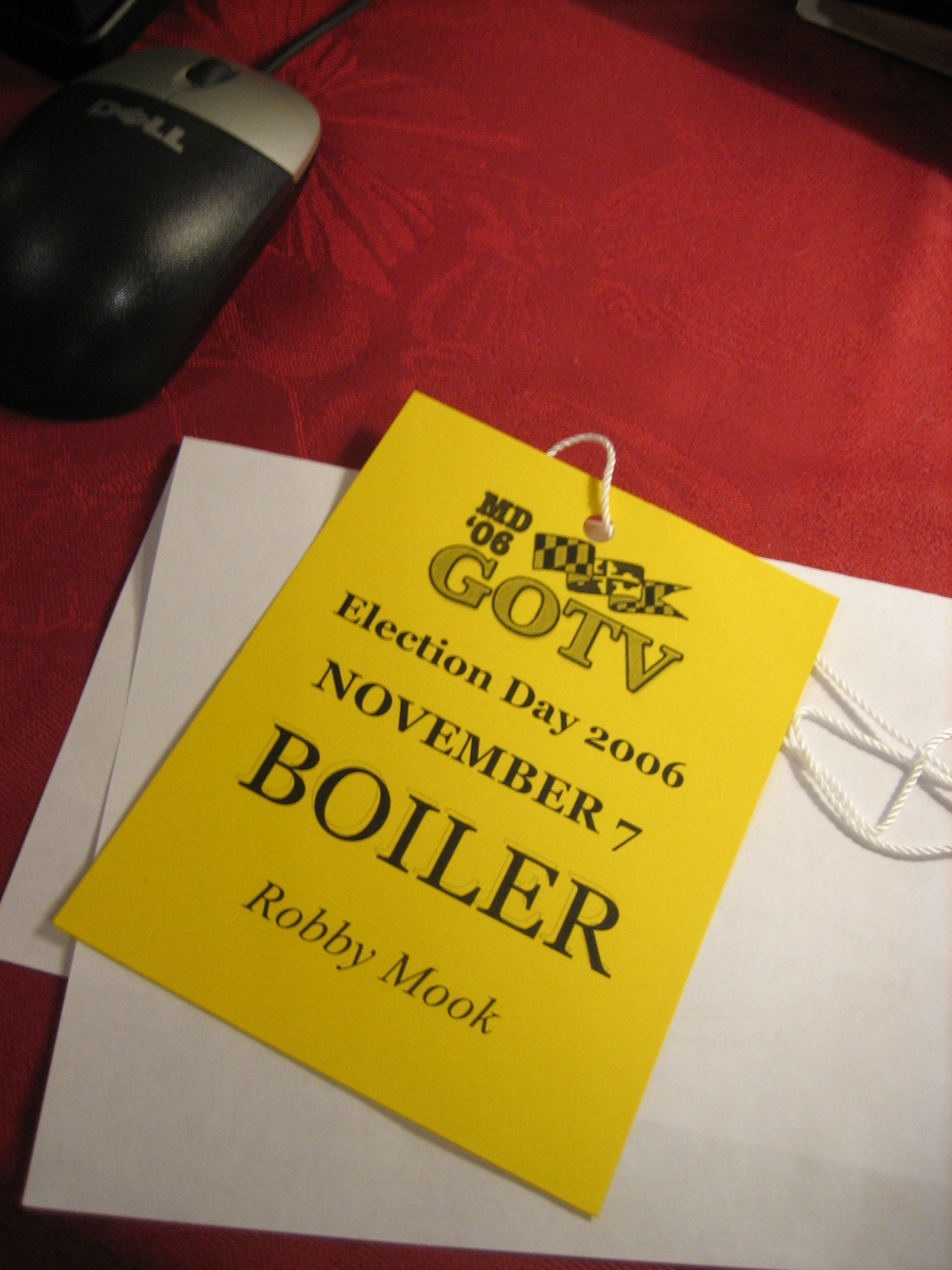
Robby Mook get out the vote leaflet for the Maryland gubernatorial election

The terminology reflects a distinction of GOTV from the complementary strategy of suppressing turnout among likely opposition voters. Political consultants are reputed to privately advise some candidates to "go negative" (attack an opponent), without any intent to sway voters toward them: this plan is to instead increase the number of eligible voters who fail to vote, because their tendency to believe "politics is inherently corrupt" has so recently been reinforced. Such turnout suppression can be advantageous where any combination of three conditions apply:

1. The negative campaigning is targeted (by direct mail, telephone "push polls", or the like) on likely opposing voters, reducing the collateral damage to supporters' morale.
2. The side going negative has an advantage in its supporters being steadier voters than those of its opponent.
3. The side going negative has an advantage in doing effective GOTV, so that its campaign workers can get a GOTV "antidote" to more supporters "poisoned" by the negative campaign, than the opposing campaign can of their own supporters.

== Get out the vote in practice ==
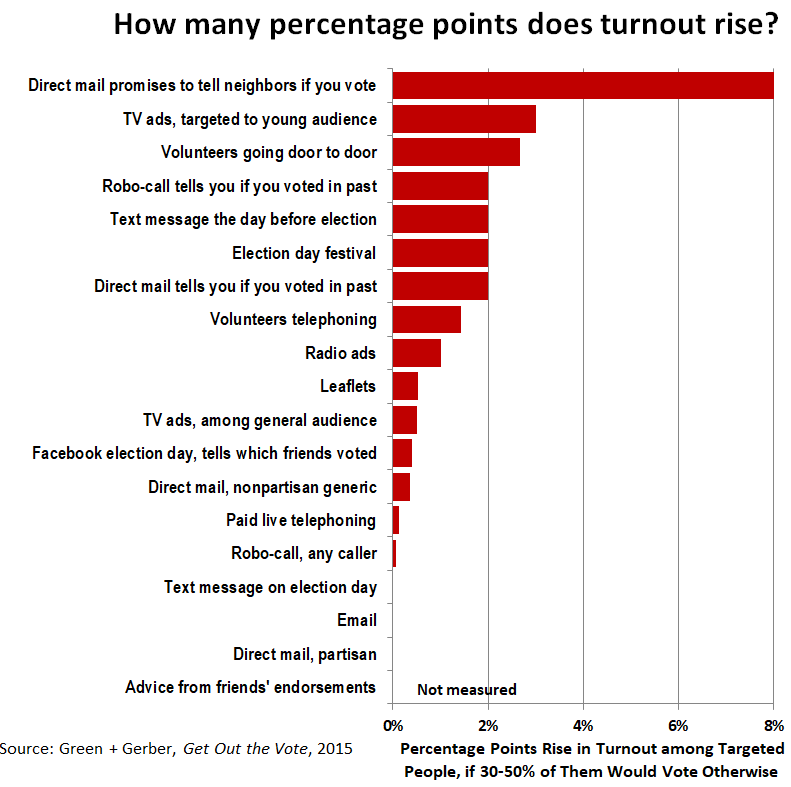
Methods of raising turnout

Political scientists have conducted hundreds of field experiments to learn which get out the vote tactics are effective, when, and on which types of voters. This research has revolutionized how campaigns conceive of their get out the vote efforts. Research also shows that voting is habit-forming, as voting in one election increases the probability of voting in a future election by 10 percentage points (controlling for other factors).

The value of GOTV is unclear, but a well-organized effort can gain a candidate as much as nine percentage points in campaigns in the United States. In terms of mobilization, studies have found that door-to-door canvassing increases turnout among the contacted households with approximately 4.3 percentage points, according to experts Alan Gerber and Gregory Huber in 2016 while a 2013 study of 71 canvasses including many that targeted low propensity voters found turnout increased by 2–3 percentage points. Even earlier, analysts had often concluded that personal canvassing produced far higher voter turnout rates, such as 9.8–12.8%. While most experiments have been conducted in the US, recent studies have found similar or somewhat smaller effects in Europe.

The guide to grassroots elections Get Out the Vote determined that GOTV efforts averaged one vote every 15 door knocks by volunteers ($31 per vote), 35 phone calls by volunteers ($35 per vote), or 273 pieces of nonpartisan direct mail ($91 per vote, no effect from partisan direct mail). They note that campaigns which experiment carefully can do better than these averages. Campaigns can raise turnout up to 8 percentage points with direct mail which tells neighbors when other neighbors have voted and promises to mail an update after the election, though people complain when they have no way to opt in or out of notification.

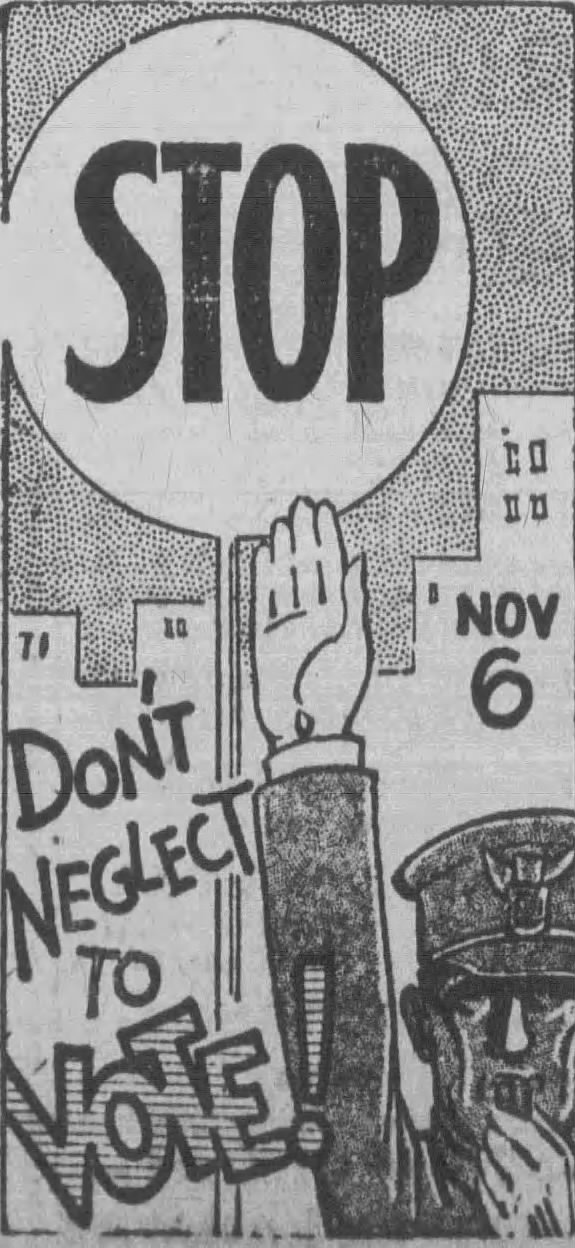
Get out the vote ad for the 1928 United States presidential election

Other studies have found that GOTV methods contribute little to none to voter turnout. One field experiment found that GOTV phone calls were largely ineffective, and that ease of access to polling locations had the largest impact on voter turnout. There is also the argument that GOTV targets a more affluent demographic, which is already more likely to vote. Less politically engaged demographic and socioeconomic groups are sometimes neglected in GOTV efforts.

GOTV is often most effective when potential voters are told to do so "because others will ask". Voters will then go to the polls as a means of fulfilling perceived societal expectations. Paradoxically, informing voters that turnout is expecting to be high was found to increase actual voter turnout, while predicting lower turnouts actually resulted in less voters. In 2004, Rock the Vote paid to run TV ads aimed at young voters, on a random sample of small cable systems where they could measure the effects. Turnout was three percentage points higher among 18- to 19-year-olds in these sample areas than in the control group covered by other similar small cable systems; there was less effect above age 22.

In November 2012 and 2013, Rock the Vote experimented with Facebook ads to encourage voter turnout by telling people the number of days remaining until the election and which of their friends "liked" the countdown. The ads were shown to over 400,000 adults, randomly selected from a base over 800,000. Rock the Vote had helped many of them register. The ads did not increase turnout in the experimental group, compared to the control group who did not get the ads. In 2012 they also experimented with text message reminders to 180,000 people who had provided their mobile numbers. Texts the day before the election raised turnout six tenths of a percentage point, while texts on election day lowered turnout.

Several mobile apps tell people where to vote, identify their elected officials, or search candidates' positions, though no evidence measures how much these raise turnout. Facebook apps let users see who their friends endorse, which gives them a shortcut in deciding whom to vote for. Studies in 2012 and 2017 found that Facebook's "I'm Voting/I'm a Voter" button increased turnout in the 2010 Congressional elections by six tenths of a percentage point, and in the 2012 presidential election by a quarter of a percentage point. It named their friends who had clicked the voting button, thus opting in and minimizing complaints. However the button only appeared on election day, so it did not let friends track and encourage each other throughout the early voting period which most states have. It has been used in many elections throughout the world since then, without clarity on which users see it, leading to concerns on how it biases turnout. Groups such as Postcards To Voters send handwritten postcards to potential voters ahead of elections in hopes of increasing turnout. A 2007 study showed that handwritten notes were three times as effective as machine-printed ones.

== Effects of the COVID-19 pandemic ==
The COVID-19 pandemic had a huge effect on the campaigning approach for future government candidates. The use of digital and virtual campaigning approaches became much more common. During the pandemic, Virtual town halls and video conferences became a central way to engage voters. Additionally, social media platforms such as X, Instagram, and TikTok were used more in efforts for voter engagement particularly in the youth voting category. In fact, due to this social media outreach, about 50 percent of youth voters (18-29) voted in 2020. becoming one of the highest youth voting rates since the voting minimum age got lowered to 18. These reactions and approaches to a national quarantine are still lasting today as almost all presidential candidates of the 2024 election all had TikTok accounts that were heavily active.

== See also ==
- Election campaigns
- Issue advocacy ads
- List of democracy and elections-related topics
