= Election litter =

Unlawful political advertising

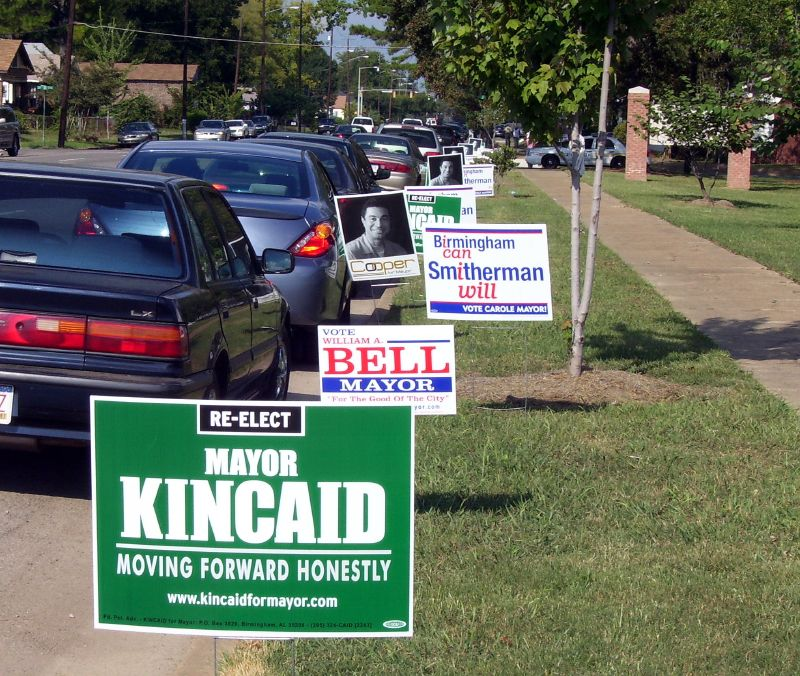
Yard signs such as these are frequently neglected after an election.

Election litter is the unlawful erection of political advertising on private residences or property owned by the local government. Often, election signs may only be displayed on private property with permission for a certain time within the election, and may not exceed a certain size. When placed on public property or public rights of way without permission, or if left on private property for too long, they are often in violation of littering laws or laws intended to prevent flyposting.

== Banning election litter ==
Election litter usually is defined as placing campaign signs on public, government-owned property, or on privately owned property (including residences) without the owner's permission. It is usually banned by local government.

According to the "State Board of Elections littering notification" statute of the U.S. state of North Carolina:

[...] the State Board of Elections shall notify the candidate of the provisions concerning campaign signs in G.S. 136‑32 and G.S. 14‑156, and the rules adopted by the Department of Transportation pursuant to G.S. 136‑18. (2001‑512, s. 7.)

Similarly, Chapter 23.04 of the San Jose (California) Municipal Code (adopted in August 2001) forbids the use of "election signs" on government-owned property, and only allows their use on private property with the permission of the owner of that property, and in residential areas with further restrictions. Setting up signs, and later removing them, is the responsibility of anyone who "undertakes an election campaign".

The "Litter Pollution Act" of County Kerry, Ireland, restricted the deposition of materials in public places, so as to create litter. It was enforced in cleaning up election litter in 2002. Violation of the Act is a summary offence.

=== Limits on election signs ===
While almost all laws about election litter restrict its placement on tax-funded public property and private property without permission, there are also special time limits imposed. For example, election signs in San Jose, California, are allowed no more than 10 days after election; San Bruno, California, 14 days; Tucson, Arizona, 15 days; County Kerry (Ireland), 7 days after election.

In addition, regulation can be placed on the size of election signs. For example, Saint Paul, Minnesota, places an area limit of 16 square feet (1.5 m^{2}). Tucson disallows the height of election signs to exceed 10 feet (3.0 m) in all districts, an area of 6 square feet (0.56 m^{2}) in non-residential districts, and an area of 50 square feet (4.6 m^{2}) in other districts.

== Cleanup of election litter ==
An excessive number of campaign signs is often considered a problem.

The elimination of election litter was supported in Makati in the Philippines. Organized by the DES (Department of Environmental Services), it was approximated that at least 95% of "leaflets, posters, streamers and billboards" were cleared, in according with an ordinance "prohibiting the defacement of walls and public spaces". In Taipei, Taiwan, the removal of election litter was ordered to give residents "a clean city".

== Litter in the courts ==
In 1984, the United States Supreme Court held that although political signs are protected under the First Amendment the state may enact and enforce content-neutral laws to limit their "visual assault on the citizens".

The problem addressed by this ordinance -- the visual assault on the citizens of Los Angeles presented by an accumulation of signs posted on public property -- constitutes a significant substantive evil within the City's power to prohibit. "[The] city's interest in attempting to preserve [or improve] the quality of urban life is one that must be accorded high respect.

Later that decade the Fourth circuit court of appeal held in Major Media of the Southeast v. City of Raleigh 1987 that ". . . no empirical studies are necessary for reasonable people to conclude that billboards pose a traffic hazard, since by their very nature they are designed to distract drivers and their passengers from maintaining their view of the road."

Similarly the California Supreme Court held in Metromedia v. San Diego that ". . . as a matter of law that an ordinance which eliminates billboards designed to be viewed from streets and highways reasonably relates to traffic safety."

== Legal election signs ==
Some places allow election signs to be posted on public property, subject to certain restrictions. For example, in the United States, California's Department of Transportation allows "temporary political signs" in the lead up to an election, subject to certain requirements such as picking up the signs within a certain timeframe, size, and filing a statement of responsibility.

== See also ==
- Flyposting
- Littering
