= Assumed Incumbency =

The strategy of assumed incumbency is based on a recognition of the value of incumbency in a political campaign. A high correlation between election and incumbency has been demonstrated in congressional races. The success rate of incumbent members of the U.S. House of Representatives seeking re-election averaged 93.5 percent during the 1960s and 1970s. Statistically, the initial edge for the incumbent candidate is 2-4 percent of the vote.

An incumbent is the person currently holding the office; that held position provides an automatic legitimacy, which usually results in an early conclusion of the person being the frontrunner in the campaign. Powell and Shelby (1891) claim that being the frontrunner allows the candidate to be able to define the parameters of debate and put the burden of the proof on the challenger.

The assumed incumbent strategy occurs when a political position becomes open with no incumbent seeking re-election. The candidate that runs for the now open spot can assume the incumbency role for that position, usually through same-party affiliation. One case study that examined an assumed incumbency looked at Richard Shelby and his congressional campaign in 1978 in Alabama. At the time, Shelby was an Alabama state senator, and had announced his intentions to run for the state lieutenant governor's position However, when Congressman Walter Flowers decided to leave his seat in the U.S. House of Representatives and run for a seat in the U.S. Senate, Shelby decided to abandon his campaign for state lieutenant governor and run for Walter's congressional seat. The congressional seat was now open with no incumbent seeking re-election. Thus, the decision for Shelby to run was made using the assumed incumbency strategy.

The strategy of assumed incumbency is developed through three progressive stages that complete a model of spiral progression as follows:

Stage	Rhetorical Stance/Technique	Goal
Legitimacy	Identification	Reinforcement
Logical Choice	Increased Visibility	Fulfillment of competency expectations
Perception as frontrunner, Generation of competency expectations	Increased name recognition, Expanding competency expectations to larger audience	Reinforcement

The three stages of the model are as follows:

1. Legitimacy becomes the rhetorical goal of the strategy, and the initial stage of the strategy's development. This starting point depends on the degree of name recognition that a candidate has with its given audience. The goal is to generate expectations about the candidate as the likely winner, which is achieved through the rhetorical stance that identifies the candidate as the 'natural choice' for the position sought. Success comes from identification of the candidate with the incumbent and/or the characteristics of the incumbency.

2. Identification stems from the increased visibility that is given to the candidate during the legitimacy stage, making the candidate a political celebrity. The goal of this stage is increased voter recognition of a candidate's name. Press coverage shifts from trying to establish legitimacy to maintaining one's name in the face of the public.

3. Reinforcement occurs when the candidate's campaign reaffirms the legitimacy of the candidate. If the stages of legitimacy and identification succeed, then a set of expectations will be generated on what the candidate should be like - the 'ideal candidate' image that the voters begin to form and hold

The assumed incumbency model seeks to generate a specific ideal type in the early stage, then provide verification in the final stage.

Assumptions of the Model

1. The importance of legitimacy as a campaign stage is noted.

2. The strategy assumes that direct confrontation between the candidate and the opposition should not occur, as the confrontation would assign legitimacy to the opponent and reduce the effectiveness of the strategy.

3. The strategy assumes that past voting behavior related to the actual incumbent can serve as the basis for establishing vote expectations for the new candidate.

4. The strategy assumes a progressive acceleration rate, attained by increased media exposure, which is intended to assist in the control of momentum so the candidate is perceived as starting from a strong position and growing stronger as the campaign develops.

5. The strategy dictates what media should be employed and at what times to achieve the effects.

One contingent condition must exist: the strategy is contingent upon the actual incumbent having strong voting appeal in the district. If the strong vote appeal is not present, the advantage of assuming incumbency would be diminished. This strategy worked for Shelby, as there was a strong vote appeal present for the actual incumbent; in this case, Walters. Pre-campaign polls showed that Flowers was the most popular politician with a favorability rating of 67%
