= Placard =

Notice installed in a public place

A placard is a notice installed in a public place, like a small card, sign, or plaque. It can be attached to or hung from a vehicle or building to indicate information about the vehicle operator or contents of a vehicle or building. It can also refer to paperboard signs or notice carried by picketers or demonstrators. Placards are used on buildings to communicate information such as the location of fallout shelters, fire safety policies, and hazards to firefighters.

== Buildings ==
A placard is posted on buildings to communicate a wide variety of information, such as fire safety policies, emergency shelters.

The International Building Code requires doors in some public and commercial structures, fitted with an internal key lock have a notice "This door to remain unlocked when this space is occupied" in a minimum of 1 inch (25 mm) text be posted beside or above the door. Some state and local building codes modify this text, such as California fire code, which specifies "This door to remain unlocked during business hours".

Temporary placards may be placed on buildings such as warning signs when a structure is being fumigated, or has been condemned by building inspectors or the fire department and is unsafe to enter.

=== Fallout shelters ===
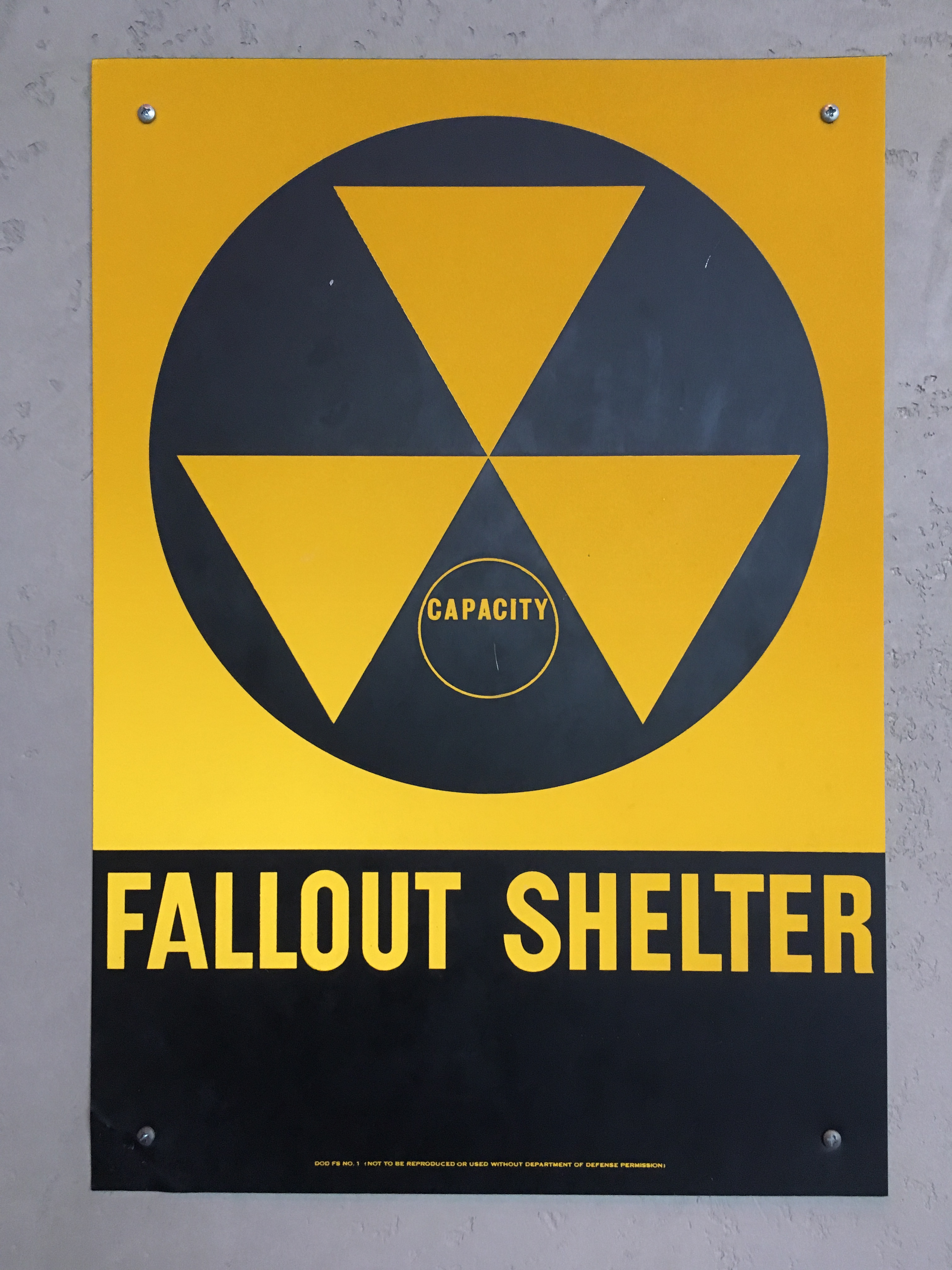
A fallout shelter sign

As part of the civil defense preparations in the event of a nuclear attack, in 1961 United States began establishing fallout shelters in communities across the country. The shelters were symbolized by orange-yellow and black trefoil symbol, designed by Robert W. Blakeley.

In 1962, 1.4 million metal signs and 1 million adhesive stickers were manufactured and distributed across the country at a total cost of $700,500 equivalent to $7,455,817 in 2025. Two standard signs were used widely, a 14 by 20 inches (360 by 510 mm) aluminum sign for posting on the exterior of buildings identifying the building as having a fallout shelter, and a 10 by 14 inches (250 by 360 mm) steel sign, intended for interior use to the shelter's location and mark the actual location of the shelter within the building.

The sign system included "overlays" that were designed to be added to signs for conveying additional information about the specific shelter and its location.

Exterior sign overlays:

- Numbers - for Capacity marking
- Arrows
- In Basement
- Refugio - (Spanish speaking areas)
- Refugio Contra Radiacion - (Spanish speaking areas)
- Lafiga Mai Pefuatomika - (American Samoa)
- Aofai E Ofi - (American Samoa)
- Miles
- Blocks
- Numbers for "Miles" & "Blocks"

Interior sign overlays:

- Starts Here - With arrows
- Capacity - with numbers
- Comienzo - with arrows (Spanish speaking areas)
- Amata Iinei - with arrows (American Samoa)
- In This Corridor
- On
- Floors
- Numbers for the "Floors"

Alternate languages overlays in Spanish in areas where it was widely spoken and Samoan for use on American Samoa.

Following the ending of funding for fallout shelters in the late 1970s. Following the end of the program there was no organized effort by the federal government reclaim shelter supplies and signage, resulting in most shelters being abandoned in situ until building owners cleared away the shelter's supplies and signage during subsequent renovations or demolition projects. In 2017, New York City announced a formal project to go through all city-owned structures and remove any remaining fallout shelter signage, citing the fact no structure still had a functioning shelter and would not be usable in an emergency.

=== Firefighting markings ===
Numerous markings have been developed to better aid firefighters and other first responders to warn of hazards from hazardous materials, location of utility shut-offs, fire alarm and sprinkler control panels, construction and condition of the building.

==== Fire sprinkler systems ====
The International Code Council's International Building Code requires that all fire standpipe and fire sprinkler connections must be visible from the roadway or fire department access in new construction. On existing buildings, where the connection is not visible from these places, it must clearly marked with a red and white sign, with "FDC", short for "Fire Department Connection", in 6 inches (150 mm) letters, with any other lettering or arrows being 2 inches (51 mm) tall. Signs must also state what is fed by the connection. If a connection does not cover an entire building, such a connection feeding fire sprinklers that are only in a new addition, the area covered must be stated on the sign.

If a fire alarm system does not automatically call the fire department, a "When Alarm Sounds - Call Fire Department" sign must be posted at all fire alarm pull station/call points and at any external fire alarm notification appliances.

==== NFPA 704 ====
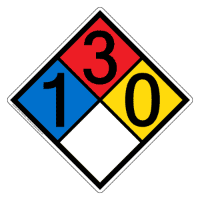
A NFPA 704 symbol for acetone.

NFPA 704 is a standard developed by the National Fire Protection Association for warning first responders to hazards posed by hazardous materials stored in a building or facility. The signs are intended to be mounted on the exteriors of buildings, storage tanks and storage areas.

The square is divided into four sections, color coded: Red - flammability; blue - health hazard; yellow - reactivity/instability; White - special hazard, such as oxidizers, water reactive or Asphyxiating gas.

The red, yellow and blue sections are labeled on scale of 0 to 4; 0 "minimal hazard" to 4, "severe hazard". White (special hazard) is represented by letter codes ("OX","SA", a "W" with a line through it).

==== NFPA 170 ====
Introduced in 1991, NFPA 170 combined 4 existing standards, 171, 172, 174 and 178 into a single standard NFPA 170 - Fire Safety and Emergency Symbols. The standard contains symbols for use in buildings to locate exits, firefighting equipment and enforce fire safety rules, in addition to symbols for building blueprints, diagrams and firefighting operation maps.

The standard utilizes the ISO's "running man" symbol for exit signage, similar to international standards, along with the ISO 7010 symbols for Fire alarm call point, fire extinguisher and fire hose reel. (Note: ISO numbers: F005, F001, F002, respectably.) The standard also provides symbols for marking standpipe connectors and identifying what the standpipe connection supplies water to: fire sprinkler systems, standpipes or both.

The standard also contains symbols for informing for enforcing fire safety rules, such as prohibiting cooking, smoking, hanging of items from fire sprinklers, and use of elevators in evacuations.

==== Truss/floor construction ====
Changes in building design, towards "lightweight construction" (Note: Metal gusset plate trusses, wooden "I" beams and I-joists, open web truss, open web steel joist, panelized roofs.) in the late 20th century has presented new hazards to firefighters. The materials are prone to failure when exposed to flames, resulting in roof and floor collapses, spread of fire due to heat conduction in designs using metal. The placard's design varies from state to state, though numerous designs use triangles. All systems use the basic labeling system: "F" for "floor", "R" for "roof" and "RF" for "floor and roof". New York's system also includes information on the material trusses are constructed from. The states of Florida, New Jersey, New York, Vermont, and Mississippi; along with the cities of San Francisco, CA, Chesapeake, VA and Acushnet, MA have laws requiring posting of a truss warning placard on structures.

==== Vacant Building markings ====
On 3 December 1999, six firefighters died fighting a fire inside an abandoned six floor warehouse. The firefighters had entered the structure and became disoriented and unable to escape the maze-like interior before multiple collapses occurred. Following the disaster, the National Institute for Occupational Safety and Health recommended:

Recommendation #10: Fire departments should identify dangerous vacant buildings by affixing warning placards to entrance doorways or other openings where fire fighters may enter.

— Richard W. Braddee

In 2006, the International Code Council's International Fire Code introduced a marking system to help firefighters identify abandoned, vacant or unsafe structures and hazards posed by them. The system was devised from system used by the New York City Fire Department, recommended by NIOSH in the Worcester report, with modifications to color and sign dimensions. (Note: The FDNY system used 12 inches (300 mm) (later 18 inches (460 mm)) squares, painted with reflective yellow/lime-yellow paint.) The signs are red and white, 24 inches (610 mm) square, mounted on the front and entrances to the structure, with the date it was posted.

Section 311 - Vacant building placards

Structure is in normal condition as of the most recent inspection.

Interior firefighting and rescue operations should be conducted with caution, due to structural hazards.

Exterior firefighting only, with interior operations only to protect life.

To provide useful information in planning operations, signs can have letter combinations added to identify known hazards.

- R/O - Roof open
- S/M - Stairs, steps and landings missing
- F/E - Avoid fire escapes
- H/F - Holes in floor
- F/O - Floors open

== Vehicles ==
=== Abnormal transportation ===
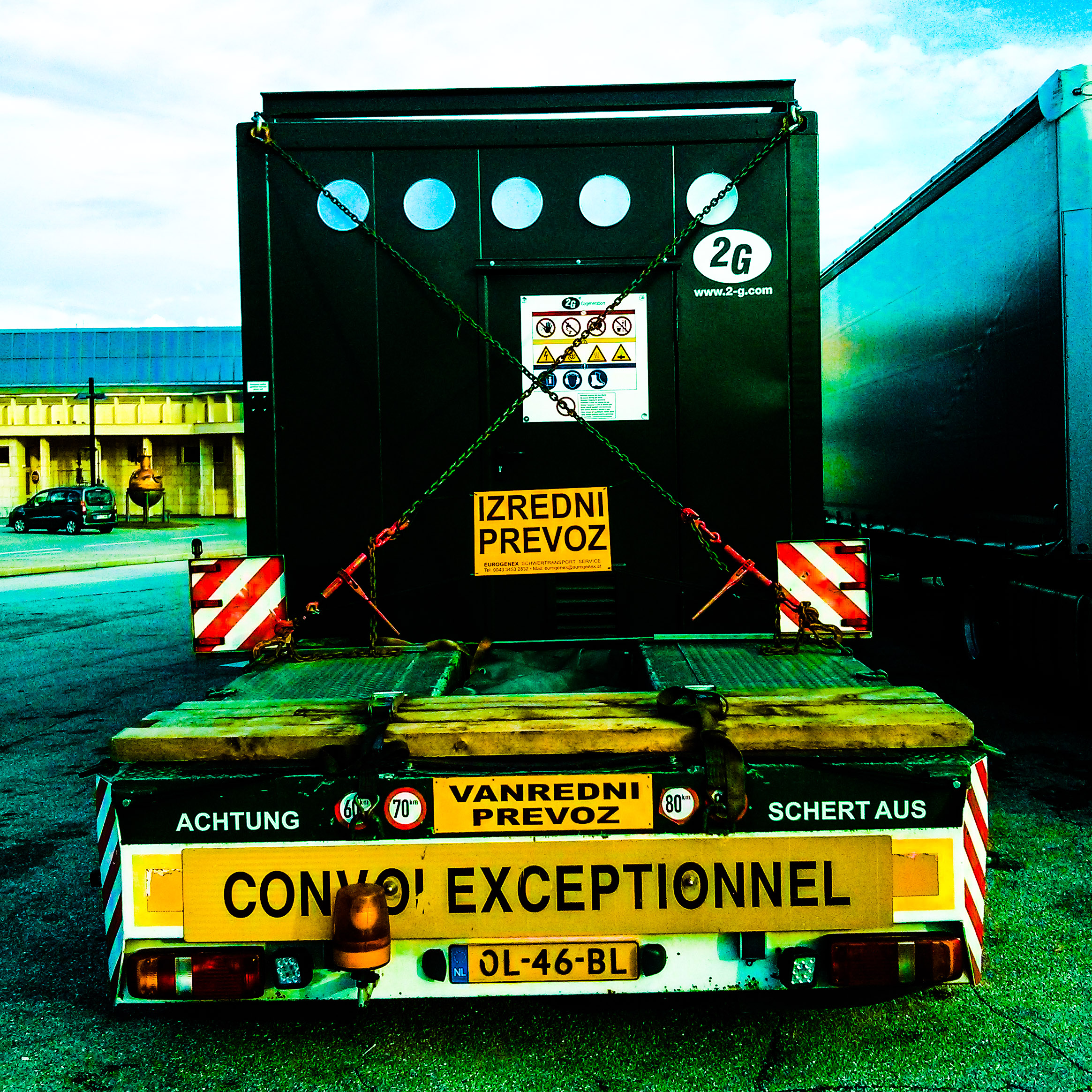
A Slovenian truck with Izredni prevoz, Vanredni Prevoz, Convoi exceptionnel (Note: In order: Slovenian, Bosnian, (Extraordinary Transportation) and French (Exceptional Convoy).) placards and red and white striped placards for defining the dimensions of the load.

Vehicles involved in oversize load transport display markings warning other road users that the vehicle's load may exceed the marked lane's width, unusually long, or tall. The transport vehicle may be forced to travel at unusually low speeds, make unusual maneuvers to avoid overhead hazards or complete turns.

=== Dangerous goods markings ===
	Class 1 - Explosives	Class 2.2 - Non-flammable gas	Class 3 - Flammable liquid	Class 8 - Corrosives	Class 9 - Miscellaneous
UN ADR					
United States					

=== ADR Treaty ===
Road vehicles carrying dangerous goods in countries that follow the European Agreement concerning the International Carriage of Dangerous Goods by Road (ADR), are required to display an orange plate on the front and rear of the vehicle. ADR marking display requirements:

- Vans, box trucks and curtain side trucks: blank orange plate, front and rear of vehicle. (Note: Placards must be displayed on these vehicles prior to going by sea.) (Note: Placards must be displayed on the sides and rear of vehicles carrying Class 1 - Explosives or Class 7 - Radioactive materials.)
- Road vehicles carrying shipping containers: Blank orange plate, front and rear of vehicle and appropriate hazard placard on all sides of the container.
- Tanker trucks, tank containers:Blank orange plate, front of vehicle; ADR Plate with HIN and UN number and hazard placard on both sides and rear of tank.
An ADR plate affixed to the front and rear of road vehicles carrying dangerous goods.

An ADR plate that displays Hazard identification number (top) and UN number (bottom).

=== United States Department of Transportation ===
In the United States, Hazardous goods are broken into two categories, Table 1 and Table 2. Materials on Table 1 must be placarded in any quantity.

Table 1
Class 1.1	Class 1.2	Class 1.3	Class 2.3	Class 4.3	Class 5.2 (Note: Organic Peroxide, Type B, Liquid or solid form. Temperature controlled.)	Class 6.1 (Note: Material poisonous by inhalation.)	Class 7 - Category III (Note: Only Category III materials.)

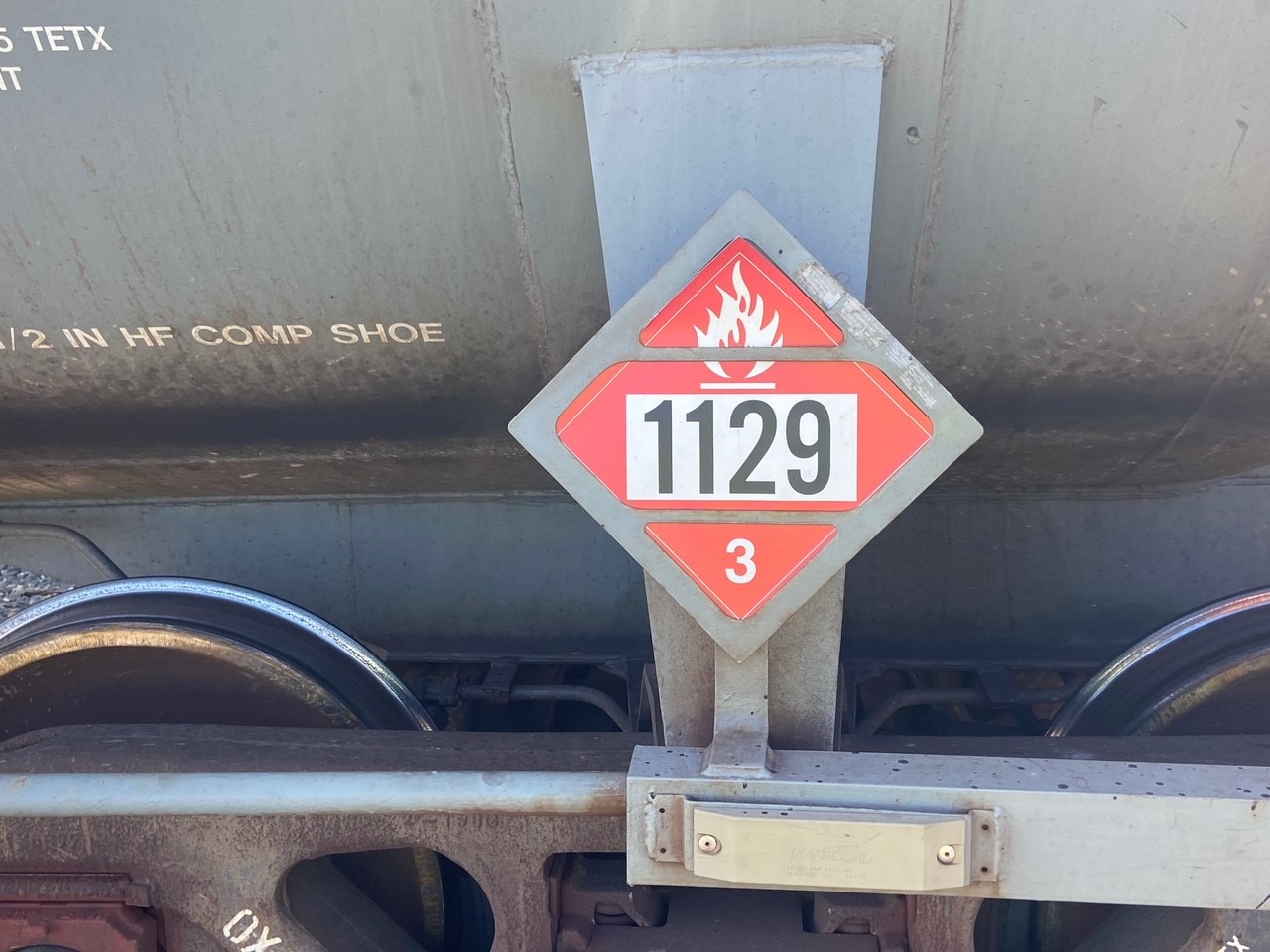
A U.S. DOT placard mounted on a railway tank car. The placard displays UN number 1129, indicating butyraldehyde, as well as the pictogram for a flammable liquid.

Materials on Table 2, which is all other hazardous materials not in Table 1, (Note: 1.4, 1.5, 1.6, 2.1, 2.2, 3, Combustible liquids, 4.1, 4.2, 5.1, 5.2 (Excluding those listed on Table 1), 6.1 (Excluding poisonous by inhalation), 6.2, 8, 9, ORM-D/Limited Quantities.) must display placard if 1,001 pounds (454 kg) or more of the material is loaded into a vehicle. If 1,000 pounds (450 kg) or less of a Table 2 material is loaded onto the vehicle, the placard is optional.

Placards are required on all four sides of any motor vehicles, rail cars, and shipping containers loaded with hazardous materials. It must be attached upright, securely, kept in good condition, not obstructed by ladders, pipes or tarpaulins. It must be located at least 3 inches (76 mm) from other markings that could reduce its effectiveness.

The law also prohibits the display of placards on vehicles that are not loaded with the hazardous material listed on the placard, (Note: For example: displaying a "Class 3 - Flammable" placard when the vehicle is loaded with Class 1.1 Explosives.) placards that do not meet design guidelines in § 172.519 General specifications for placards, or displaying advertising and slogans in a design or manner that could be confused for a placard. (Note: An example of advertising that resembles the design of a placard is the logo for the Burning River Roller Derby.) (Note: For example, older placard holders that had a "blank" placard for when non-hazardous materials were loaded that said "Drive Safely".)

== Other uses ==
In Model United Nations, the paper nameplate of a delegation is referred to as a "placard".

In computer graphical user interfaces, a placard is a rectangular area of a window meant for displaying information to the user.

In the Habsburg Netherlands (1482–1794) and the Dutch Republic (1581–1795) laws were often known as "Placards" (Dutch: plakkaat) after their form of publication by way of a placard that was nailed to a wall in a public place. An important example is the Dutch declaration of independence of 1581, known in Dutch as Plakkaat van Verlatinghe.

== See also ==
- Affair of the Placards (French: Affaire des Placards), 17 October 1534 anti-Catholic incident where posters appeared in public places in five major French cities which brought an end to the conciliatory policies of King Francis I.
- Election placard (lawn sign)
- Poster
- Sign war
