= Political campaign =

Attempt to influence the decision-making process within a specific group

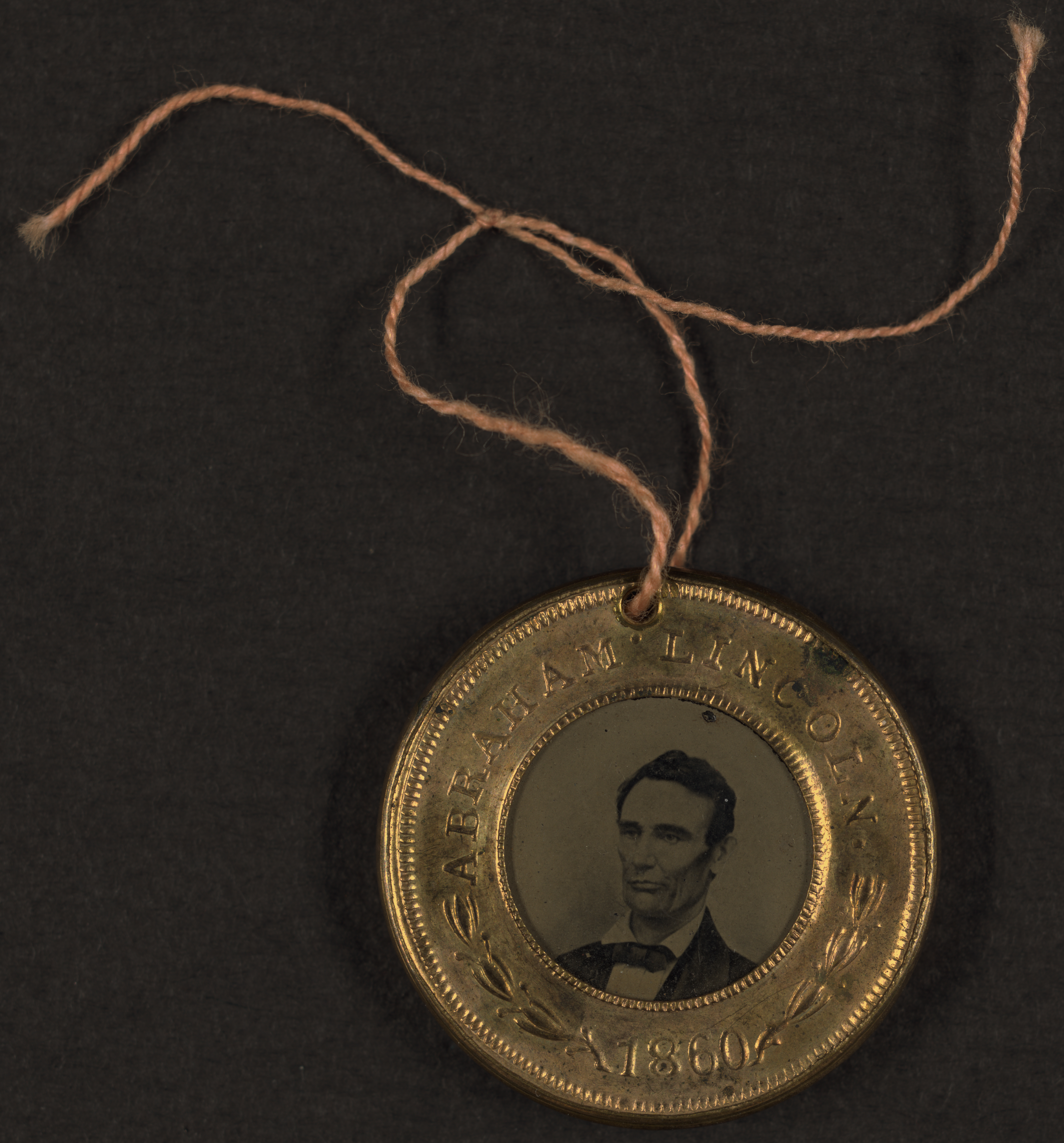
Presidential campaign button for Abraham Lincoln, 1860. The reverse side of the button shows a portrait of his running mate Hannibal Hamlin.

A political campaign is an organized effort which seeks to influence the decision making progress within a specific group. In democracies, political campaigns often refer to electoral campaigns, by which representatives are chosen or referendums are decided. In modern politics, the most high-profile political campaigns are focused on general elections and candidates for head of state or head of government, often a president or prime minister.

== Campaign message ==
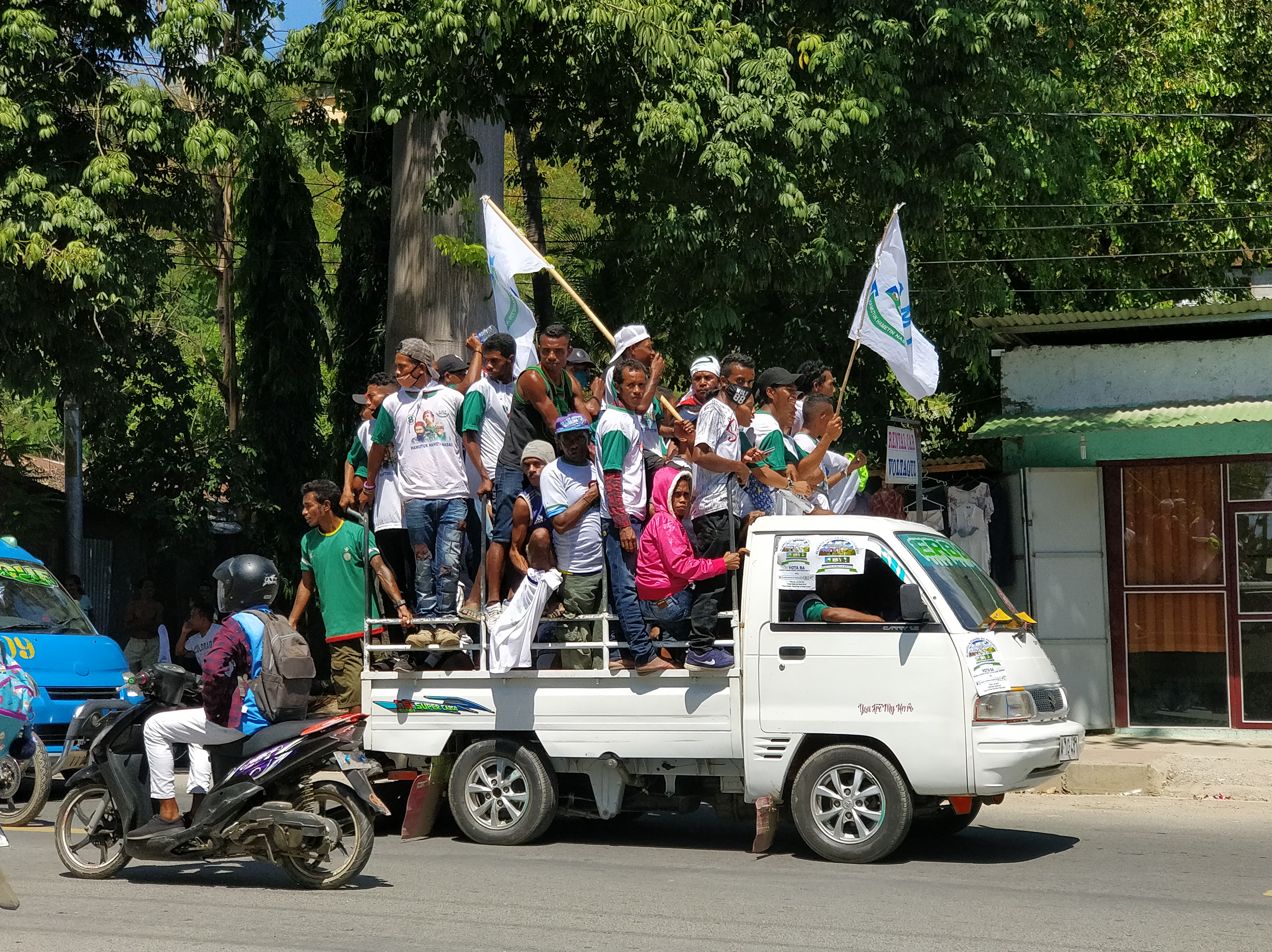
Election campaign in East Timor: Truck Rally

The message of the campaign contains the ideas that the candidate wants to share with the voters. It is to get those who agree with their ideas to support them when running for a political position. The message often consists of several talking points about policy issues. The points summarize the main ideas of the campaign and are repeated frequently in order to create a lasting impression with the voters. In many elections, the opposition party will try to get the candidate "off message" by bringing up policy or personal questions that are not related to the talking points. Most campaigns prefer to keep the message broad in order to attract the most potential voters. A message that is too narrow can alienate voters or slow the candidate down with explaining details. For example, in the 2008 American presidential election John McCain originally used a message that focused on his patriotism and political experience: "Country First"; later the message was changed to shift attention to his role as "The Original Maverick" within the political establishment. Barack Obama ran on a consistent, simple message of "change" throughout his campaign.

According to a 2024 study, political practitioners in the United States poorly predict what kind of messaging is persuasive to the public. The study found that practitioners performed barely better than chance at predicting persuasive effects; practitioners performed about as well as laypeople in predicting persuasive effects; and that practitioners' experience, expertise, information environment, and demographics did affect their accuracy.

== Campaign finance ==
Fundraising techniques include having the candidate call or meet with large donors, sending direct mail pleas to small donors, and courting interest groups who could end up spending millions on the race if it is significant to their interests. Funds can also funnel through something called a Political Action Committee (PAC) which the Supreme Court allowed in Citizens United v. FEC (2010). Outside spending may exceed campaign spending.

== Organization ==
In a modern political campaign, the campaign organization (or "machine") will have a coherent structure of personnel in the same manner as any business of similar size. The difference is it is a group paid employees and unpaid volunteers. Campaigns are run by campaign managers, political consultants, and activist or volunteers.

=== Campaign manager ===
A campaign manager's primary duty is to ensure marketing campaigns achieve their objectives. They work with the marketing manager to create, execute and monitor the performance of campaigns and provide all the resources required to meet sales targets. Campaign managers lead the way in fundraising and managing campaign budgets, advertising and shaping chosen messages to particular audiences, polling, and getting out to vote. They are the face of the campaign behind the candidate and are required to plan and implement campaign strategies.

=== Political consultants ===
Political consultants advise campaigns on virtually all of their activities, from research to field strategy. Consultants conduct candidate research, voter research, and opposition research for their clients. Their primary focus is mass media and controlling the image.

=== Activists ===
In the context of political campaigns, activists are "foot soldiers" loyal to a campaign's cause. As supporters, they promote the campaign as volunteer activists. Such volunteers and interns may take part in activities such as canvassing door-to-door and making phone calls on behalf of the campaigns.

== Techniques ==
A campaign team (which may be as small as one inspired individual, or a heavily resourced group of professionals) must consider how to communicate the message of the campaign, recruit volunteers, and raise money. Campaign advertising draws on techniques from commercial advertising and propaganda, also entertainment and public relations, a mixture dubbed politainment. The avenues available to political campaigns when distributing their messages is limited by the law, available resources, and the imagination of the campaigns' participants. These techniques are often combined into a formal strategy known as the campaign plan. The plan takes account of a campaign's goal, message, target audience, and resources available. The campaign will typically seek to identify supporters at the same time as getting its message across. The modern, open campaign method was pioneered by Aaron Burr during the American presidential election of 1800.

Another modern campaign method by political scientist Joel Bradshaw points out four key propositions for developing a successful campaign strategy. "First, in any election the electorate can be divided into three groups: the candidate's base, the opponent's base, and the undecided. Second, past election results, data from registered voter lists, and survey research make it possible to determine which people fall into each of these three groups. Third, it is neither possible nor necessary to get the support of all people. Fourth, and last, once a campaign has identified how to win, it can act to create the circumstances to bring about this victory. In order to succeed, campaigns should direct campaign resources – money, time, and message – to key groups of potential voters and nowhere else."

=== Campaign communication ===
Election campaign communication refers to party-controlled communication, e.g. campaign advertising, and party-uncontrolled communication, e.g. media coverage of elections. It is the strategy used to sway public opinion and gather support for a candidate.

=== Campaign advertising ===
Campaign advertising is the use of paid media (newspapers, radio, television, etc.) to influence the decisions made for and by groups. The ads are designed by political consultants and the campaign's staff as it is part of their role. The use of campaign advertising varies around the world. In the United States its a free market but in some countries like Ireland its forbidden to advertise campaigns.

=== Media management ===
Media management refers to the ability of a political campaign to control the message that it broadcasts to the public. The forms of media used in political campaigns can be classified into two distinct categories: "paid media" or "earned media". There are times where some campaigns get little attention, but the ones that do get highlighted for the effectiveness and dramatic events. In the book Campaigns and Elections by author John Sides, it says, "For those that do get attention, media coverage often emphasizes what is new, dramatic, or scandalous. Unlike the candidates themselves, the news media or at least those outlets that strive for objectivity are not seeking to manipulate citizens into voting for their particular candidates." (Sides 2018).

Paid media refers to any media attention that is directly generated from spending. This form of media is commonly found through political advertisements and organized events. An advantage of paid media is that it allows political campaigns to tailor the messages they show the public and control when the public sees them. Campaigns often prioritize spending in contested regions and increase their paid media expenses as an election approaches. Electoral campaigns often conclude with a "closing argument ad", an advertisement that summarizes the campaign's core themes and explains the candidate's vision for the future. In the 2020 US presidential election, Joe Biden's "Rising" ad starts with him saying "we're in a battle for the soul of this nation" and a worker in Donald Trump's Pennsylvania ad stated "that will be the end of my job and thousands of others" if Trump lost.

Earned media describes free media coverage, often from news stories or social media posts. Unlike paid media, earned media does not incur an expense to the campaign. Earned media does not imply that the political campaign is mentioned in a positive manner. Political campaigns may often receive earned media from gaffes or scandals. In the 2016 United States Presidential Election, a majority of the media coverage surrounding Hillary Clinton was focused on her scandals, with the most prevalent topics being topics related to her emails.

Experts say that effective media management is an essential component of a successful political campaign. Studies show that candidates with higher media attention tend to have greater success in elections. Each form of media can influence the other. Paid media may raise the newsworthiness of an event which could lead to an increase in earned media. Campaigns may also spend money to emphasize stories circulating through media networks. Research suggests that neither form of media is inherently superior. A 2009 study found that media coverage was not significantly more effective than paid advertisements.

=== Demonstrations ===
Many political campaigns include demonstrations, marches, protests and other forms of public mobilization for expressing support or opposition to candidates, parties, political issues or policies. This kind of public mobilization demonstrates the level of the public's support for a cause and draw media and public attention to certain issues. During election campaigns demonstrations may influence a boarder electoral section and later affect political attitudes and voting behavior.

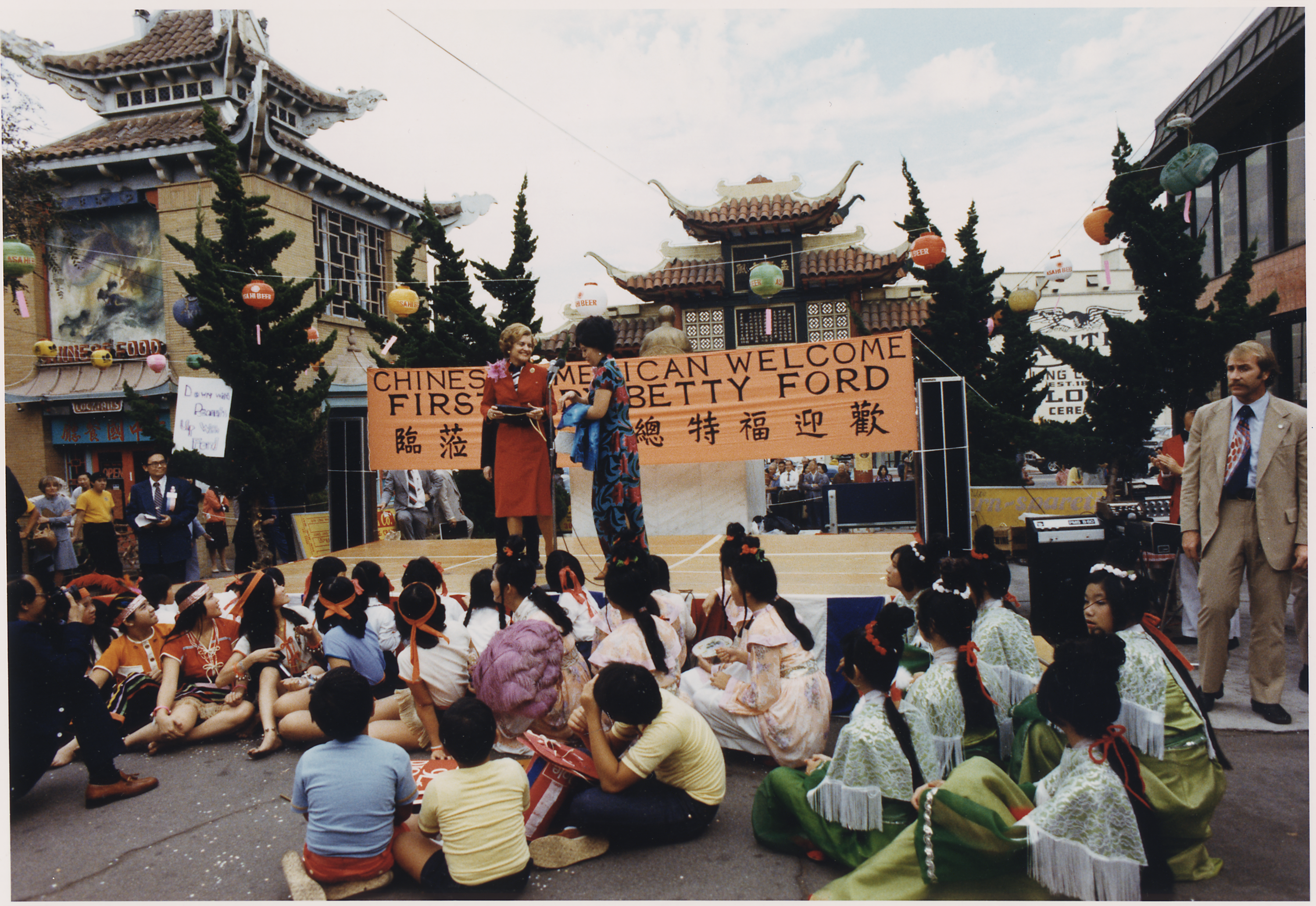
A political rally in Chinatown, Los Angeles, featuring Betty Ford campaigning for her husband, U.S. President Gerald Ford, during the 1976 presidential campaign

=== Modern technology and the internet ===
The internet is now a core element of modern political campaigns. Communication technologies such as e-mail, websites, and podcasts for various forms of activism enable faster communications by citizen movements and deliver a message to a large audience. These Internet technologies are used for cause-related fundraising, lobbying, volunteering, community building, and organizing. Individual political candidates are also using the internet to promote their election campaign. In a study of Norwegian election campaigns, politicians reported they used social media for marketing and for dialogue with voters. Facebook was the primary platform for marketing and Twitter was used for more continuous dialogue.

Signifying the importance of internet political campaigning, Barack Obama's presidential campaign relied heavily on social media, Search Engine Optimization (SEO) and new media channels to engage voters, recruit campaign volunteers, and raise campaign funds. The campaign brought the spotlight on the importance of using internet in new-age political campaigning by utilizing various forms of social media and new media (including Facebook, YouTube and a custom generated social engine) to reach new target populations. The campaign's social website, my.BarackObama.com, utilized a low cost and efficient method of mobilizing voters and increasing participation among various voter populations. This new media was incredibly successful at reaching the younger population while helping all populations organize and promote action. In the book Campaigns and Elections author John sides also speaks upon this on page 235 and says, "Online communities can still promote involvement in campaigns: large experiments on Facebook found that users who saw that their Facebook friends had reported voting were themselves a bit more likely to turn out to vote. But there is also evidence that offering token public support for a cause on Facebook or Twitter may make one less likely to be involved in offline campaign activities" (Sides 2018).

Now, online election campaign information can be shared in a rich information format through campaign landing pages, integrating Google's rich snippets, structured data, social media open graphs, and husting support file formats for YouTube like .sbv, .srt, and .vtt. High proficiency and effective algorithmic integration will be the core factor in the framework. This technology integration helps campaign information reach a wide audience in split-seconds. This was successfully tested and implemented in the 2015 Aruvikkara election and the 2020 Kerala elections. Marcus Giavanni, social media consultant, blockchain developer and second place opponent in the 2015 Denver mayoral election, was first to file for the 2019 election. Marcus Giavanni used advanced algorithms, artificial intelligence, and voice indexing predictions to box in campaigns.

Political campaigns also use social-media frames and sharable links to reach supporters quickly at low distribution cost. Brazilian Politician Marcos Pereira used a campaign frame for his 2026 Federal Deputy election campaign.

=== Husting ===
A husting, or the hustings, was originally a physical platform from which representatives presented their views or cast votes before a parliamentary or other election body. By metonymy, the term may now refer to any event, such as debates or speeches, during an election campaign where one or more of the representative candidates are present. In modern terms it means the campaign trail in Canada and Britain.

=== Other techniques ===
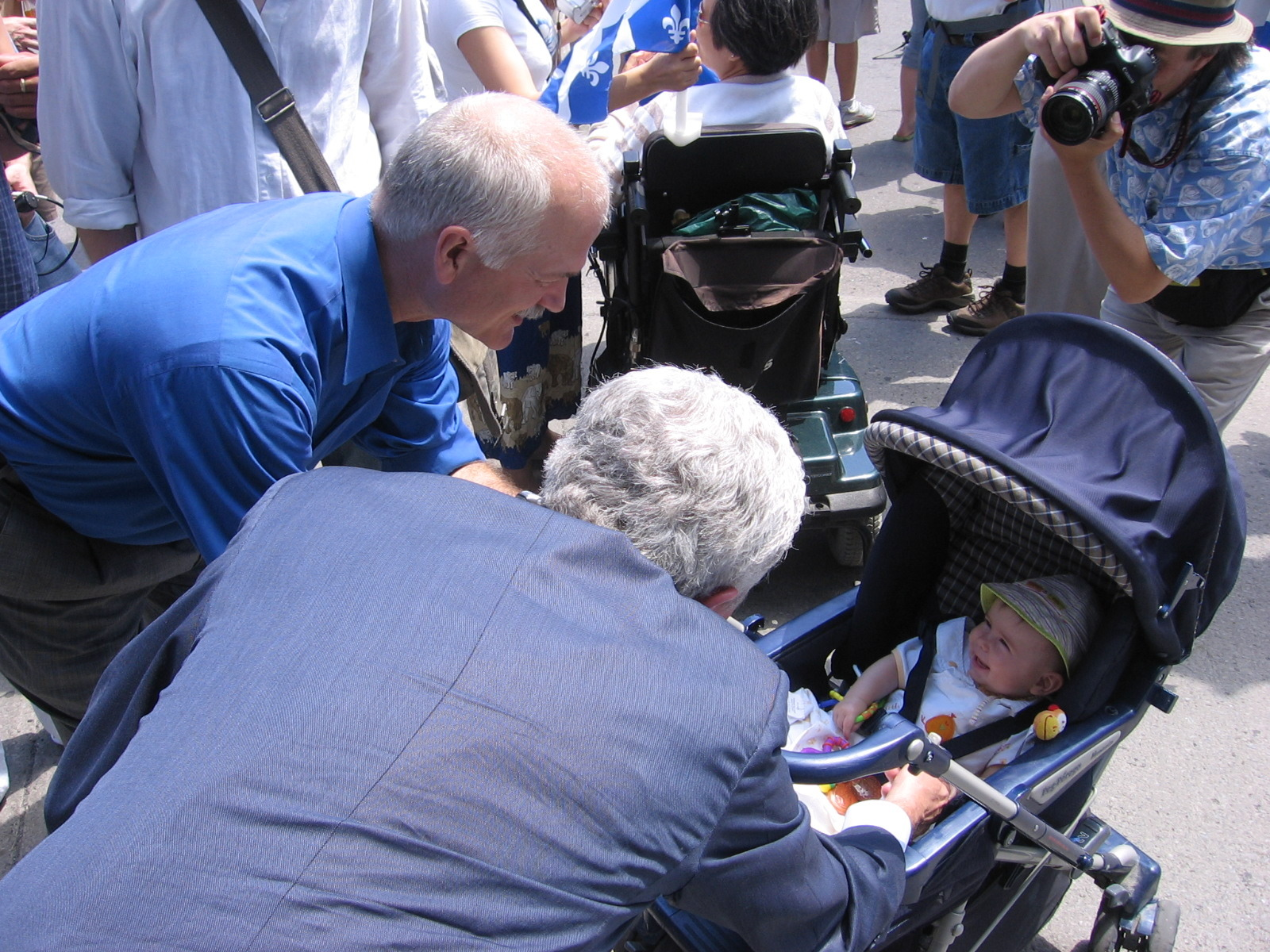
NDP leader Jack Layton and Bloc Québécois leader Gilles Duceppe greet babies – a traditional campaign activity – at the Fête nationale du Québec in Montreal.

- Writing directly to members of the public (either via a professional marketing firm or, particularly on a small scale, by volunteers)
- By distributing leaflets or selling newspapers
- Election posters
- Phone Banking
- Through websites, online communities, and solicited or unsolicited bulk email
- Through a new technique known as microtargeting that helps identify and target small demographic slices of voters
- Through a whistlestop tour - a series of brief appearances in several small towns
- Hampering the ability of political competitors to campaign, by such techniques as counter-rallies, picketing of rival parties' meetings, or overwhelming rival candidates' offices with mischievous phone calls (most political parties in representative democracies publicly distance themselves from such disruptive and morale-affecting tactics, with the exception of those parties self-identifying as activist)
- Using endorsements of other celebrated party members to boost support (see coattail effect)
- Using a campaign surrogate - a celebrity or person of influence, campaigning on a candidate's behalf
- Remaining close to or at home to make speeches to supporters who come to visit as part of a front porch campaign
- Vote-by-mail, previously known as "absentee ballots", have grown significantly in importance as an election tool. Campaigns in most states must have a strategy in place to impact early voting.
- Sale of official campaign merchandise (colloquially known as swag, in reference to the baiting technique) as a way of commuting a competitor's popularity into campaign donations, volunteer recruitment, and free advertising

== Campaign types ==
=== Informational campaign ===
An informational campaign is a political campaign designed to raise public awareness and support for the positions of a candidate (or her/his party). It is more intense than a paper campaign, which consists of little more than filing the necessary papers to get on the ballot, but is less intense than a competitive campaign, which aims to actually win election to the office. An informational campaign typically focuses on low-cost outreach such as news releases, getting interviewed in the paper, making a brochure for door to door distribution, organizing poll workers, etc.

=== Paper campaign ===
A paper campaign is a political campaign in which the candidate only files the necessary paperwork to appear on the ballot. The purpose of such a token effort may be simply to increase name awareness of a minor political party, to give voters of a certain ideology an opportunity to vote accordingly, or to ensure that the party has candidates in every constituency. It can be a cost-effective means of attracting media coverage. An informational campaign, by contrast, may involve news releases, newspaper interviews, door-to-door campaigning, and organizing polls. As the level of seriousness rises, the marginal cost of reaching more people rises accordingly, due to the high cost of TV commercials, paid staff, etc. which are used by competitive campaigns. Paper candidates do not expect to be elected and usually run simply as a way of helping the more general campaign. However, an unexpected surge in support for the party may result in many paper candidates being unexpectedly elected, as for example happened to the New Democratic Party in Quebec during the 2011 federal election.

== Effects ==
A 2018 study in the American Political Science Review found that campaigns have "an average effect of zero in general elections". The study found two instances where campaigning was effective: "First, when candidates take unusually unpopular positions and campaigns invest unusually heavily in identifying persuadable voters. Second, when campaigns contact voters long before election day and measure effects immediately — although this early persuasion decays."

One reason why it is hard to judge the effectiveness of an election campaign is because many people know who they want to vote for long before the campaigns are started. Voters are more likely to vote for a nominee based on whose values align closest with theirs. Studies suggest that party flips come from the analysis of how a voter sees their parties performance in the years before a campaign even begins.

Another study suggests that at the 2017 Austrian legislative election, 31% of voters admitted to either developing of changing their party preferences during the election campaign. The study provides data that shows how the main parties within Austria had differing levels of voters flipping toward them, thus proving that an election campaign has some level of effectiveness that differs between parties, depending on factors such as media presence.

=== Spending ===
In presidential campaigns in the United States, research indicates that a $10 million advantage in spending in an individual states leads to approximately 27,000 more votes for the campaign in the state, which can be sufficient to win a close race. In down-ballot races, spending matters more. Scholars have estimated that a $2 million advantage can net a Senate campaign 10,000 votes.

=== Presidential campaigns ===
A large body of political science research emphasizes how "fundamentals" – the state of the economy, whether the country is at war, how long the president's party has held the office, and which candidate is more ideologically moderate – predict presidential election outcomes. However, campaigns may be necessary to enlighten otherwise uninformed voters about the fundamentals, which thus become increasingly predictive of preferences as the campaign progresses. Research suggests that "the 2012 presidential campaigns increased turnout in highly targeted states by 7–8 percentage points, on average, indicating that modern campaigns can significantly alter the size and composition of the voting population".

==== National conventions ====
A consensus in the political science literature holds that national conventions usually have a measurable effect on presidential elections that is relatively resistant to decay.

==== Presidential and vice-presidential debates ====
Research is mixed on the precise impact of debates. Rather than encourage viewers to update their political views in accordance with the most persuasive arguments, viewers instead update their views to merely reflect what their favored candidate is saying.

==== Presidential primaries ====
The fundamentals matter less in the outcome of presidential primaries. One prominent theory holds that the outcome of presidential primaries is largely determined by the preferences of party elites. Presidential primaries are therefore less predictive, as various types of events may impact elites' perception of the viability of candidates. Gaffes, debates and media narratives play a greater role in primaries than in presidential elections.

=== Strategies ===
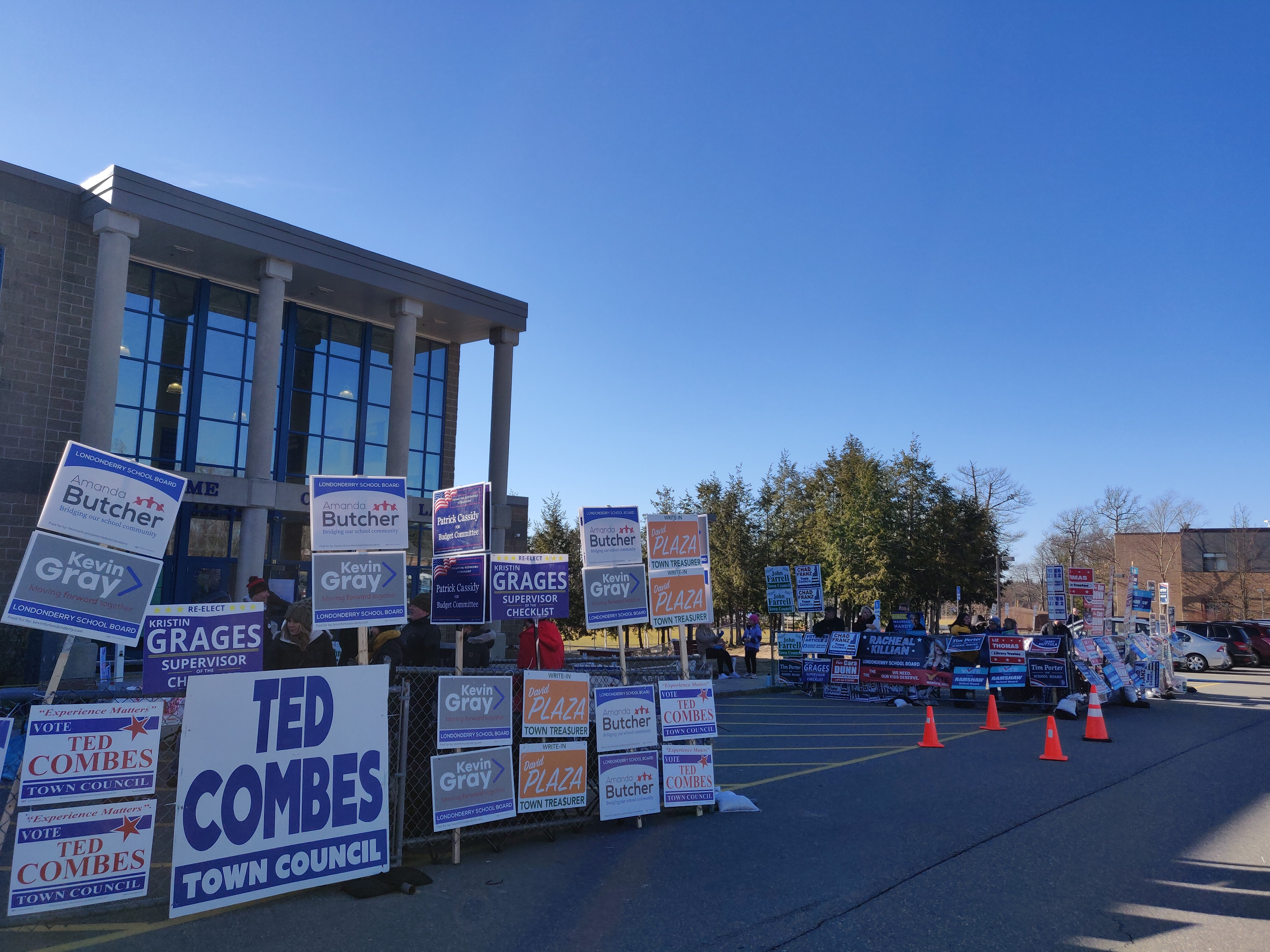
Electioneering in front of a voting location for municipal elections in New Hampshire in 2022

Traditional ground campaigning and voter contacts remain the most effective strategies. Some research suggests that knocking on doors can increase turnout by as much as 10% and phone calls by as much as 4%. One study suggests that lawn signs increase vote share by 1.7 percentage points. A review of more than 200 get-out-the-vote experiments finds that the most effective tactics are personal: Door-to-door canvassing increases turnout by an average of about 2.5 percentage points; volunteer phone calls raise it by about 1.9 points, compared to 1.0 points for calls from commercial phone banks; automated phone messages are ineffective. Using out-of-state volunteers for canvassing is less effective in increasing turnout than using local and trained volunteers.

There are many different types of strategies that are also used during these campaigns that target certain people and try to win them over. people are also paid to help get candidates to vote for a certain side. In the book Campaigns and Elections, author John Sides says, "Campaigns involve a variety of actors. More visible are the candidates themselves. Their strategic choices involve every facet of a campaign: whether to run in the first place, what issues to emphasize, what specific messages or themes to discuss, which kinds of media to use, and which citizens to target."

According to political scientists Donald Green and Alan Gerber, it costs $31 to produce a vote going door to door, $91-$137 to produce a vote by sending out direct mailers, $47 per vote from leafletting, $58-$125 per vote from commercial phone banking, and $20-$35 per vote from voluntary phone banking. A 2018 study in the American Economic Review found that door-to-door canvassing on behalf of the Francois Hollande campaign in the 2012 French presidential election "did not affect turnout, but increased Hollande's vote share in the first round and accounted for one fourth of his victory margin in the second. Visits' impact persisted in later elections, suggesting a lasting persuasion effect." According to a 2018 study, repeated get-out-the-vote phone calls had diminishing effects but each additional phone call increased the probability to vote by 0.6-1.0 percentage points. Another 2018 study found that "party leaflets boost turnout by 4.3 percentage points while canvassing has a small additional effect (0.6 percentage points)" in a United Kingdom election.

A 2016 study found that visits by a candidate to states have modest effects: "visits are most effective in influencing press coverage at the national level and within battleground states. Visits' effects on voters themselves, however, are much more modest than consultants often claim, and visits appear to have no effects outside the market that hosts a visit." The authors of the study argue that it would be more effective for campaigns to go to the pockets of the country where wealthy donors are (for fundraising) and hold rallies in the populous states both to attract national press and raise funds. A 2005 study found that campaign visits had no statistically significant effect, after controlling for other factors, on voter turnout in the 1992, 1996, and 2000 elections. On the other hand, a 2017 paper of the 1948 presidential election provides "strong evidence that candidate visits can influence electoral returns". Other research also provides evidence that campaign visits increase vote share.

Campaigns may also rely on strategically placed field offices to acquire votes. The Obama 2008 campaign's extensive use of field offices has been credited as crucial to winning in the states of Indiana and North Carolina. Each field office that the Obama campaign opened in 2012 gave him approximately a 0.3% greater vote share. According to one study, the cost per vote by having a field office is $49.40. A 2024 study found "that campaign offices help candidates in small but meaningful ways, delivering modest but quantifiable increases in candidate vote share in the areas where they open... Field offices can increase candidate vote share, but their value differs across parties: Democrats benefit more in battleground states and populous areas, while Republicans' largely rural base of support in recent years provides challenges for maximizing the benefits of in-person organizing."

According to a 2020 study, campaign spending on messaging to voters affects voter support for candidates. Another 2020 study found that political advertising had small effects regardless of context, message, sender, and receiver. A 2022 study found that voters are persuadable to switch support for candidates when they are exposed to new information.

Political science research generally finds negative advertisement (which has increased over time) to be ineffective both at reducing the support and turnout for the opponent. A 2021 study in the American Political Science Review found that television campaign ads do affect election outcomes, in particular in down-ballot races. According to political scientists Stephen Ansolabehere and Shanto Iyengar, negative ads do succeed at driving down overall turnout though. A 2019 study of online political advertising conducted by a party in the 2016 Berlin state election campaign found that the online-ad campaign "increased the party's vote share by 0.7 percentage points" and that factual ads were more effective than emotional ads.

== History ==
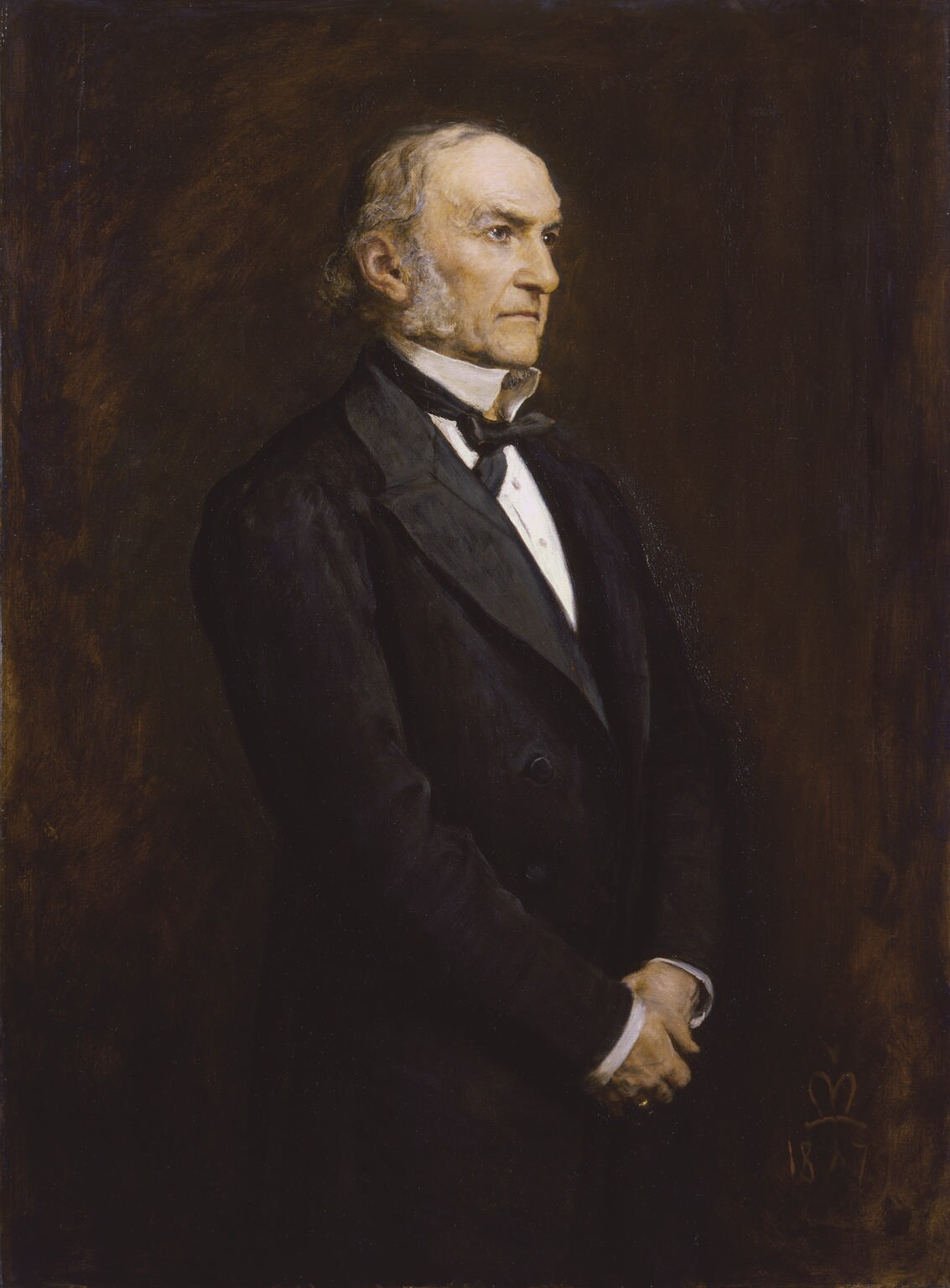
Portrait of William Ewart Gladstone by John Everett Millais in 1879, during the Midlothian campaign

Political campaigns have existed as long as there have been informed citizens to campaign amongst. Democratic societies have regular election campaigns, but political campaigning can occur on particular issues even in non-democracies so long as freedom of expression is allowed. Often mass campaigns are started by the less privileged or anti-establishment viewpoints (as against more powerful interests whose first resort is lobbying). The phenomenon of political campaigns are tightly tied to lobby groups and political parties.

The first modern campaign is often described as William Ewart Gladstone's Midlothian campaign in 1878–80, although there may be earlier recognizably modern examples from the 19th century. The 1896 William McKinley presidential campaign laid the groundwork for modern campaigns.

=== History of election campaigns in America ===
In the 19th Century, American presidential candidates seldom traveled or made speeches in support of their candidacies. Through 1904, only eight major presidential candidates did so (William Henry Harrison in 1840, Winfield Scott in 1852, Stephen A. Douglas in 1860, Horatio Seymour in 1868, Horace Greeley in 1872, James A. Garfield in 1880, James G. Blaine in 1884, William Jennings Bryan in 1896 and 1900, and Alton B. Parker in 1904), whereas every major presidential candidate since then has done so, with the sole exception of Calvin Coolidge in 1924. In 1896, William McKinley recruited the help of Marcus A. Hanna. Hanna devised a plan to have voters come to McKinley. McKinley won the race with 51% of the votes.

The development of new technologies has completely changed the way political campaigns are run. In the late 20th Century, campaigns shifted into television and radio broadcasts. The early 2000s brought interactive websites. By 2008 the world of campaigns was available to millions of people through the internet and social media programs. 2008 marked a new era of digital elections because of the fast-paced movement of information.

== See also ==
Techniques and traditions

- Assumed Incumbency
- Artificial intelligence and elections - Use of AI in elections and political campaigning.
- Election litter
- Election promise
- Lawn sign
  - Sign war
- Microtargeting
- Permanent campaign
- Robocalls & Personalized audio messaging
- Votebank

General topics

- Civics
- Media manipulation
- Minimal effects hypothesis

== Sources ==
=== World ===
- Abizadeh, Arash (2005). "Democratic Elections without Campaigns? Normative Foundations of National Baha'i Elections". World Order. 37 (1): 7–49.
- Barnes, S. H., and M. Kaase Political Action: Mass Participation in Five Western Democracies. Sage, 1979.
- Blewett, Neal. The Peers, the Parties and the People: The General Elections of 1910. London: Macmillan, 1972.
- Hix, S. The Political System of the European Union. St. Martin's Press, 1999.
- Katz, Richard S., and Peter Mair (eds.), How Parties Organize: Change and Adaptation in Party Organizations in Western Democracies. Sage Publications, 1994.
- Katz, Richard S.; Mair, Peter (1995). "Changing Models of Party Organization and Party Democracy: The Emergence of the Cartel Party". Party Politics. 1: 5–28. doi:10.1177/1354068895001001001. S2CID 143611762.
- LaPalombara, Joseph and Myron Wiener (eds.), Political Parties and Political Development. Princeton University Press, 1966.
- Panebianco, A. Political Parties: Organization and Power. Cambridge University Press, 1988.
- Paquette, Laure. Campaign Strategy. New York: Nova, 2006.
- Poguntke, Thomas, and Paul Webb, eds. The Presidentialization of Politics: A Comparative Study of Modern Democracies. Oxford University Press. 2005 online
- Ware, Alan. Citizens, Parties and the State: A Reappraisal. Princeton University Press, 1987.
- Webb, Paul, David Farrell, and Ian Holliday, Political Parties in Advanced Industrial Democracies. Oxford University Press, 2002

=== United States ===
- Bruce A. Bimber and Richard Davis, Campaigning Online: the Internet in U.S. Elections. Oxford University Press, 2003.
- Cunningham, Sean P. Cowboy Conservatism: Texas and the Rise of the Modern Right. Lexington: University Press of Kentucky, 2010.
- Robert J. Dinkin. Campaigning in America: A History of Election Practice. Westport: Greenwood, 1989.
- Kirsten A. Foot and Steven M. Schneider, Web Campaigning. The MIT Press, 2006.
- John Gerring, Party Ideologies in America, 1828–1996. New York: Cambridge University Press, 1998.
- Lewis L. Gould, Grand Old Party: A History of the Republicans. New York: Random House, 2003.
- Justin A. Gravely. Campaigning on American Soil and the Rules of the American Government. Cambridge University Press, 2014
- Gary C. Jacobson. The Politics of Congressional Elections (5th edition). New York: Longman, 2000.
- Richard Jensen, The Winning of the Midwest: Social and Political Conflict, 1888–1896. Chicago: University of Chicago Press, 1971.
- L. Sandy Meisel, ed. Political Parties and Elections in the United States: An Encyclopedia. New York: Garland, 1991.
- Arthur M. Schlesinger Jr., ed. History of American Presidential Elections. 4 vols. New York: Chelsea House, 1971.
- James A. Thurber, Campaigns and Elections American Style (2nd edition). New York: Westview Press, 2004.
