= Flyposting =

Marketing tactic

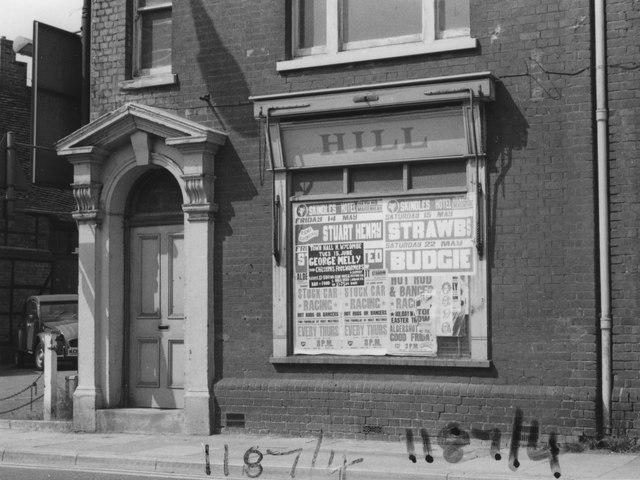
- Fly posters advertising Strawbs, Budgie, George Melly, and other acts in Henley-on-Thames, 1976
- Media: Poster
- Preceded by: Guerrilla marketing
- Followed by: Street marketing

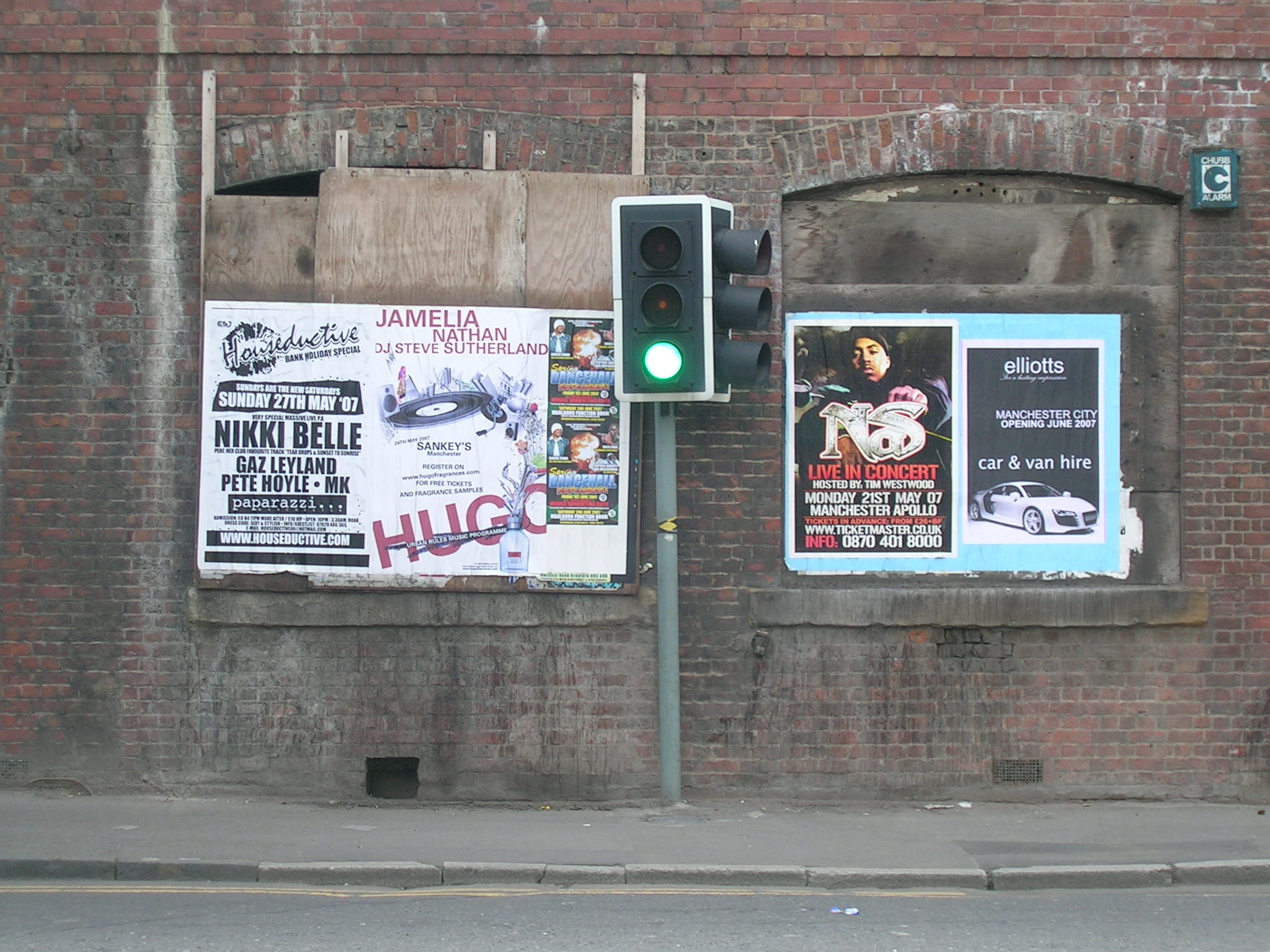
Flyposted posters in Manchester, England, 2007

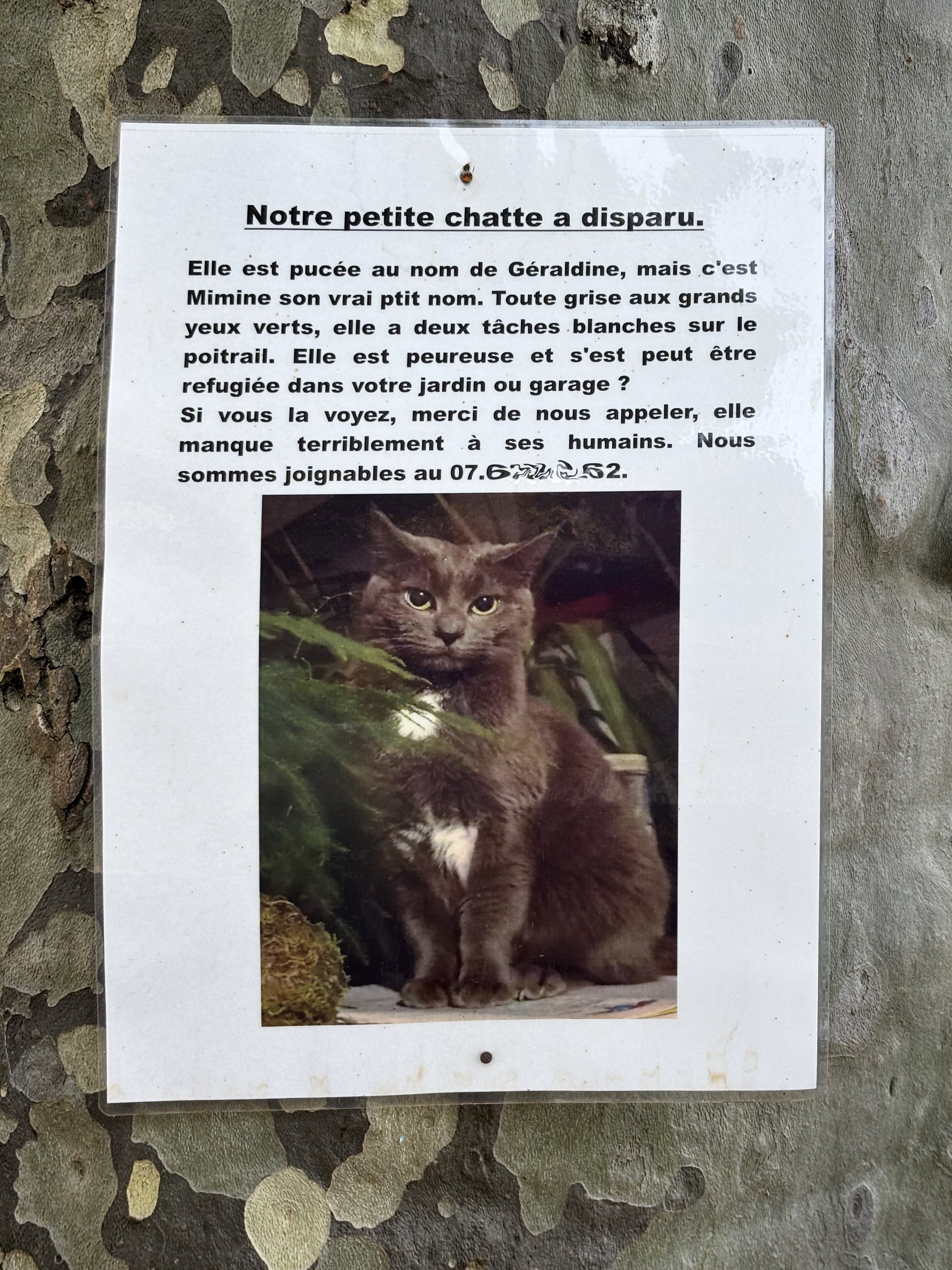
A lost cat poster in France, 2025

Flyposting (also known as bill posting) is a guerrilla marketing tactic where advertising posters (also known as flyers) are put up in public view. In the United States, the technique is commonly referred to as wheatpasting, because wheatpaste is often used to adhere the posters. Posters are often adhered to construction site barricades, building façades and in alleyways.

== Advertisement posters ==
The posters used are typically made of a lightweight paper and printed using flexography, digital printing and screen printing. Modern printing techniques enable the posters to feature full-colour designs, halftones, and photographs, making them popular for advertising concerts, political messages, commercial advertisements and special events. An increasing number of posters do not advertise anything at all and instead feature artwork, inspirational or positive messages, and religious messages.

It is an advertising tactic mostly used by small businesses promoting concerts and political activist groups, but there have been occasions where international companies subcontracted local advertising agencies for flyposting jobs in order not to get caught in illegal behavior, as a form of guerrilla marketing. In 2004, Sony Music and BMG were threatened with anti-social behaviour orders by Camden Borough Council for illegal flyposting.

== Legislation ==
In many countries, it is illegal to place such posters on private property without the consent of the property owner, or to post on public property without a sign permit from the local government. Some areas, however, have public bulletin boards where notices may be posted.

In an effort to discourage illegal flyposting, surfaces at risk of it are sometimes permanently signed Post No Bills (US), No Flyposting (UK), or Défense d'afficher - loi du 29 juillet 1881 (France), a reference to a law passed in 1881 that regulates the display of advertisements in public spaces.

While flyposting is commonplace, it is often viewed as a nuisance by landlords and they can take civil action to protect their property rights. A particularly noteworthy incident of this type occurred in Boston, Massachusetts. In the case of the 2007 Boston Mooninite panic, advertisers had placed electronic signboards without notifying local authorities, prompting a costly reaction by the Boston Police Department bomb squad when the signs were mistaken for bombs.

== Web banner ==
With the rise of the World Wide Web, much of advertising has been shifted online. Some advertising agencies have drawn similarities between flyposting and certain types of adware, which are more invasive to consumers.

== See also ==
- Election litter
- Publicity
- Subvertising
