= Lawn sign =

Small advertising signs on a property facing a public area

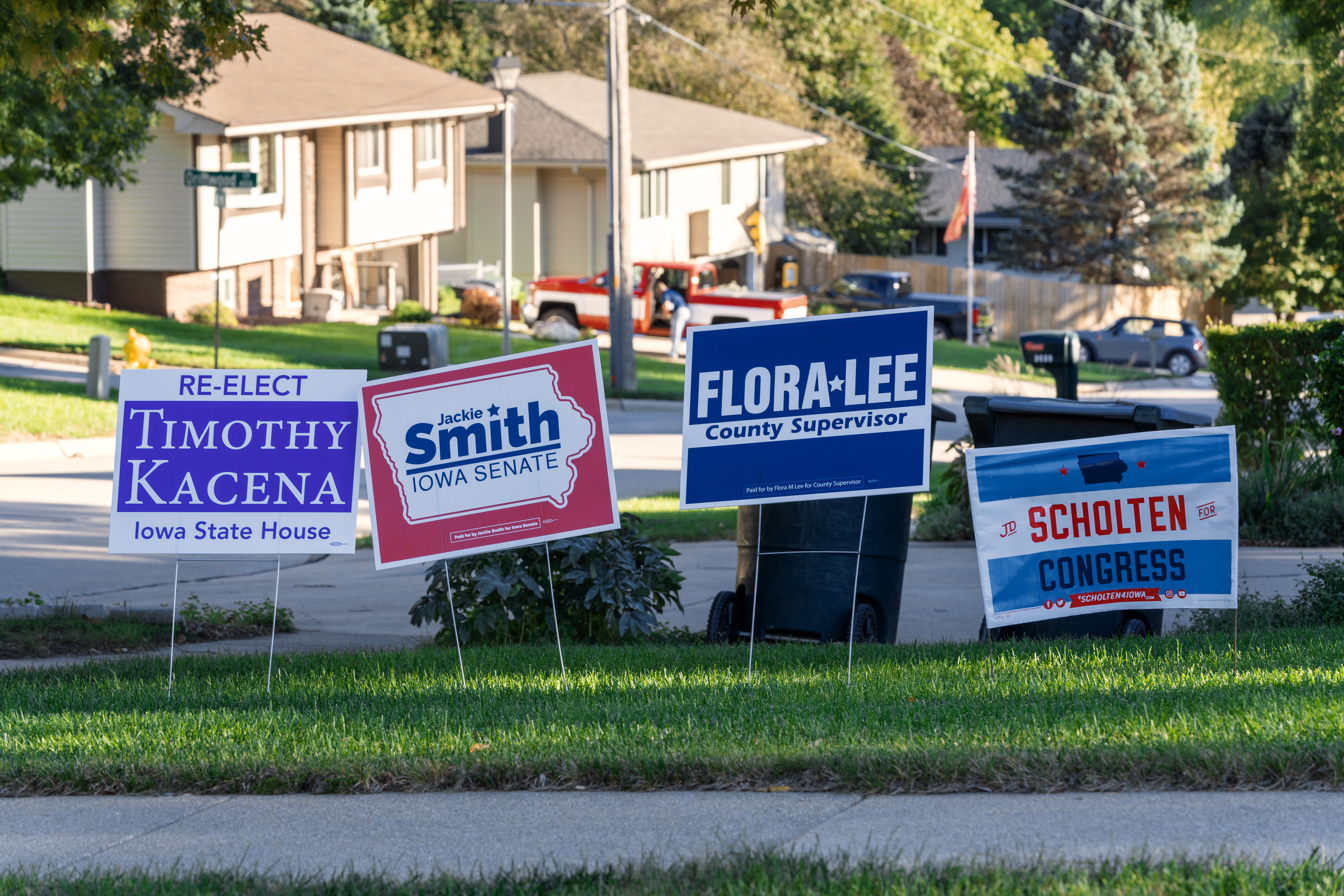
Political lawn signs in Sioux City, Iowa ahead of the 2018 United States elections

Lawn signs (also known as yard signs, bandit signs and placards, among other names) are small signs that can be placed on a street-facing lawn or elsewhere on a property to express the support for an election candidate, or political position, by the property owner (or sometimes to promote a business). They are popular in political campaigns in the United States and Canada.

== Placement ==
Lawn signs are often also placed near polling places on election day, although in most jurisdictions, there are legal restrictions on campaigning within a certain distance from a voting facility. In most states, there are also restrictions on where these signs can be placed. There are some residential areas that have ordinances prohibiting any posting of yard signs.

The signs are typically placed close to the road for greater visibility. In most highways a sign may not be erected so that the part of the sign face nearest a highway is within five feet of the highway's right of way line.

Signs come in various shapes and sizes, but are most often rectangular and between 12 and 40 inches on each side. They are usually produced in packages that include lawn sign wires since most of these lawn signs need to be placed on a grass or dirt surface.

== Types ==
=== H-frame ===
A common type of yard sign frame is the "H-frame". The wire frames usually have at least two tines that can be inserted into the flutes of corrugated plastic signs. The tines on the other end of the frame can be inserted into the ground. A single or double crossbar between the two tines adds strength and makes the entire frame one single unit. It also prevents the sign face from sliding down the tines.

=== I-frame ===
The I-frame is essentially an H-frame without a crossbar linking the two legs. Each leg may have an abutment that acts as a stop to prevent the sign from sliding down.

== Political importance ==
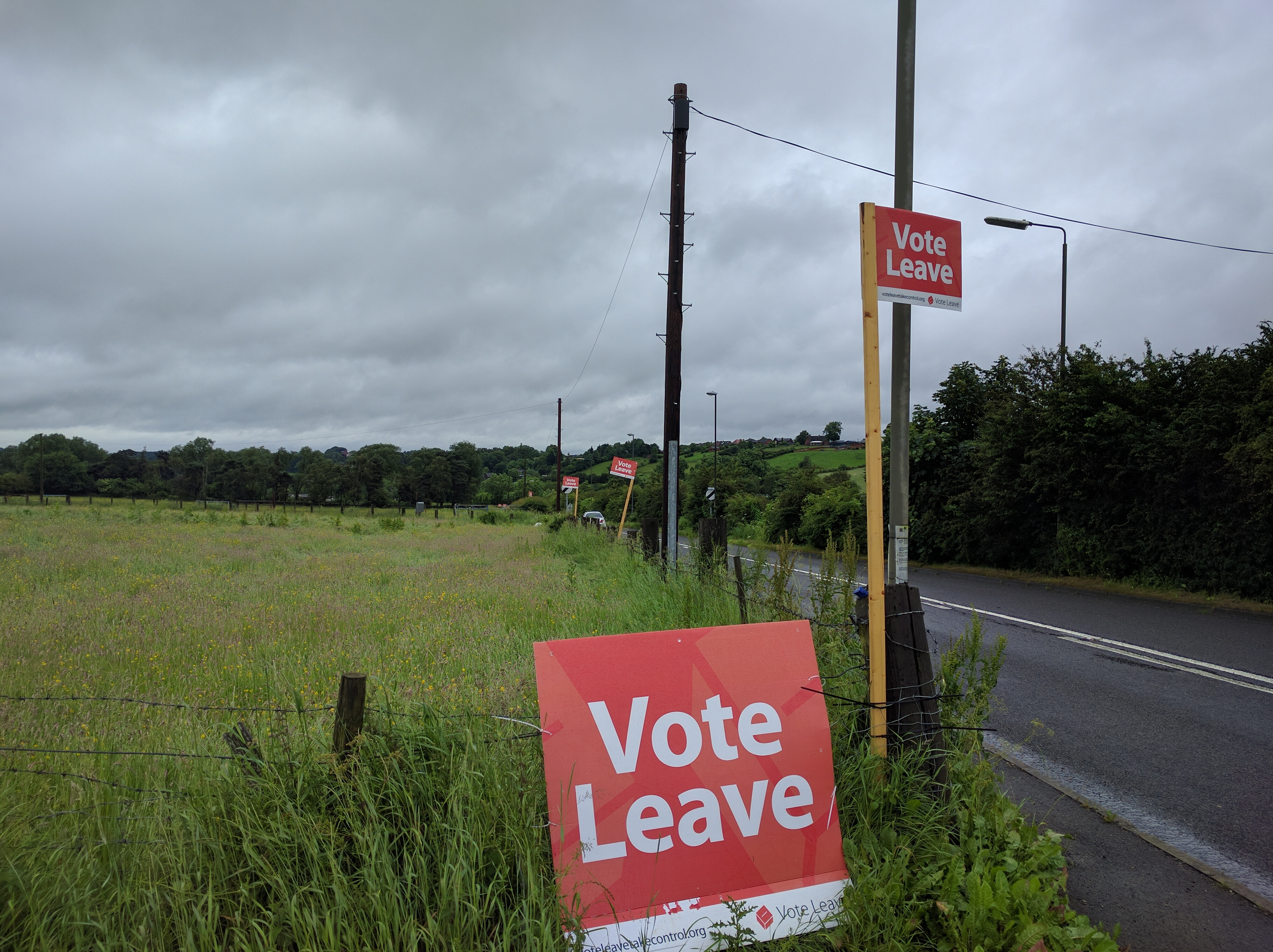
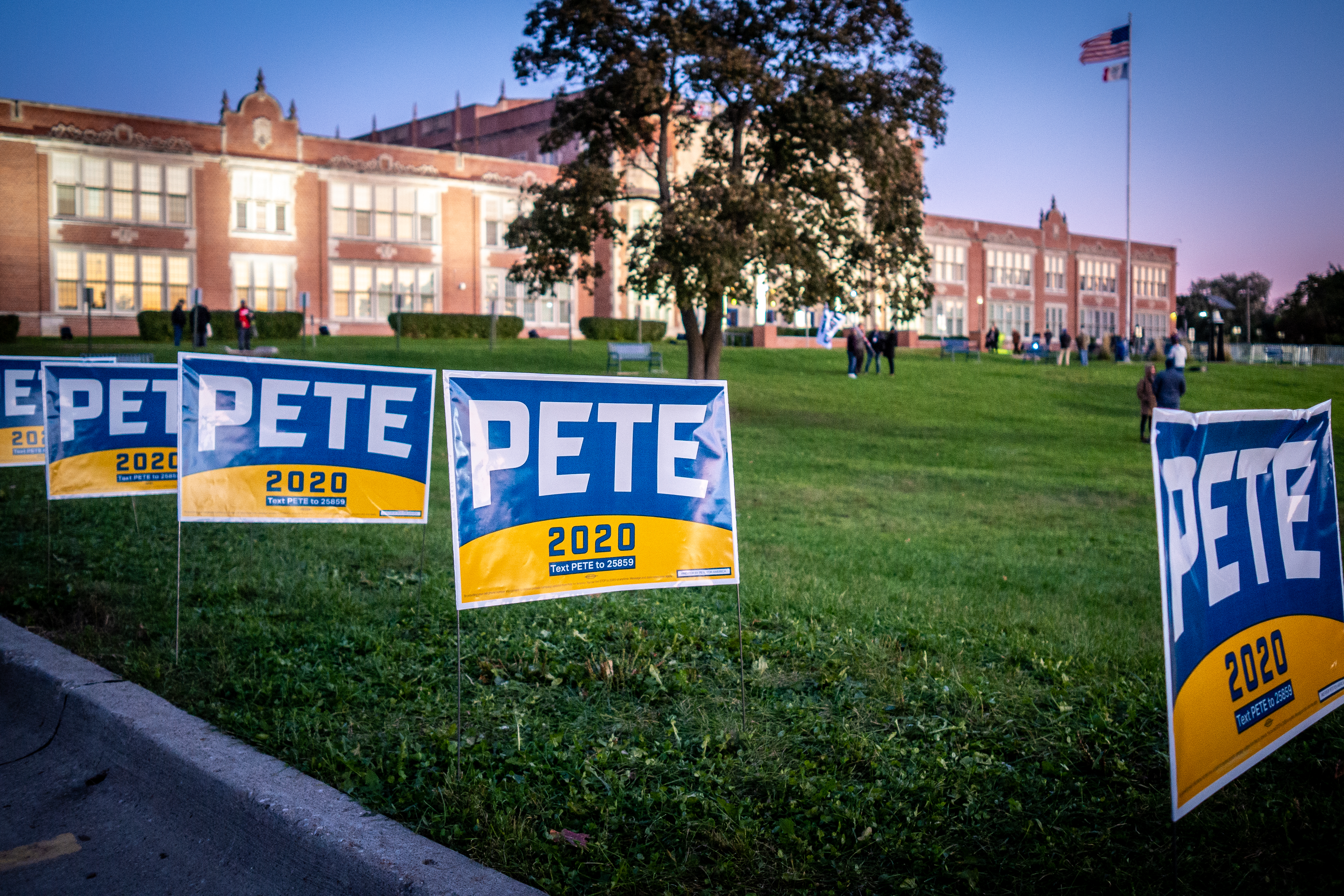
Top: Vote Leave signs during 2016 UK referendum on EU membership. Bottom: Signs supporting Pete Buttigieg for the 2020 Democratic Party presidential primaries

Political scientist Mel Kahn states that lawn signs help build name recognition for candidates. Supposedly, each sign represents 6–10 votes for the candidate. However, veteran political organizers hate the task of handing out yard signs, because they believe that time spent on procuring and distributing yard signs could be better used on other voter registration and get out the vote operations. One randomized field trial found yard signs simply reminding people to vote were able to significantly increase overall voter turnout. A 2016 study found that lawn signs raise vote shares by slightly more than 1 percentage point and are "on par with other low-tech campaign tactics such as direct mail that generate ... effects that tend to be small in magnitude".

In addition, it gives the requester a placebo effect of doing something substantive, while not actually volunteering to help their candidate. Critics charge that "lawn signs don't vote" and dismiss their importance.

In 2010, the Wall Street Journal reported on a then-new type of yard sign designed for improved effectiveness by being cut into shapes or people to deliver a political message. The article suggested that such signs could expose 25,000 drivers per day to messages at a low cost.

== Theft ==
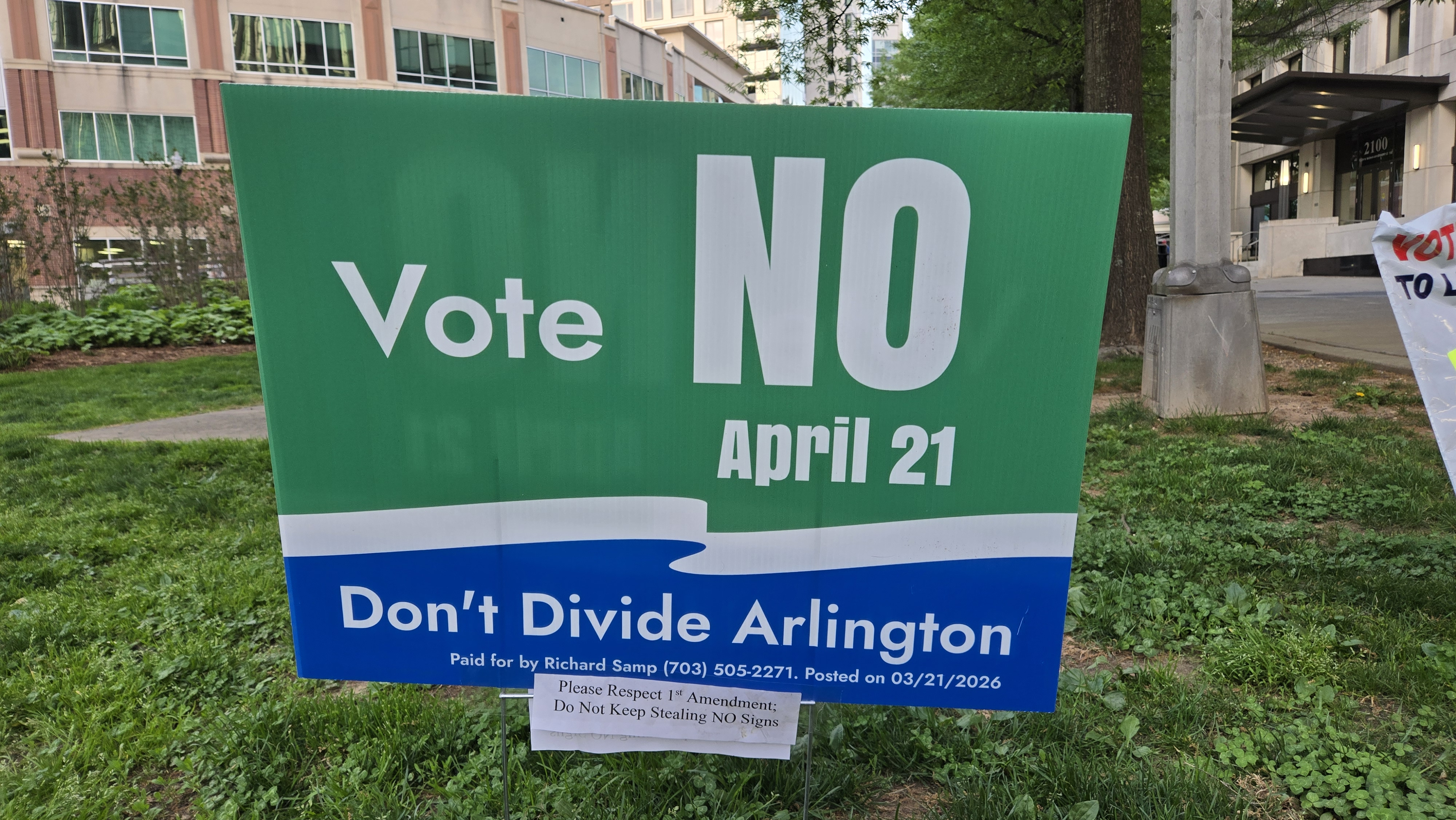
A "Vote No" sign for the 2026 Virginia redistricting referendum including an added note reading, "Please Respect 1st Amendment; Do Not Keep Stealing NO Signs"

Theft of lawn signs is illegal in all 50 U.S. states, though since there are no federal laws addressing it, the penalties in each state vary. Most states consider the crime a misdemeanor. Despite this, lawn sign theft is common in the United States, and technology such as doorbell cameras and tracking devices has been increasingly used to prevent it. Lawn sign theft is also illegal in Canada.

Signs on the rights of way in many states are considered litter and can be picked up by anyone as a public service. On several occasions, citizens who removed lawn signs on the pretext of cleaning up the clutter and eliminating driver distraction were arrested, sparking a public controversy.

== Freedom of speech issues in the United States ==
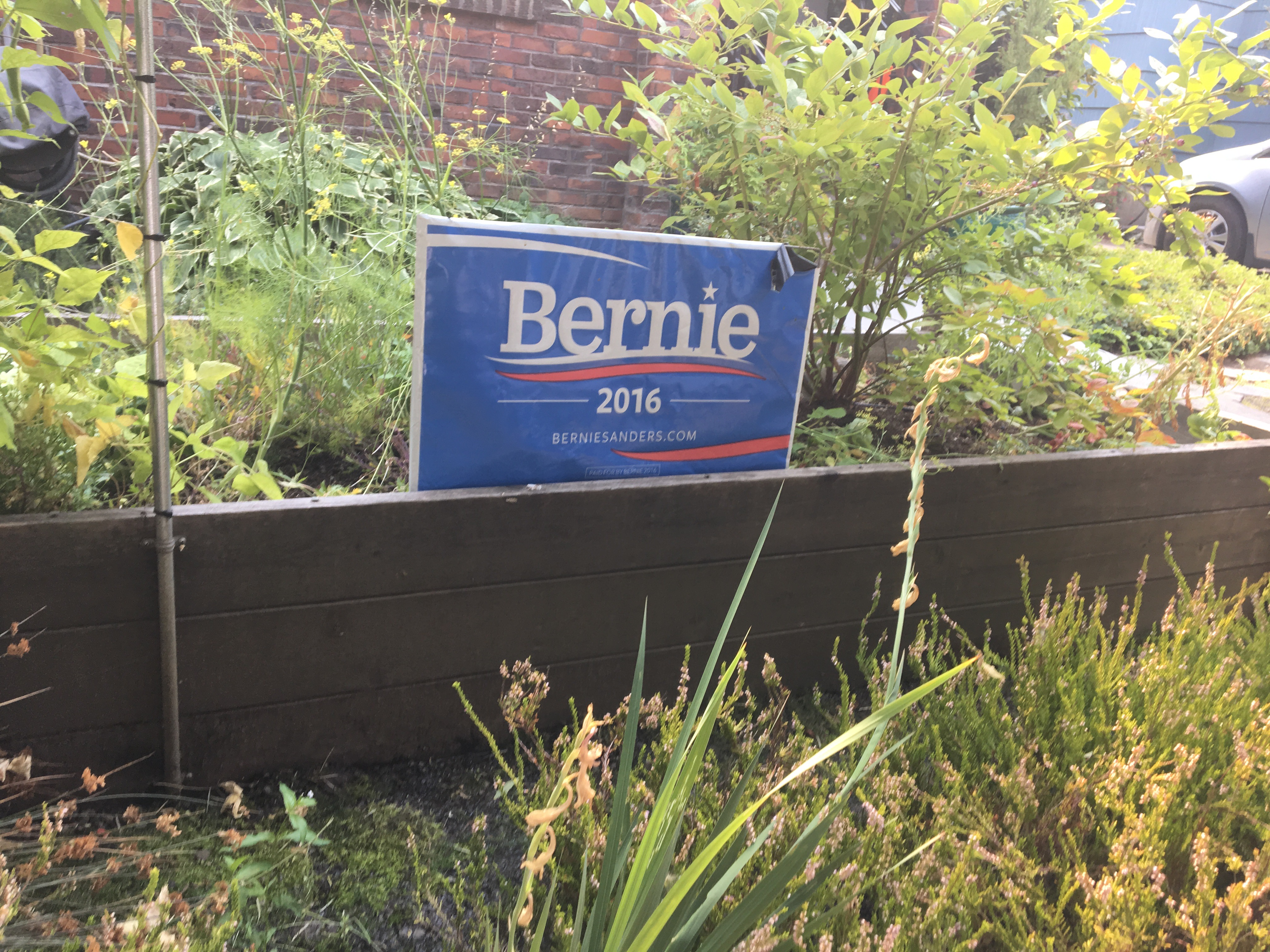
Lawn sign supporting Bernie Sanders' 2016 presidential campaign, left out for over a year after the election

=== Governments ===
In the last forty years, there have been two landmark cases from the Supreme Court of the United States on the topic of sign ordinances. In City of Ladue v. Gilleo (1994), a resident of Ladue, Missouri, sued the city after being told by city officials she had to remove a sign from her upstairs window protesting the Gulf War. The city banned most signs within city limits but allowed the placement of for-sale signs on the lawn. The Court struck down the ordinance and held that municipal ordinances aimed to reduce visual clutter through the regulation of yard signs were inviolate of the First Amendment to the United States Constitution if the ordinance restricted free speech and could not pass strict scrutiny. Passing strict scrutiny, which requires that the law be narrowly tailored to achieve a compelling government interest, is an incredibly difficult standard to meet. Under the standard, ordinances are presumed to be unconstitutional.

The second landmark decision by the Supreme Court was Reed v. Town of Gilbert (2015). In Reed, the Court reviewed the constitutionality of a sign ordinance in Gilbert, Arizona, which regulated the manner signs could be displayed in public areas. The ordinance banned the display of outdoor signs without a permit. However, the ordinance included over twenty categorical exemptions. For instance, "ideological" signs could be placed in the zoning district for an indeterminate amount of time and "political" signs were allowed in the district for up to 60 days before a primary election and up to 15 days following a general election. However, “temporary directional signs relating to a qualifying event", which directed "pedestrians, motorists, and other passersby" to events hosted by non-profit organizations, could only be displayed in the district twelve hours before the start of the event and had to be taken down an hour after the event. The size of the signs were also regulated depending on the category. The Court held that the signs were a content based regulation because it distinguished signs based on their topic. Under First Amendment jurisprudence, content based regulations receive strict scrutiny. The ordinance was struck down.

Despite these rulings, municipalities and state governments continue to pass unconstitutional sign ordinances which are periodically struck down by courts.

=== Residential associations ===
The yard sign protections laid out in Ladue and in Reed do not apply to many Americans because they live in a house or condominium with a restrictive covenant governed by a residential association. Such associations are legally considered private entities that are not governed by the First Amendment. Legal scholars have advocated for the associations to be considered state actors by the courts. Under the state action doctrine, if a private actor is delegated a public function by the state, the private actor is considered a state actor and therefore governed by the First Amendment. For a function to be a public function, it must be both traditionally and exclusively or near exclusively a state function. On the other hand, one scholar has argued that the associations are "of a private nature" because of the legal principles governing the whole arrangements. Such associations are created by "private initiative, private money, private property and private law concepts", thus the associations should be able to enforce any restrictive covenant banning political signs.

The states of California, Delaware, Nevada, New Jersey, Massachusetts, Ohio, and Wisconsin all protect the right of homeowners to display lawn signs and prohibit homeowners associations and similar organizations from regulating or banning them.

Kansas, North Carolina, Pennsylvania, and Virginia allow homeowners associations and similar organizations to limit or ban political lawn signs only if it is already written in the bylaws.

Arizona and Texas prohibit homeowners associations and similar organizations from banning lawn signs during or around an election.

== See also ==
- Sign war
