= Sign war =

A sign war is a competition between two or more organizations to gain the best visibility, or simply to engage in friendly "one-upmanship". The goal may be to put up more signs than one's competitors, or it may be to put up wittier signs.

== Business sign wars ==
Sign wars between local businesses may consist of good spirited jabs at one another. For example, a sign war in Christiansburg, Virginia in 2021 started when a local music store challenged their neighboring shoe store to a sign war. The good-hearted "war" spread across town and attracted national attention.

== Political campaigns ==
In politics, sign wars are competitions between opposing political campaigns at events and/or locations where campaign visibility is paramount to each side. During a sign war, campaign workers, both staffers and volunteers, seek to have a greater sign presence than their opposition. Sign wars may consist of tens of thousands of signs in standard sizes ranging from placards to 4'x8's and may include a wide variety of signs that have been improvised by campaigns and their volunteers.

=== Sign wars as a campaign tactic ===
Journalists frequently report on sign wars during the campaign season. Particularly for campaigns that aren't large enough to have a regular stream of polling data for the local news media to report on, journalists will use other numbers based metrics such as the number of yard signs for each candidate in the district to help gauge support for individual candidates.

Candidates and campaign staff often stoke the fires of election sign wars to claim that their candidate has popular support among the voters in the district.

=== Notable political sign wars ===
A notable sign war occurs during the popular Shad Planking in Wakefield, Virginia. Every April, locals and politicians from all around the Commonwealth gather for some politicking, beer drinking, and fish eating.

Nationally, in August 2007, Democratic presidential hopefuls John Edwards and Barack Obama each claimed victory for his side in the sign war that occurred at Drake University in Des Moines, Iowa. Probably one of the most famous sign wars occurs every presidential election year at the Jefferson Jackson dinner in Des Moines Iowa.

== Sources ==
- "Shad Planking sparks candidates, sign wars". archive.is.
- "Iowa Independent:: John Edwards Declares Sign War Victory, As Does Obama Campaign". October 11, 2007. Archived from the original on October 11, 2007.
- "At Shad Planking, Traditional Roast Of Va. Politicians (washingtonpost.com)". www.washingtonpost.com.
- "Lawn & Yard Signs for Cheap". VictoryStore.com.
