= Isabel Brown (American activist) =

American political activist (born 1997)

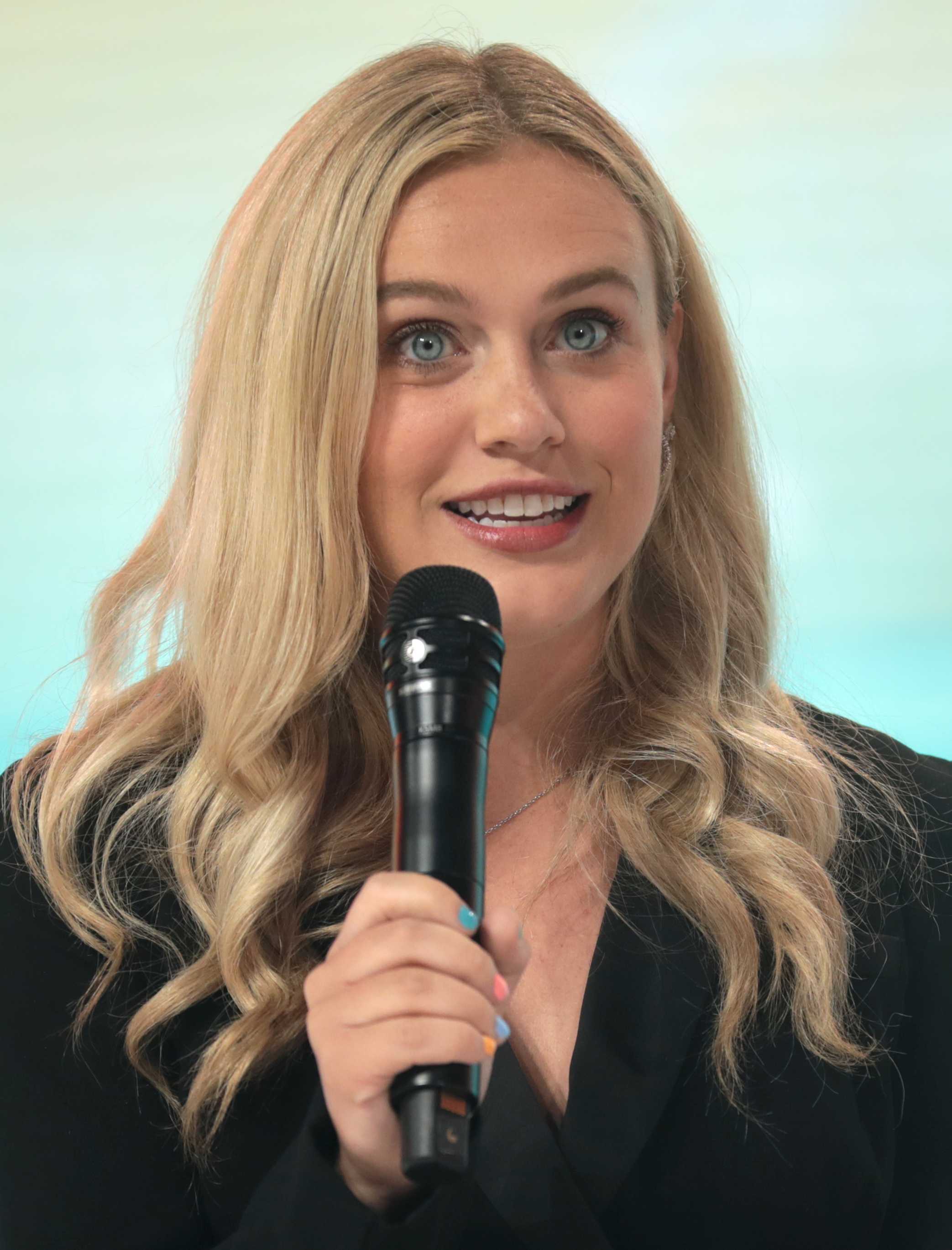
- Brown in 2021
- Born: May 27, 1997 (age 29); Boise, Idaho, U.S.
- Education: Georgetown University (MS) Colorado State University (BS)
- Occupations: Political activist; media personality; author; spokesperson
- Years active: 2017–present
- Notable work: Books; The Isabel Brown Show
- Political party: Republican
- Movement: Conservatism
- Spouse: Brock Belcher (m. 2024)
- Children: 1

YouTube information
- Channel: Isabel Brown
- Years active: 2012–present
- Genre: Politics
- Subscribers: 179 thousand
- Views: 33.2 million
- Last updated: August 23, 2026

Isabel Brown (born May 27, 1997) is an American right-wing political activist, media personality, political commentator, and author. She hosts The Isabel Brown Show with Matt Fradd on The Daily Wire. Born in Boise, Idaho, Brown became active in politics during her years as a college student at Colorado State University, where she would use the college's campus to promote her student activism. While in college she became affiliated with the conservative organization Turning Point USA, a non-profit conservative organization founded by Charlie Kirk, whom Brown later became close friends with up until his assassination in September 2025.

Brown was a student chapter president for Turning Point USA before switching to a spokesperson. One of her focal positions is to encourage Americans to marry and have children early in life. Brown has written two books, The End of the Alphabet: How Gen Z Can Save America and Frontlines: Finding My Voice on an American College Campus. As of 2026, she is married to Brock Belcher and has one child; she is also a spokesperson for Turning Point USA.

== Early life and education ==
Brown was born and grew up in Boise, Idaho, and worked at the United States Senate and the White House. Brown earned her Bachelor of Science in biomedical sciences from Colorado State University; she later got her Master of Science in biomedical sciences policy and advocacy from Georgetown University.

== Career ==
=== Activism ===
Brown started her career as a college student through politics and student activism on her college campus at Colorado State University. While at college, Brown became involved with the conservative non-profit organization Turning Point USA. From this involvement, she participated in and focused on campus events, political debates, and discussions and issues in America such as free speech, education policy, and ideological diversity. Before transitioning to a spokesperson, she was a student chapter president for Turning Point USA.

Her role in student activism earned her early visibility within conservative Gen-Z communities as she took part in organizing and speaking at politically related events, a lot of the time debating with Gen-Zs, which helped her recognition beyond just her university environment. In September of 2025, days after the assassination of Charlie Kirk, Brown spoke on the topic of the future of Kirk's company, Turning Point USA; she stated that she "vows to bring Kirk's TPUSA to a generation".

Brown recorded a video addressing Kirk's death, she said in the video that she believes it was "a far-right activist and organiser", also saying that it was "the hardest day of my life", she also praised Kirk as a "mentor and friend of the past eight years". In April 2026, Meta threw a "Save the West" party for Brown to celebrate her milestone on their platforms. Brown was listed as number four with a weighted score of 78.1 to become the "next Charlie Kirk" by Newsweek; she was on the list with Alex Clark, Brett Cooper, Riley Gaines, and Amala Ekpunobi.

=== Media ===
In later years, Brown transitioned into media commentary, rooting from her activism, which led to appearances and interviews with news companies, such as being one of the main guests on the CNN election night live cast.

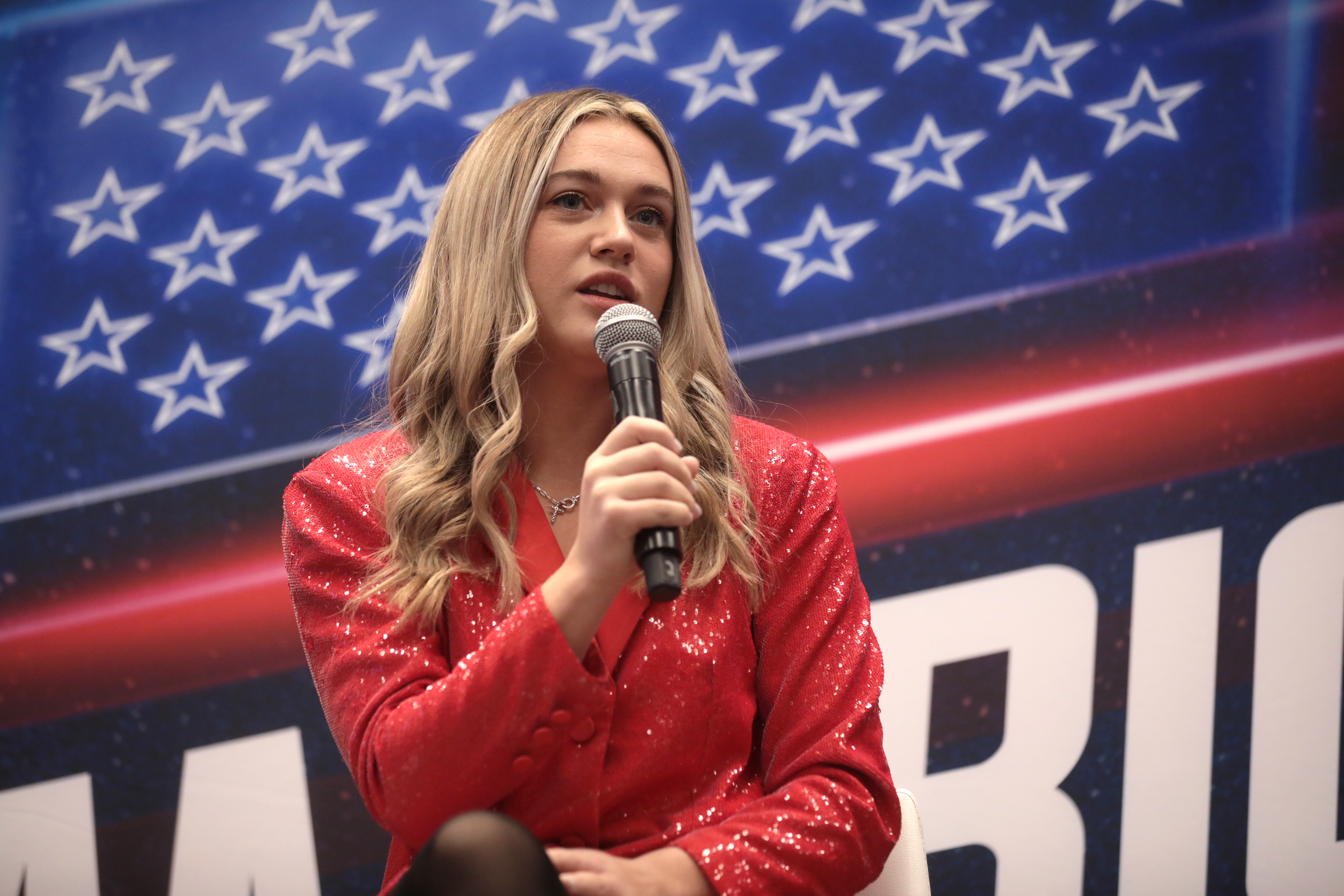
Brown speaking with attendees at the 2022 AmericaFest at the Phoenix Convention Center in Phoenix, Arizona.

During this period, she began producing her own commentary content on social media platforms, focusing on cultural and political topics. Her content discusses the same problems that she focuses on in her activism career. As her online following grew, Brown began appearing more frequently in other conservative content. This included guest appearances, panel discussions, and collaborations with media organizations, such as The Daily Wire. In 2023, Brown started The Isabel Brown Show, hosted by herself and Australian-American author, podcaster, and Catholic motivational speaker Matt Fradd; the show initially grew on independent platforms and later relaunched on The Daily Wire.

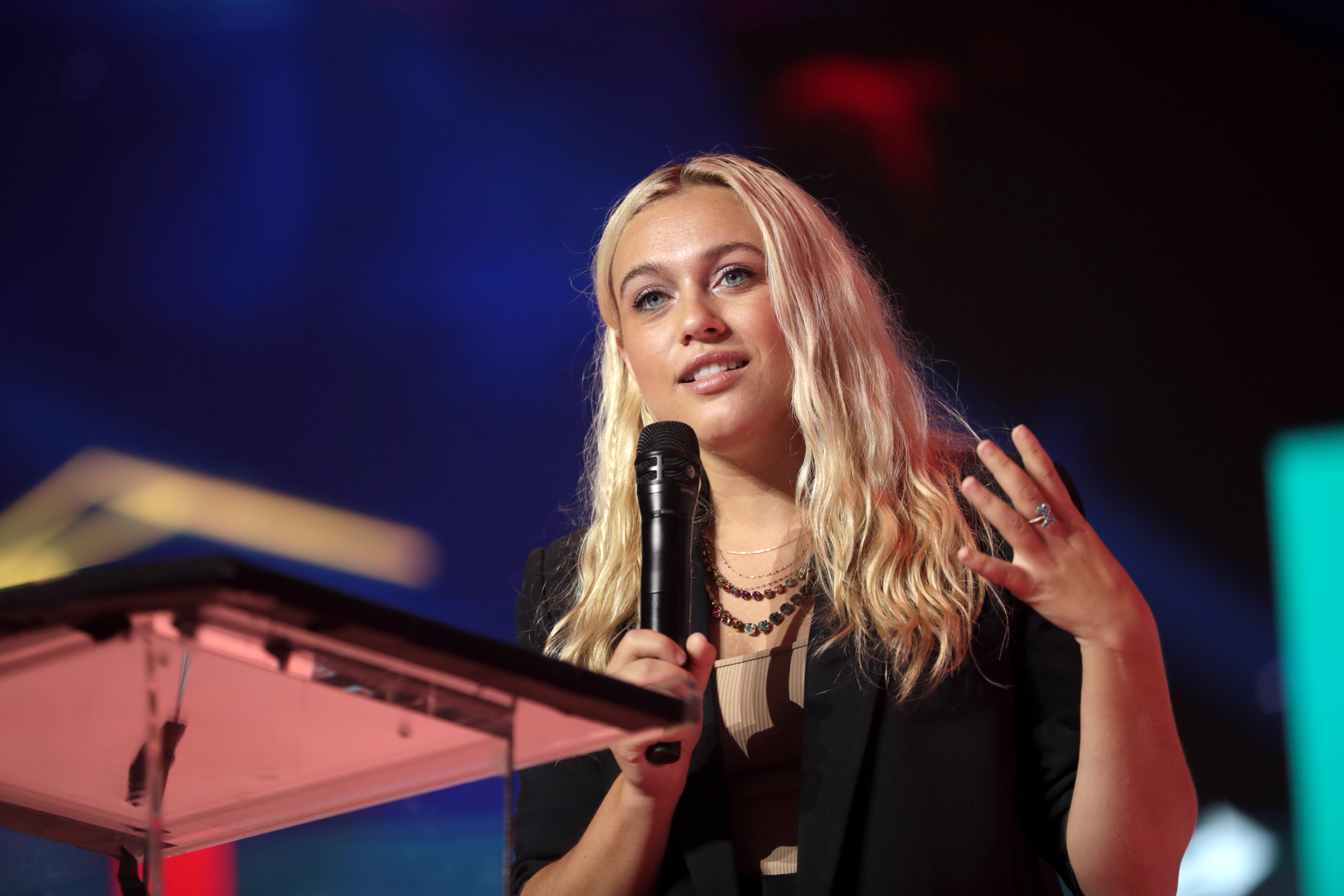
Brown speaking with attendees at the 2022 Student Action Summit at the Tampa Convention Center in Tampa, Florida.

In March 2026, The View, an American daytime talk show, criticized Brown for her comments made during an appearance at the Conservative Political Action Conference (CPAC) encouraging young Americans to marry and have children early in life. A clip of Brown saying people should have “more kids than they can afford before they think they’re ready” got backlash online.

The clip was talked about by co-hosts Whoopi Goldberg and Ana Navarro, who criticized Brown's beliefs as irresponsible and dismissive of financial problems facing most families. Brown later said that her comments were taken out of context and that she was promoting family life and parenthood.

== Political views ==
Brown is a conservative right-wing political activist and a pro-family advocate. In May of 2025, she spoke at a university about "the feminist lie" and said she believes women can make lifestyle choices without long-term consequences. In August 2026, Brown did an interview with Fox News where she said, "Middle America is the "hotspot" for marriage."

== Personal life ==
Brown has been married to Brock Belcher since June 2024, with whom she has a child.

== Bibliography ==
- Brown, Isabel (2021). Frontlines: Finding My Voice on an American College Campus. Houndstooth Press. ISBN 9781544519296.
- Brown, Isabel; Rubin, Dave (2024). The End of the Alphabet: How Gen Z Can Save America. Nashville: Center Street. ISBN 978-1-5460-0625-1.

== See also ==
- Turning Point Action – U.S. conservative advocacy group
