= Lauren Banall =

American drag queen

- Born: Utah
- Occupations: Drag queen; Activist

Lauren Banall, also known as Erika Qwerk, is the stage name of an American drag queen, comedian, and political activist. She is best known for her parody of conservative CEO Erika Kirk.

== Biography ==
She was born and raised in a small farming town in Utah, and grew up in community theater. She later moved to Los Angeles, where she began her career in drag and has since remained. She took the drag name Lauren Banall. She has stated that this was partially in honor of actress Lauren Bacall and because at that time Banall felt she was thought of as unoriginal.

In 2021, she performed for Free Britney protests. In 2023, a drag brunch she performed at was attended by actress Halle Berry.

She first went viral in January 2026 after she released two videos meant to satirize conservative activist Erika Kirk. In a third video, she revealed this persona's name as Erika Qwerk. In this persona, Banall wears a red blazer, a blonde wig, and blue contacts that have been described as "eye-bulging". Her skits frequently incorporate elements such as sparklers and fake tears, and have been inspired by various public appearances of Kirk, such as the Turning Point USA conference after the Assassination of Charlie Kirk. All of her skits utilize the exact words of Kirk.

She has stated she created the persona out of feeling "helpless and gaslit". She has cited one of her inspirations for doing this is what she has described as Kirk's "icy stare". She has utilized this persona to fundraise for the American Civil Liberties Union; as of January 21, 2026, she had raised over three thousand dollars.

In April 2026, she performed as Erika Qwerk at a drag show named Turning Point U.S.GAY at gay nightclub Three Dollar Bill in New York City. She was an opening act. This show raised over twenty-five thousand dollars for the ACLU.

Her performances as Erika Qwerk gained positive attention across social media. However, she also garnered criticism from conservative individuals and groups including Fox News and Libs of TikTok.
