= Memorial service of Charlie Kirk =

2025 funeral of American political activist

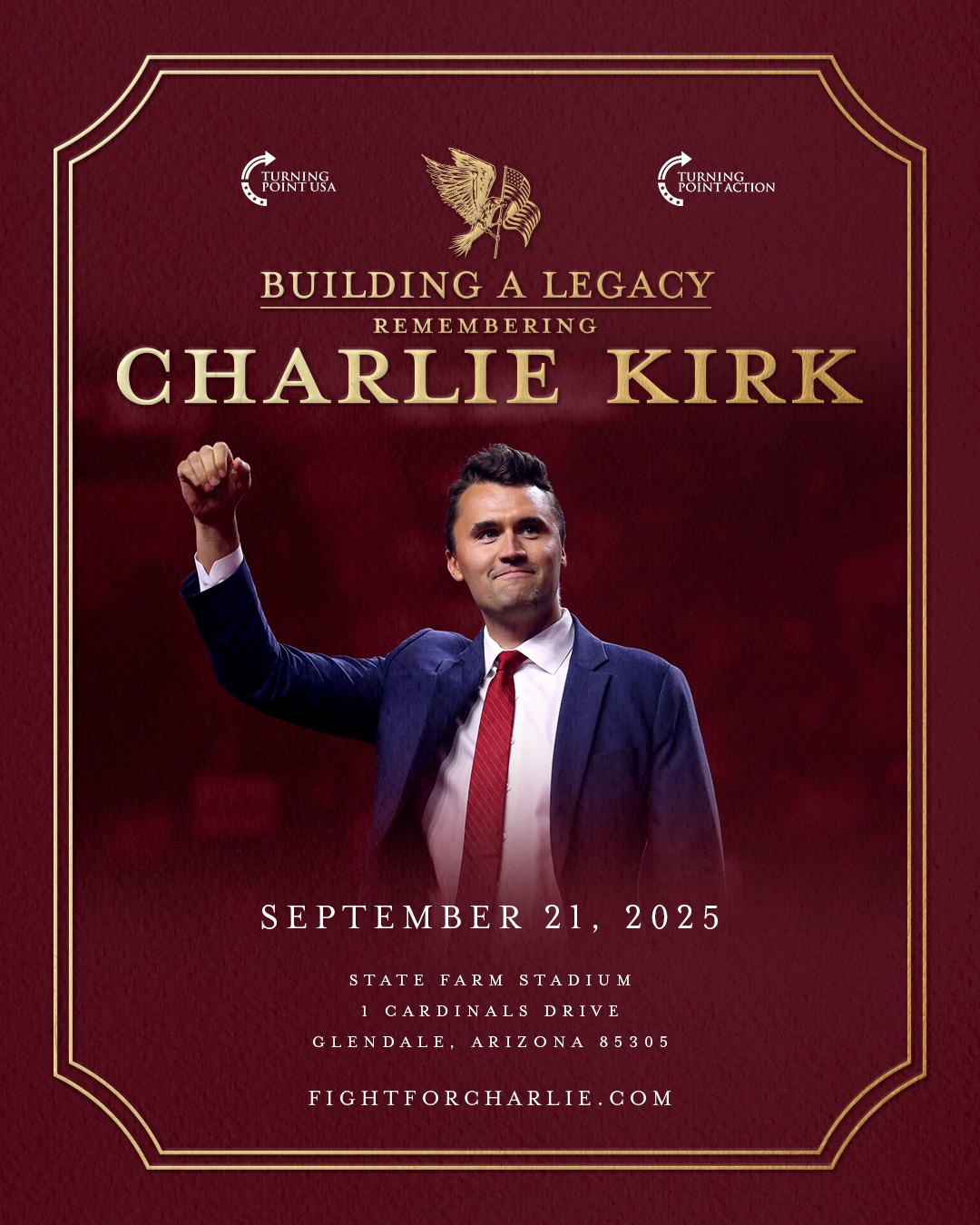
- Poster used for the memorial service
- Date: September 21, 2025
- Time: 11:00 a.m. (MST; UTC−06:00)
- Venue: State Farm Stadium and Desert Diamond Arena, Glendale, Arizona, U.S.
- Organized by: Turning Point USA; Turning Point Action
- Participants: 100,000+ people

On September 21, 2025, the memorial service for American political activist Charlie Kirk, who had been assassinated on September 10 at Utah Valley University, was held at State Farm Stadium in Glendale, Arizona, United States. On September 11, his casket was transported by Air Force Two to Phoenix, Arizona, the headquarters of Turning Point USA, the conservative student organization he co-founded and led until his death. On September 13, Turning Point USA announced plans for the memorial service, which attracted over 100,000 attendees. Overflow of the stadium led to planners sending attendees to Desert Diamond Arena one block north, which has a capacity of 20,000.

The memorial service featured over two dozen speakers, including political commentator Tucker Carlson, White House Deputy Chief of Staff Stephen Miller, Secretary of State Marco Rubio, Defense Secretary Pete Hegseth, Health Secretary Robert F. Kennedy Jr., Vice President JD Vance, and President Donald Trump. Businessman and entrepreneur Elon Musk attended the service. During her address, Erika Kirk stated that she forgave the man accused of assassinating her husband.

== Background ==
On September 10, 2025, Kirk was assassinated while addressing an audience on the campus of Utah Valley University (UVU) in Orem, Utah. The outdoor event was the first stop of the season for the American Comeback Tour, a speaking and debate series planned by Turning Point USA, a conservative organization he co-founded. On September 11, Kirk's casket, accompanied by U.S. vice president JD Vance, Second Lady Usha Vance, and Kirk's widow Erika Kirk, was flown on Air Force Two from Salt Lake City, Utah, to Phoenix, Arizona, where Turning Point USA's headquarters are located and close to where the Kirk family lived. Kirk's casket was then taken by hearse to Hansen Mortuary Chapel in Phoenix, under a police escort.

== Planning ==
On September 13, Turning Point USA announced plans for Kirk's memorial service. The service took place on September 21 at State Farm Stadium in Glendale, Arizona, and was attended by Erika, President Donald Trump, Vice President JD Vance, and Elon Musk, among others. Turning Point USA reportedly covered the cost of renting the stadium, while city workers such as sanitation and the Glendale Police force had their overtime covered by the city's budget. Mosaic Pro Events were tasked by Turning Point USA to design and produce the memorial at the State Farm Stadium, which reportedly used 37 semi-trucks, and hundreds of crews, vendors and other partners.

The Glendale Police Department anticipated that more than 100,000 people would attend the memorial service. Turning Point USA required those who planned to attend to register, requiring a full name, email address, phone number, and ZIP code. Attendees were directed by Turning Point USA to not wear funeral black to the service, but to instead wear their Sunday best or anything patriotic following a red, white and blue theme.

Security was led by the U.S. Secret Service, and the U.S. Department of Homeland Security designated the service as a "Special Event Assessment Rating Level 1 event", which has been given to other large events such as the Super Bowl and the Boston Marathon. Federal law enforcement agencies announced prior to the service that they were tracking several threats of unknown credibility against attendees. On September 20, an armed man was arrested by the Secret Service at State Farm Stadium and charged with police impersonation. It was later announced by Turning Point USA that the man was doing advanced security screening for a known guest that was not properly coordinated with the Secret Service or Turning Point.

== Ceremony ==
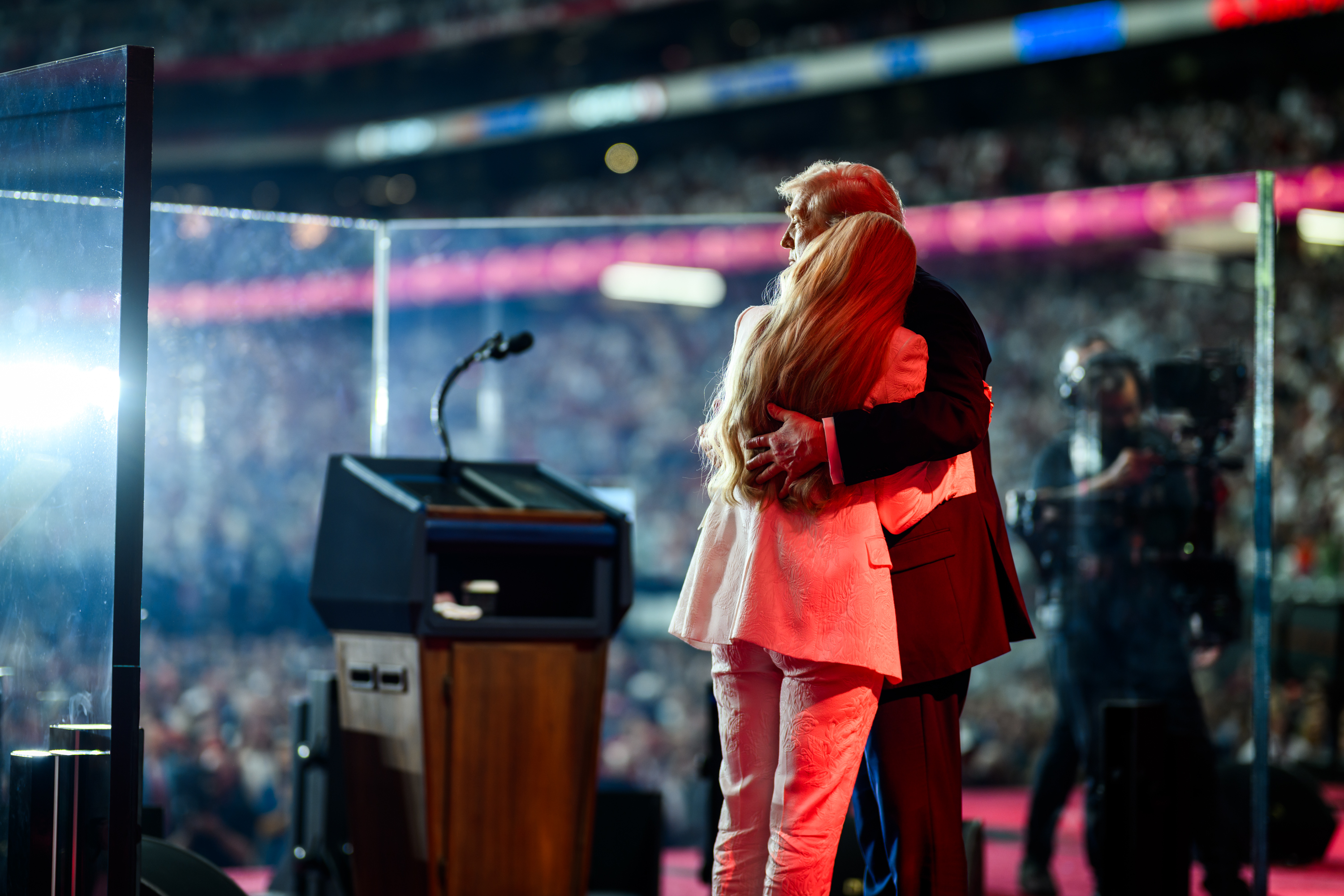
Erika Kirk and Donald Trump, surrounded by panels of bulletproof glass, wave to the crowd at State Farm Stadium

Prior to the service, hours of contemporary Christian music were played for the crowd, with many standing holding their arms up in worship. Singers such as Brandon Lake, Chris Tomlin, Phil Wickham, Kari Jobe, Cody Carnes, and Lee Greenwood all performed during the service for attendees. The event was described as an evangelical revival blending religion and politics, with its size, intensity and patriotic pageantry invoking a Trump campaign rally on a larger scale. During the service there were multiple calls from attendees for assistance, which the majority were categorized as people feeling dizzy or fainting due to dehydration, heat and lack of sleep.

Trump sat next to Elon Musk at the memorial, in their first public meeting since the beginning of their feud earlier in the year. Kirk was a friend of both, and had publicly called for their reconciliation. There were more than two dozen speeches planned for the memorial service, including Erika, Vance, White House Deputy Chief of Staff Stephen Miller, and Secretary of State Marco Rubio, with Trump scheduled to be the last speaker. Fireworks went off as Erika Kirk and President Trump came to speak. During her speech, Erika said she forgave Tyler Robinson, the man accused of murdering Charlie Kirk. The speeches were displayed on two giant electronic screens with U.S. flags posted on either side.

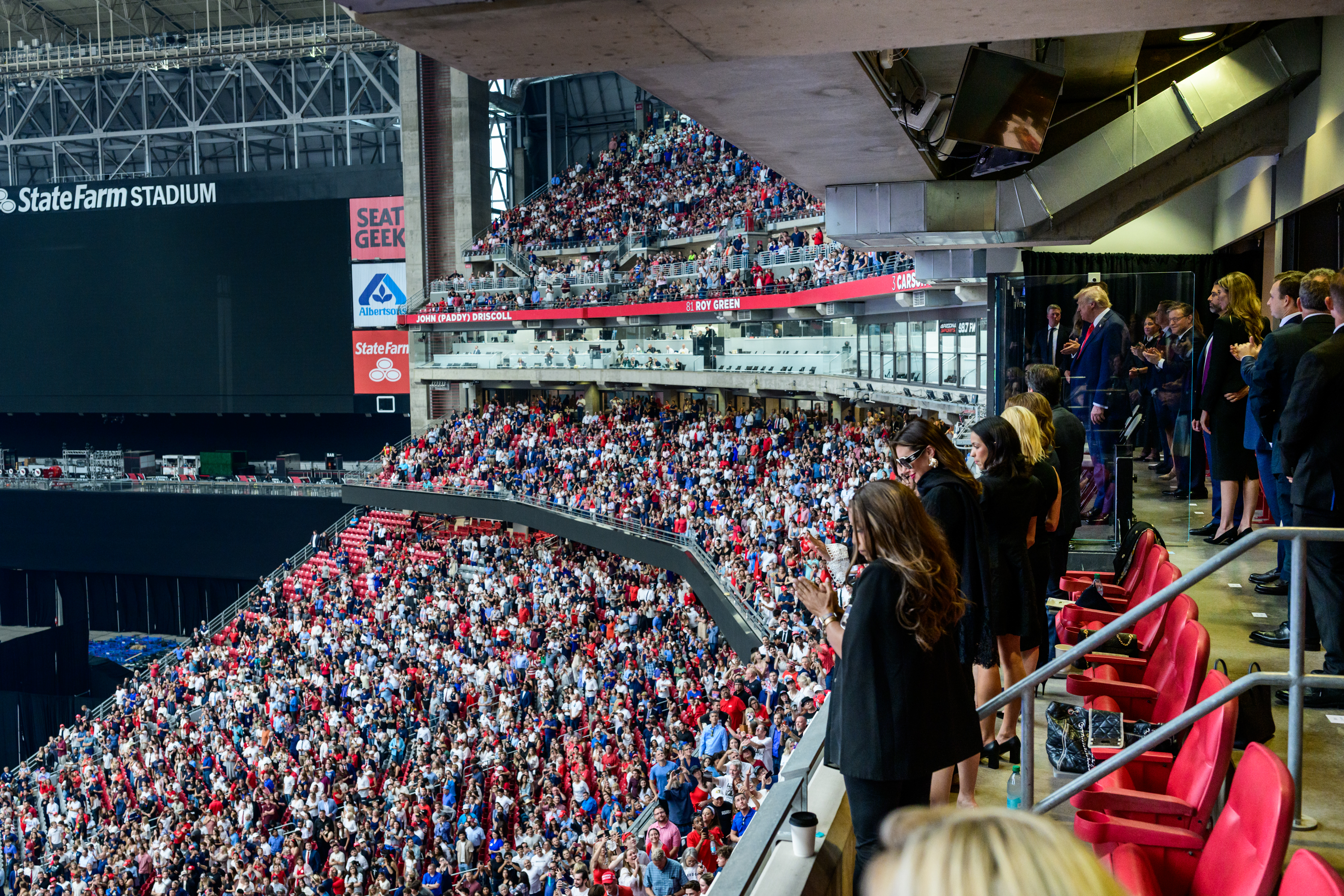
The crowd at the memorial service

Many of the speeches said that Kirk had become a martyr, with conservative commentator Benny Johnson stating "his power will only grow", and Trump saying that Kirk had died for American freedom; Defense Secretary Pete Hegseth stated that Kirk was a warrior for both the United States and Christ, and died speaking the truth. In his eulogy, Robert F. Kennedy Jr. praised Kirk as a champion of free speech.

Miller used religious and combative language during his speech, claiming that Kirk's "army" had risen due to his death and that they would prove worthy of his sacrifice. Miller also espoused the idea, that Trump and others had pushed shortly after Kirk's death, that an unnamed terrorist network was responsible for the shooting, while stating, "We are on the side of goodness. We are on the side of God".

Trump's speech focused on pointing the blame of Kirk's death on the left and the Democratic Party, while acknowledging a litany of problems affecting the country across party lines. He argued that "the violence largely comes from the left", making his speech more partisan than other speakers. He also referred to Erika's prior statement of not meeting hate with hate, stating: "[Charlie] did not hate his opponents. He wanted the best for them. That's where I disagreed with Charlie. I hate my opponent, and I don't want the best for them. I'm sorry. I'm sorry, Erika. But now Erika can talk to me and the whole group, and maybe they can convince me that that's not right, but I can't stand my opponent." Trump also teased an announcement regarding autism would occur the next day, falsely claiming "I think we found an answer to autism."

== Analysis ==
Trump (left) with Kirk's widow, Erika Kirk

The service has been described as a political rally and Christian revival with calls for both forgiveness and retribution. Many noted the religious theming of the service, with a reporter from BBC News indicating that the decorations and theming were like evangelist Billy Graham's tent crusade from early in his career. Those speaking at the event also celebrated Kirk's Christianity while promising a new enthusiasm among young Americans for more traditional evangelical values. In an analysis for CNN, Zachary Wolf expressed concerns about Christian nationalism and the move away from the separation of church and state due to the heavy religious invoking by top Trump administration members.

Others felt that the political unity shown by top Republicans speaking in honor of Kirk may unify and fortify the Trump administration and the Republican Party. Some commentators felt that the service showed how the loss of Kirk and his ability to unify many under Trump and Republican and conservative values would be missed, while also showcasing those that may step into political power after Trump. The editor of Reason magazine claimed that the memorial showed the collapse of Trump's popularity as he was allegedly overshadowed by speakers such as Tucker Carlson and Stephen Miller.

== See also ==
- Reprisals against commentators on the Charlie Kirk assassination
