= Bill Montgomery (activist) =

American businessman and political activist (1940–2020)

- Montgomery c. 2010s
- Born: May 29, 1940; Lincoln, Nebraska, U.S.
- Died: July 28, 2020 (aged 80)
- Occupations: Businessman; activist
- Organizations: Turning Point USA
- Known for: Charlie Kirk's mentor and co-founder of Turning Point USA
- Political party: Republican
- Movement: Conservatism

William Thomas Montgomery (May 29, 1940 – July 28, 2020) was an American businessman and conservative political activist. In 2012, he cofounded the conservative political organization Turning Point USA (TPUSA) alongside Charlie Kirk; Montgomery became Kirk's mentor and worked behind the scenes during the organization's early formation. He died due to complications from COVID-19.

== Early life ==
Montgomery was born on May 29, 1940, in Lincoln, Nebraska, and grew up in Peoria, Illinois. He served in the United States Air Force Reserve.

== Career and activism ==
Throughout his career, Montgomery worked as a business consultant, marketer, publisher, and restaurateur. After retiring, he founded Turning Point USA with Charlie Kirk in 2012. He was on Turning Point's board and its secretary and treasurer until spring 2019. Montgomery met Kirk when the latter was 18, after hearing Kirk speak at Benedictine University, at which Montgomery encouraged Kirk to pursue conservative activism. Montgomery has been described as Kirk's mentor, including by advising him to start Turning Point USA rather than attend college. Montgomery also provided the initial funding for the group.

== Personal life and death ==
Montgomery was married to Edie Montgomery, with whom he had a son and daughter. He died on July 28, 2020, aged 80, due to complications from COVID-19. Charlie Kirk called him a "dear friend" whose contributions shaped a generation of conservative activists. Turning Point USA honored Montgomery as an "iconic" figure whose "steadfast devotion" built the organization.
