= AmericaFest =

Annual American conservative convention

- Nickname: AMFEST
- Date: December (typically from December 18–21)
- Frequency: Annually
- Venue: Phoenix Convention Center
- Location: Phoenix, Arizona (2025)
- Country: United States
- Years active: 2021–present
- Inaugurated: December 18–21, 2021
- Founder: Charlie Kirk
- Most recent: December 18–21, 2025
- Previous event: AmericaFest 2025
- Next event: AmericaFest 2026
- Organiser: Turning Point USA
- People: Charlie Kirk, Erika Kirk
- Website: amfest.com

AmericaFest, also known as AMFEST, is an annual convention of Turning Point USA. AmericaFest started in 2021, and featured Donald Trump in 2024. It has featured a number of notable speakers including Erika Kirk, Nicki Minaj, Ben Shapiro, Megyn Kelly, Tucker Carlson, Steve Bannon, Russell Brand, JD Vance, Vivek Ramaswamy, and Robert F. Kennedy Jr.

== AmericaFest 2021 ==
AmericaFest 2021 was held at the Phoenix Convention Center in Arizona from December 18 to December 21, 2021. It was designed as a conservative political and cultural gathering that mixed speeches, activism, media personalities, music performances, and networking events.

AmericaFest 2021 featured many high-profile conservative figures, including: Donald Trump Jr., Tucker Carlson, Sarah Palin, Candace Owens, Kayleigh McEnany, and Pete Hegseth.

One of the most widely discussed moments from the event involved Kyle Rittenhouse, who had recently been acquitted in the Kenosha shootings trial just one month earlier. Rittenhouse received a standing ovation during his appearance and participated in discussions about the case and media coverage surrounding it.

== AmericaFest 2022 ==
AmericaFest 2022 was the second annual AmericaFest conference. it took place from December 17 to December 20, 2022 at the Phoenix Convention Center in Arizona.

The conference brought in 11,000 attendees and included a range of conservative figures, media personalities, and elected officials including Tucker Carlson, Donald Trump Jr., Steve Bannon, Candace Owens, Kari Lake, Matt Gaetz, and others.

== AmericaFest 2023 ==
AmericaFest 2023 was the third annual AmericaFest conference hosted by Turning Point USA at the Phoenix Convention Center in December 2023. Speakers included Roseanne Barr, Glenn Beck, Kari Lake, Ted Cruz, James O'Keefe, Dennis Prager, Vivek Ramaswamy, and others.

== AmericaFest 2024 ==
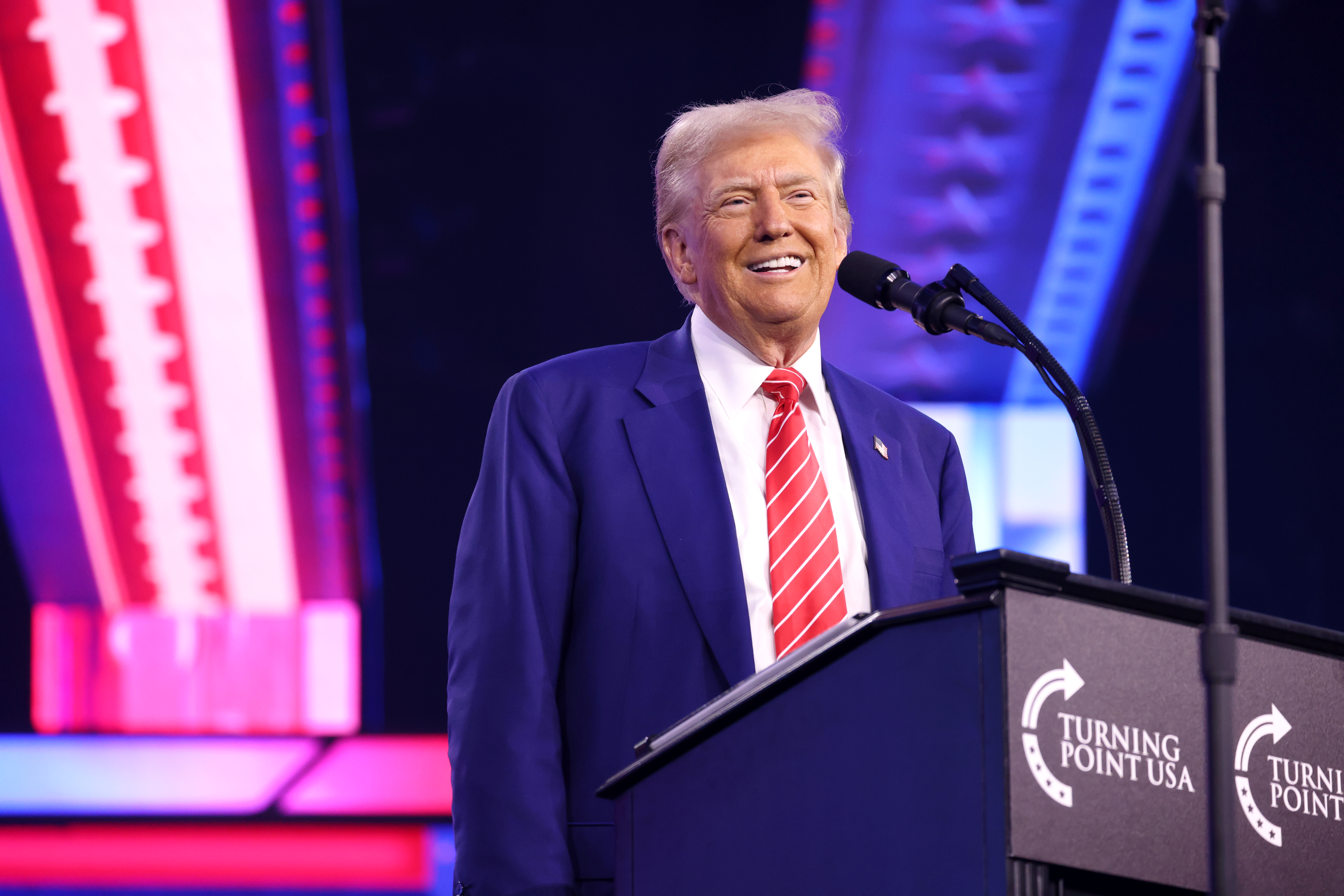
President-elect Donald Trump at the 2024 AmericaFest event

AmericaFest 2024 was held in Phoenix, Arizona, from December 19 to December 22, 2024. Donald Trump, who was then the President-elect, spoke at the event. Trump spoke about his support of the U.S. regaining the control over the Panama Canal, and the potential U.S. ban on TikTok. He also claimed that America is entering its Golden Age, and that on the first day of his presidency, he wanted to cancel the natural gas export ban, drill for more oil, reduce taxes, have it be official U.S. policy that there are only two genders (which was met with loud cheering), prevent a potential Third World War, and bring peace to the Middle East and Eastern Europe. He further said "The people have given us their trust, and in return, we're going to give them the best Day One, the biggest first week and the most extraordinary first 100 days of any president in American history."

Multiple speakers and attendees praised Trump along with Musk and Mike Johnson.

== AmericaFest 2025 ==
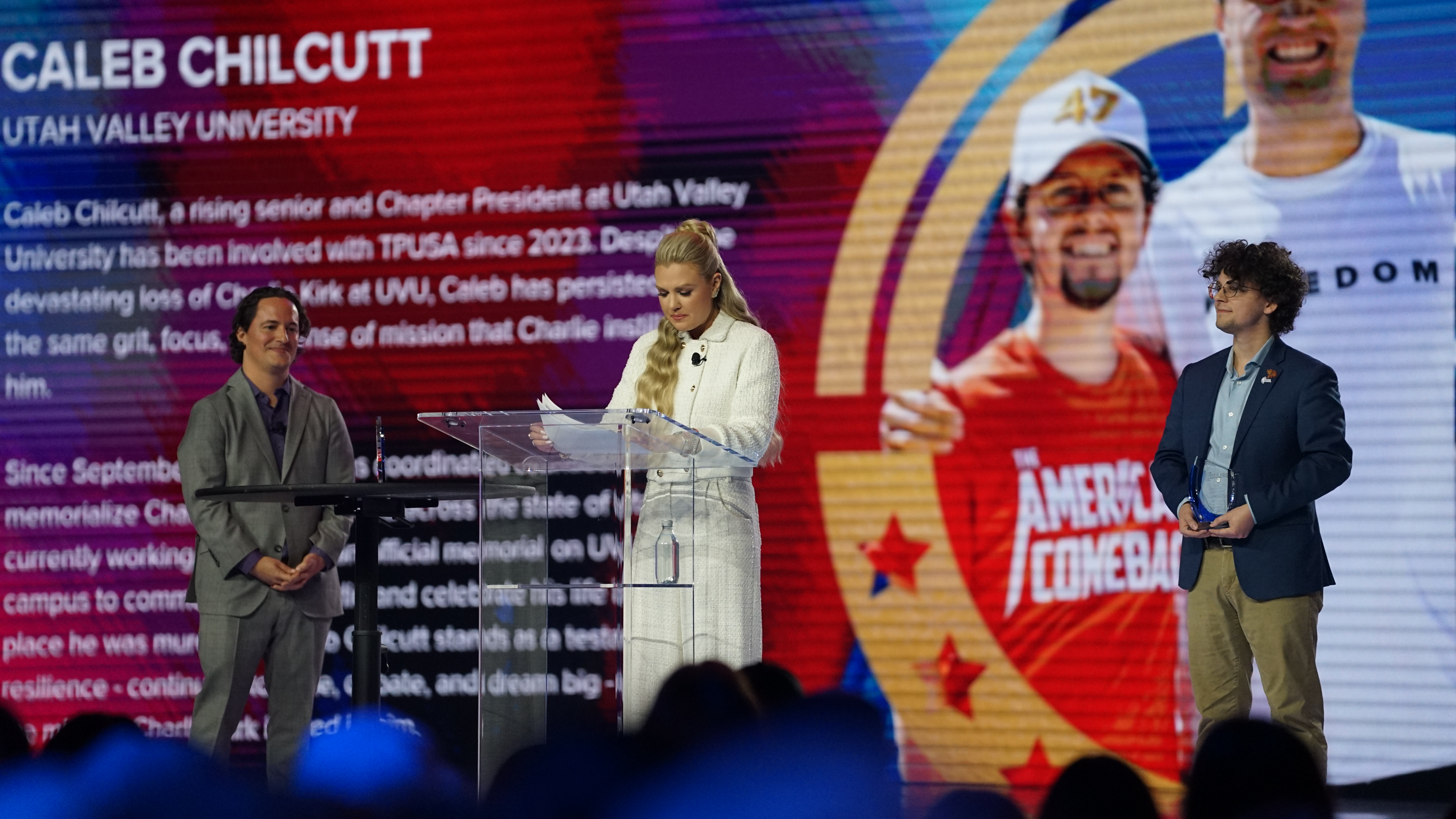
Erika Kirk speaking at AmericaFest 2025, with an image of Charlie Kirk on the background screen

More than 30,000 people attended AmericaFest 2025, which was the first to be held since the assassination of Charlie Kirk.

=== Speakers ===
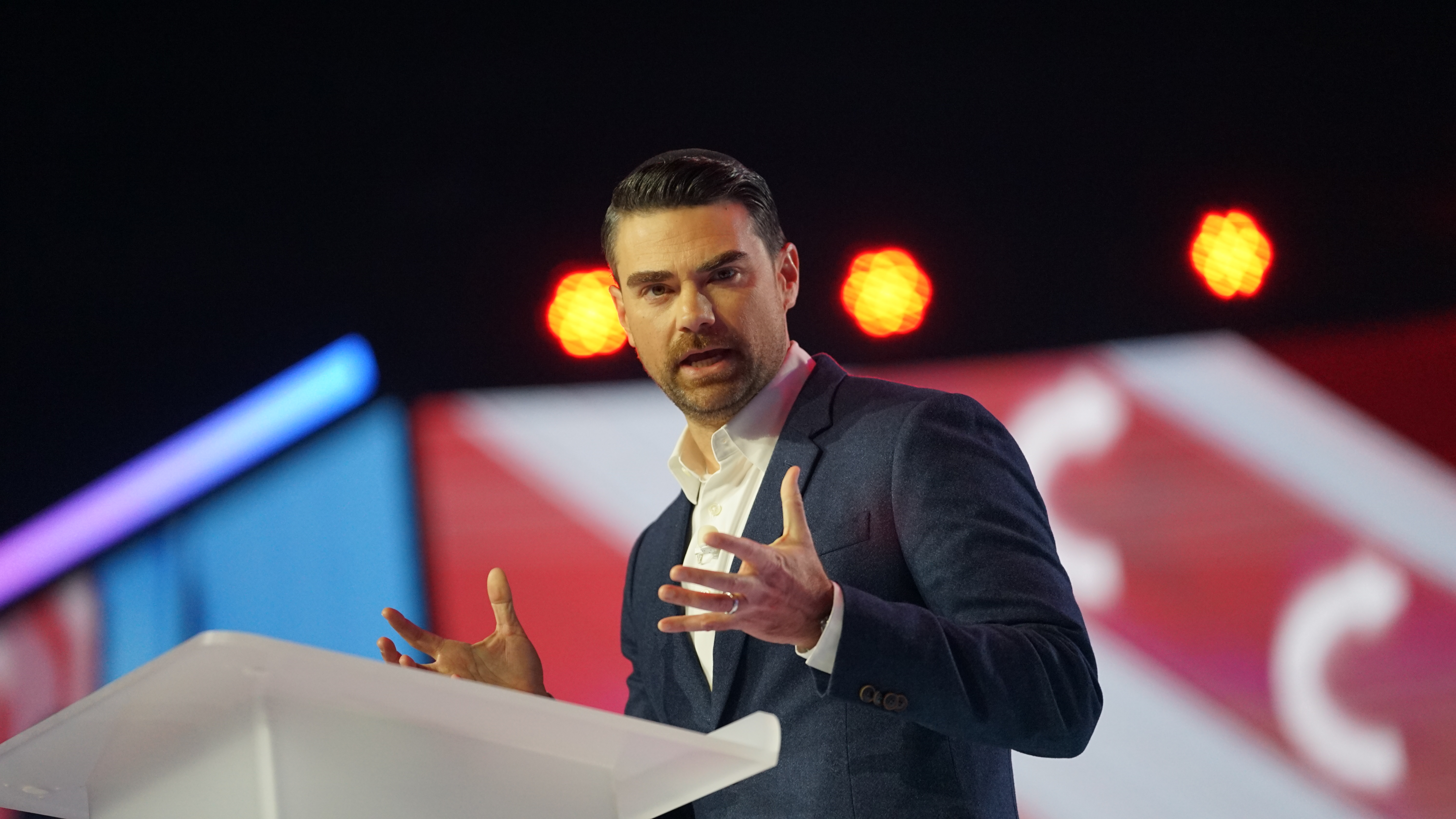
Ben Shapiro speaking at AmericaFest 2025

AmericaFest 2025 featured several new and returning speakers. TPUSA CEO Erika Kirk spoke first, endorsing Vice President JD Vance for president in 2028, with 84% of attendees agreeing with her. Vance also spoke at the event, attacking Governor Gavin Newsom, over his governorship of California. He also spoke about ending white guilt and stated he believed the United States is a Christian nation. Conservative commentator Ben Shapiro spoke about US relations with Israel and antisemitism within the conservative movement.

Former Fox News host Tucker Carlson criticized Shapiro at the event, stating his attempt of deplatforming was against the Values of TPUSA. Carlson also condemned the United States' support of Israel's invasion of Gaza, particularly the large death toll of Women and Children.

Former White House Chief Strategist Steve Bannon also criticized Shapiro, stating he was "like a cancer."

English comedian Russell Brand spoke about Christianity and criticized both vaccines and the pharmaceutical industry.

Speaker Vivek Ramaswamy condemned the Alt-right, specifically the rise of racism and antisemitism within the conservative movement. He rejected the concept of a Heritage American, quoting former president Ronald Reagan that being American is about values rather than lineage.

Health Secretary Robert F. Kennedy Jr. promoted the Make America Healthy Again movement.

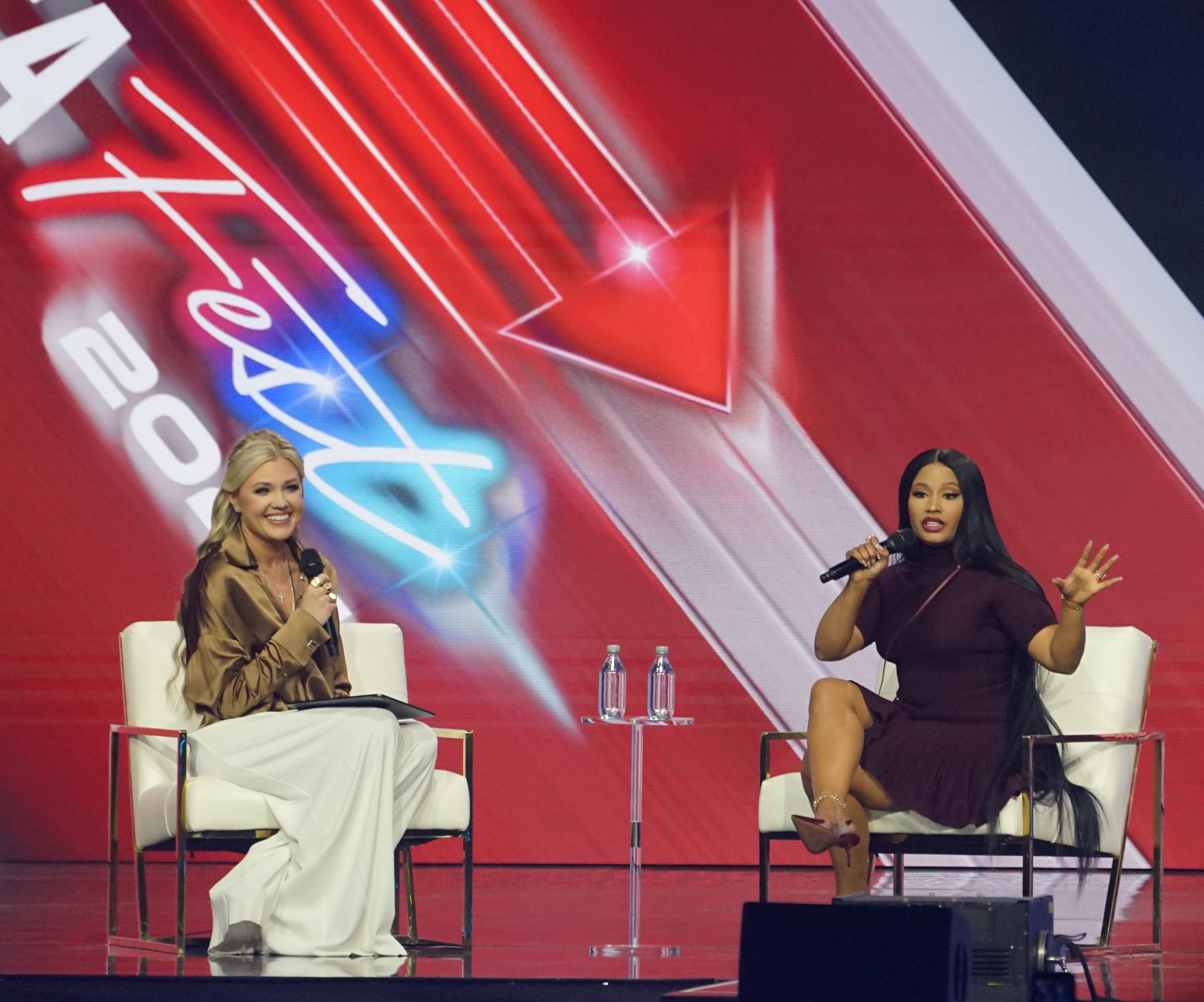
Nicki Minaj and Erika Kirk speaking at Amfest 2025

Nicki Minaj made a surprise appearance at the event. The rapper expressed her support for President Donald Trump, and condemning the global persecution of Christians. She also expressed criticism of Newsom's governorship of California. Minaj was met with backlash from her fanbase after her appearance, specifically LGBTQ and Civil Rights activists.

=== Criticism ===
The event highlighted internal conflicts and disagreements within the conservative movement. The Hill defined the event as "an open power struggle over who gets to define the movement and who gets pushed out." Esam Boraey from the Cornell University's Center on Global Democracy said the rift is primarily about the division between the MAGA and the America First movements, stating the latter is more dominant.

Comedian and podcaster Tim Dillon questioned Erika Kirk backing JD Vance to be the next president. Unicorn Riot contributor L. Cam Anderson who attended the event criticized the disunity of the conservative movement. Conservative commentator Candace Owens also criticized TPUSA and Erika Kirk for glorifying the death of Charlie Kirk.

== See also ==
- Conservative Political Action Conference
- National Conservatism Conference
- Republican National Convention
