= Kaitlin Bennett =

American activist (born 1995)

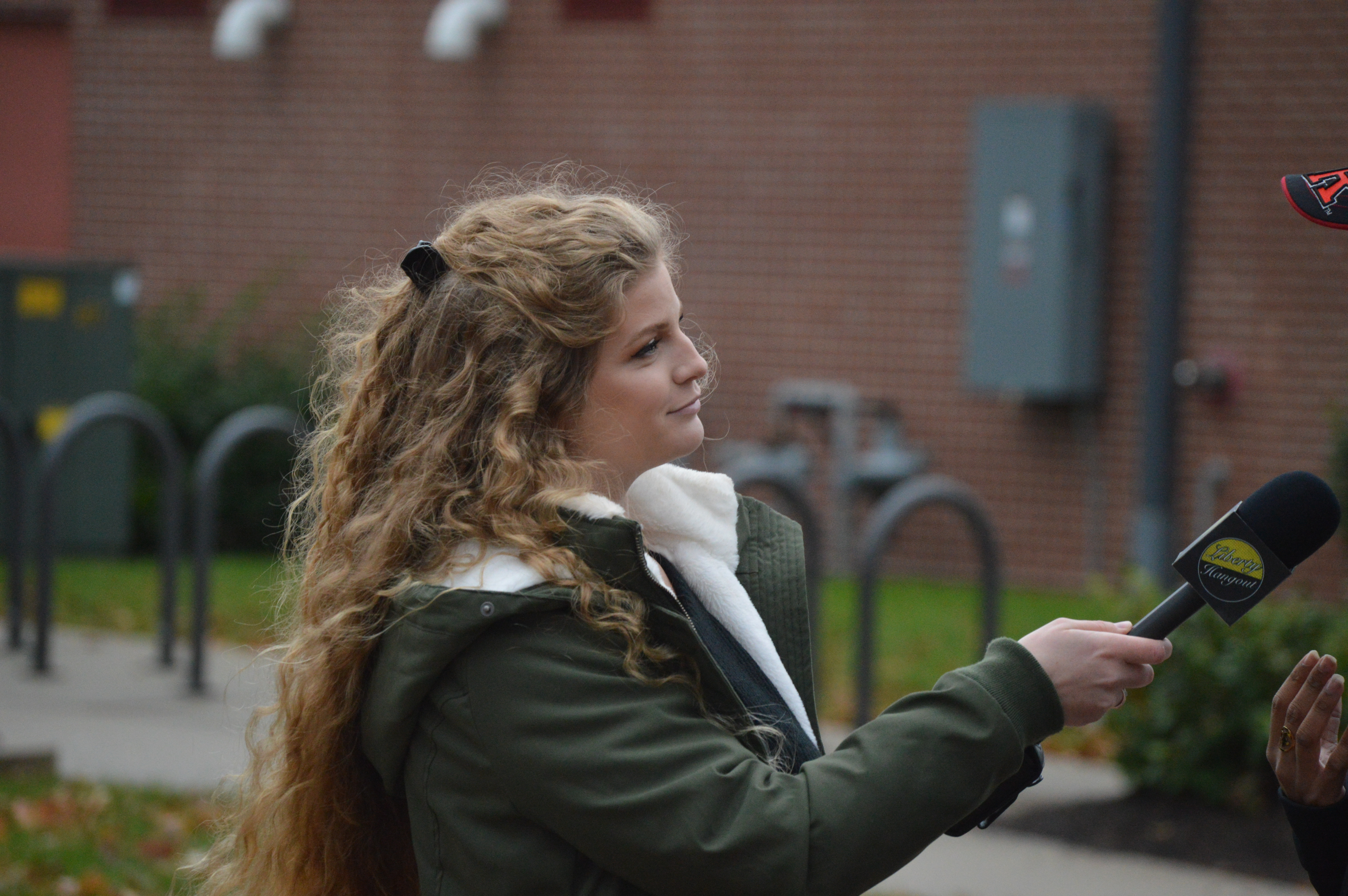
- Bennett at Rutgers University, 2019
- Born: Kaitlin Marie Bennett; October 15, 1995 (age 30); Zanesville, Ohio, U.S.
- Education: Kent State University (BS)
- Known for: Open carrying an AR-10 at Kent State the day after her graduation
- Spouse: Justin Moldow (m. 2020)
- Children: 2

Kaitlin Marie Bennett (born October 15, 1995) is an American gun rights activist and conservative social media personality. She received media attention in 2018 for open-carrying an AR-10 rifle at Kent State University after graduating. Bennett is the face of the YouTube channel Liberty Hangout, which was founded by her husband and promotes the Austrian school of economics.

== Education ==
Bennett was the president of the Kent State chapter of Turning Point USA; however, after an event where a member of her chapter publicly wore a diaper to protest campus safe spaces the chapter did not succeed in October 2017, she resigned. In May 2018, Bennett graduated with a degree in biology from Kent State University in Kent, Ohio.

== Media attention ==
In 2018, Bennett posed for her graduation photo from the university holding an AR-10 long gun in front of the university sign. She stated that as a student at Kent State, she should have been able to open-carry for self-defense, citing the 1970 Kent State shootings where Ohio National Guardsmen fired on unarmed students protesting the U.S. bombing of Cambodia (Operation Menu). As social media users mainly associated Bennett with her gun rights activism, many media publications referenced her "Gun Girl" nickname.

Later in 2018, Bennett organized an open-carry rally at the college. The university released a statement that a cease and desist order had been issued against advertising the event, as Bennett had not attempted to register it with the university. Following her initial protest of Kent State, Bennett became a correspondent for InfoWars. Due to her affiliation with the site, she was ejected from a campaign event for Bernie Sanders. She returned to the university in November of that year to host a discussion on gun rights.

In January 2020, clips surfaced online of her 2019 interviews with University of Kentucky students. Originally posted by Liberty Hangout with the title "College Students Have No Morals", the videos show Bennett questioning the students about resources for transgender people in bathrooms which attracted significant online attention. One student interviewed used the attention to raise money for charity.

In February, Bennett went to Ohio University to ask trivia questions for President's Day, but was confronted by a large crowd of college students opposing her. The visit turned into a confrontation with student protesters, forcing her off campus within two hours, leading to a strong online reaction and increased media attention, and further establishing her as a conservative media figure. A September 2020 visit by Bennett to the University of Central Florida caused a disturbance due to a similar confrontation with protesters, culminating in her fleeing the campus under the protection of a police escort.

== Personal life ==
Bennett became engaged in 2019 to Justin Moldow, the founder of Liberty Hangout. The couple later married in a March 2020 ceremony. In 2021, she announced her conversion to Roman Catholicism, formerly identifying as an atheist. In January 2026, Bennett announced that she was pregnant with the couple's third child, and in June said that she would be taking a hiatus from her Liberty Hangout activities due to severe morning sickness.

Bennett resides in the Tampa Bay area of Florida.
