= Alex Clark (commentator) =

American media personality and podcast host (born 1993)

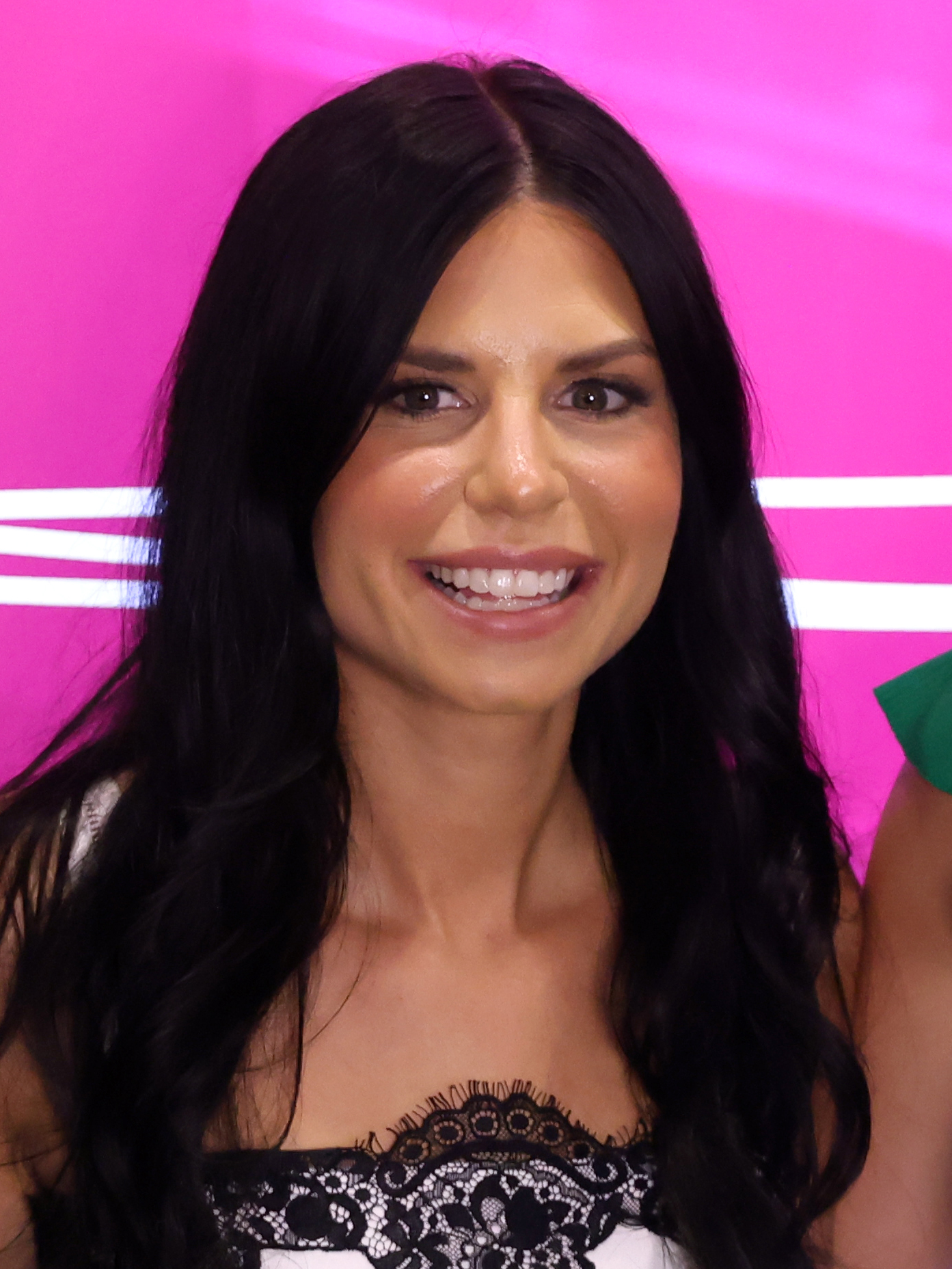
- Clark in 2026
- Born: February 23, 1993 (age 33)
- Spouse: Vance Voetberg (m. 2026)

YouTube information
- Channel: Real Alex Clark
- Years active: 2020–present
- Genres: Reaction; politics; popular culture
- Subscribers: 824 thousand
- Views: 340 million
- Last updated: September 17, 2026

Alexandra Clark Voetberg (born February 23, 1993) is an American media personality and podcast host associated with Turning Point USA. She is the host of Culture Apothecary (previously known as The Spillover) and previously hosted POPlitics, podcasts that cover conservative commentary, pop culture, and wellness topics.

== Early life ==
Clark was born on February 23, 1993. She grew up in Floyd County, Indiana, and graduated from Floyd Central High School. She wanted to work in fashion journalism with a goal of working at Teen Vogue.

== Career ==
=== Radio career ===
After completing high school, Clark attended Ivy Tech Community College and took an internship at WXMA-FM, a pop radio station in Louisville, Kentucky. After an audition, she then became a traffic reporter for rival station WDJX in 2012 and eventually became midday host. In 2016, Clark left WDJX to become co-host of the Joe & Alex morning show on WNOW in Indianapolis.

=== Podcasting career ===
Clark began her career in conservative media in 2019 as the host of POPlitics, a show produced by Turning Point USA, of which she is a contributor. The show combines celebrity culture with conservative commentary. Through POPlitics, she cultivated a following she referred to as "Cuteservatives".

In 2020, Clark expanded her media presence with a second podcast, The Spillover, through which she began discussing health and wellness topics, particularly during the COVID-19 pandemic. In September 2024, Clark relaunched her podcast calling it Culture Apothecary which since then has regularly ranked in the top 10 of health and wellness pod-casts on Apple and Spotify. Her new show got a boost when she was invited by U.S. Senator Ron Johnson to speak at a Senate roundtable on health and nutrition. At the round table, she discussed chronic disease prevention as well as her disapproval for childhood vaccines stating, "We did not sign up to coparent with the government, we want a divorce!" In an interview with Vanity Fair, Clark stated, "I try to make almost every episode nonpartisan"

Clark has been vocal about her stance on hormonal birth control, which she has criticized in her podcasts and social media posts. She has encouraged young women to question its widespread use, emphasizing awareness of potential side effects. While she acknowledges that birth control can be beneficial in specific cases, Clark argues against its default prescription, citing health concerns. Her position aligns with a broader conservative push questioning mainstream medical practices, a stance that has drawn both significant support and criticism from medical professionals and advocates. According to Media Matters for America (MMA), she has described it as "poison" and suggested it poses numerous health risks. MMA has labeled her claims as misinformation, countering that medical consensus does not support such negative generalizations.

In addition to her wellness commentary, Clark has maintained her connection with conservative political circles. She has served as a host and speaker at Turning Point USA's Young Women's Leadership Summit and participated in the "Make America Healthy Again" (MAHA) initiative, which emerged in alignment with the broader MAGA movement. In 2024 she stated on her show that she would not mind "if it was just the male head of household that voted."

== Personal life ==
Clark lives in Scottsdale, Arizona. After a year of dating, Clark announced her engagement to Vance Voetberg in June 2026. They married on August 29, 2026, at Voetberg's childhood home.
