= Erika Kirk =

American businesswoman (born 1988)

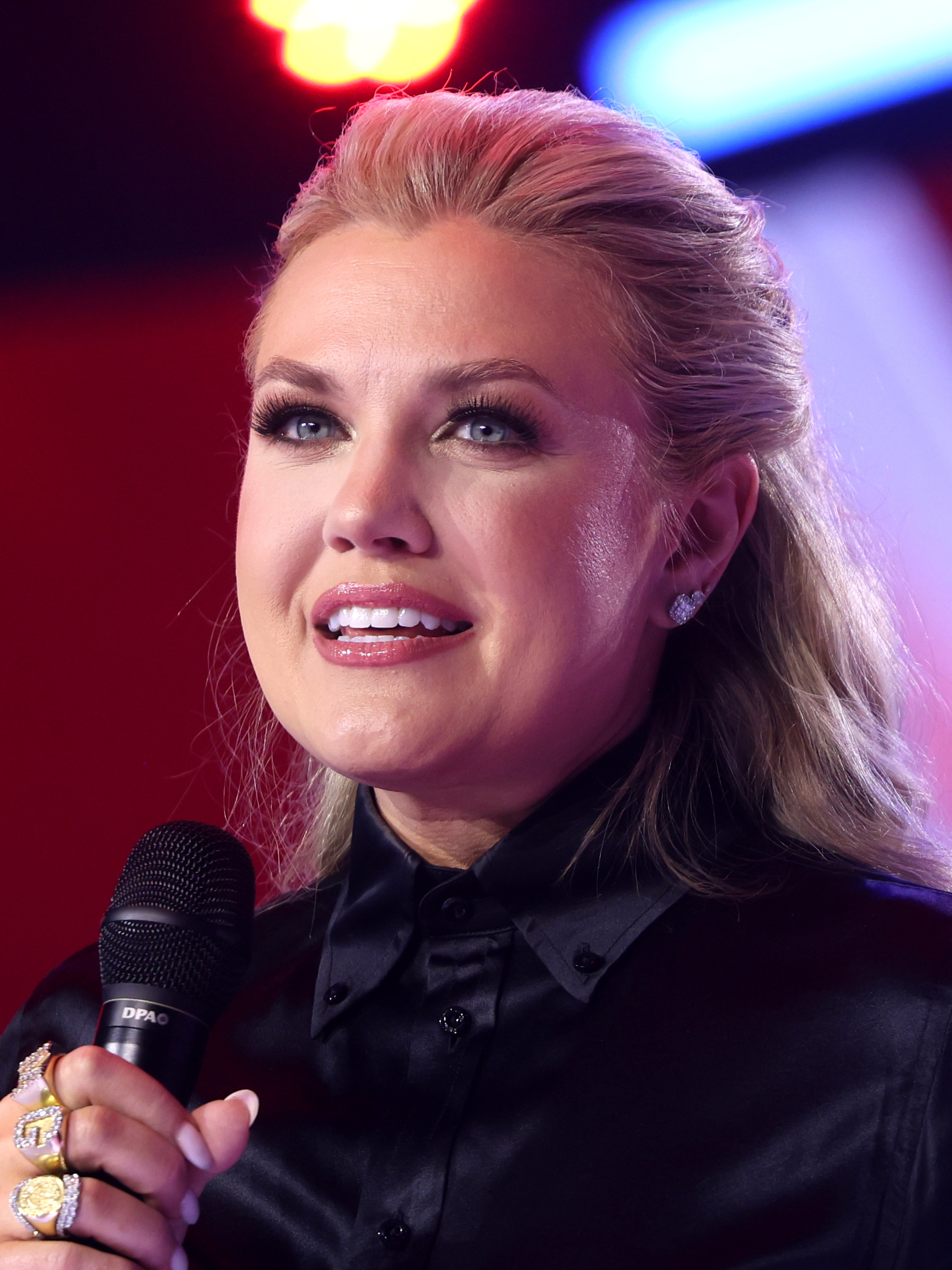
- Kirk in December 2025
- Born: Erika Lane Frantzve; November 20, 1988 (age 37); Cincinnati, Ohio, U.S.
- Education: Regis University (attended); Arizona State University, Tempe (BA); Liberty University (MJur)
- Occupations: Businesswoman; podcaster
- Organization: Turning Point USA
- Title: Chief executive officer
- Political party: Republican
- Spouse: Charlie Kirk (m. 2021; died 2025)
- Children: 2
- Beauty pageant titleholder
- Title: Miss Arizona USA 2012
- Major competition: Miss USA 2012 (unplaced)

Erika Lane Kirk (née Frantzve; born November 20, 1988) is an American businesswoman, nonprofit executive, and podcaster. She serves as chairwoman and CEO of Turning Point USA (TPUSA), a conservative organization co-founded and led by her late husband, Charlie Kirk, until his assassination in September 2025. She was appointed as his successor following his death.

Erika won Miss Arizona USA in 2012 and competed in Miss USA 2012. She founded two initiatives: Everyday Heroes Like You, a nonprofit which highlights overlooked charities, and BIBLEin365, which encourages Bible reading. Erika also hosts the podcast Midweek Rise Up. She married Charlie in 2021 after they began dating in 2019, and they had two children together.

== Early life ==
Erika Lane Frantzve was born on November 20, 1988, in Cincinnati, Ohio, to Lori and Kent Frantzve. After her parents divorced, she was raised by her mother in Scottsdale, Arizona. One of her grandfathers was an immigrant from Sweden. In an interview with Megyn Kelly, Erika mentioned that her mother, Lori, said their family has a Lebanese-Italian background. She was raised Catholic.

She attended Notre Dame Preparatory High School in Scottsdale, where she played basketball and volleyball, earning the Matt Arnold Sportsmanship and Teammate Awards. In 2006, Erika established Everyday Heroes Like You, a 501(c)(3) organization that she described as a way to "promote and highlight the everyday heroes in our communities who have a philanthropic desire to truly make a difference in the lives of others", with national programs. She played basketball for two years at Regis University in Denver, Colorado, appearing in eight games in the 2007–08 season as a reserve. She completed her undergraduate studies at Arizona State University, double majoring in political science and international relations.

== Career ==
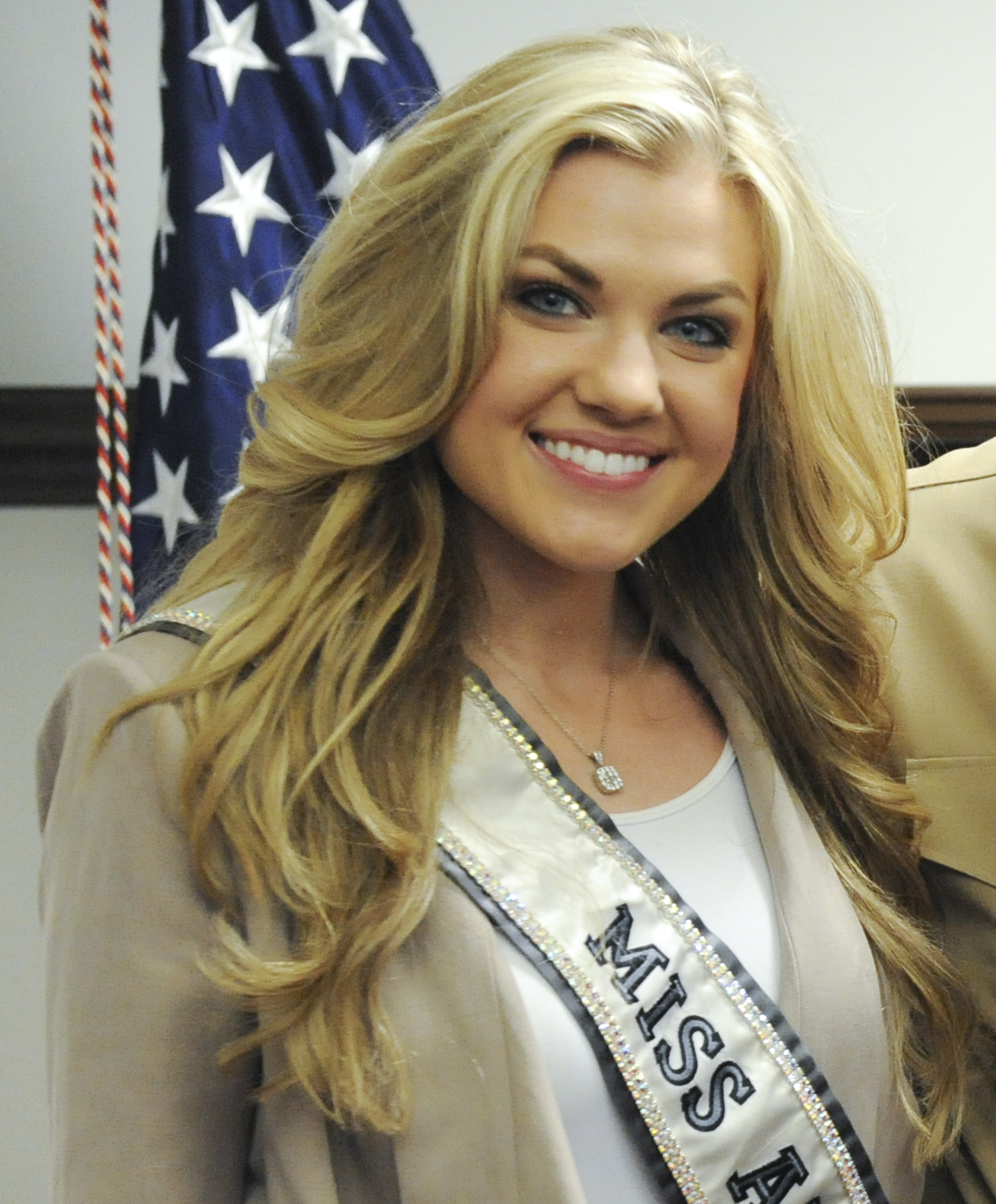
Frantzve as Miss Arizona USA winner in 2012

Frantzve competed in the Miss Arizona USA 2012 pageant, which she won on her 23rd birthday, and then represented Arizona in Miss USA 2012, but did not place. She holds a degree in American Legal Studies from Liberty University, where she is studying for a doctorate in biblical studies as of 2025. In 2019, Frantzve launched the podcast Midweek Rise Up. That year, she also appeared on the reality television series Summer House.

She is the CEO of Proclaim Streetwear (Proclaim365), a clothing brand, and BIBLEin365, a ministry project. As of 2025, she works as a real estate agent at the Corcoran Group in New York City. After the assassination of her husband, Charlie Kirk, she became CEO and chair of the board of Turning Point USA (TPUSA). In March 2026, President Donald Trump appointed her to the United States Air Force Academy Board of Visitors.

== Personal life ==
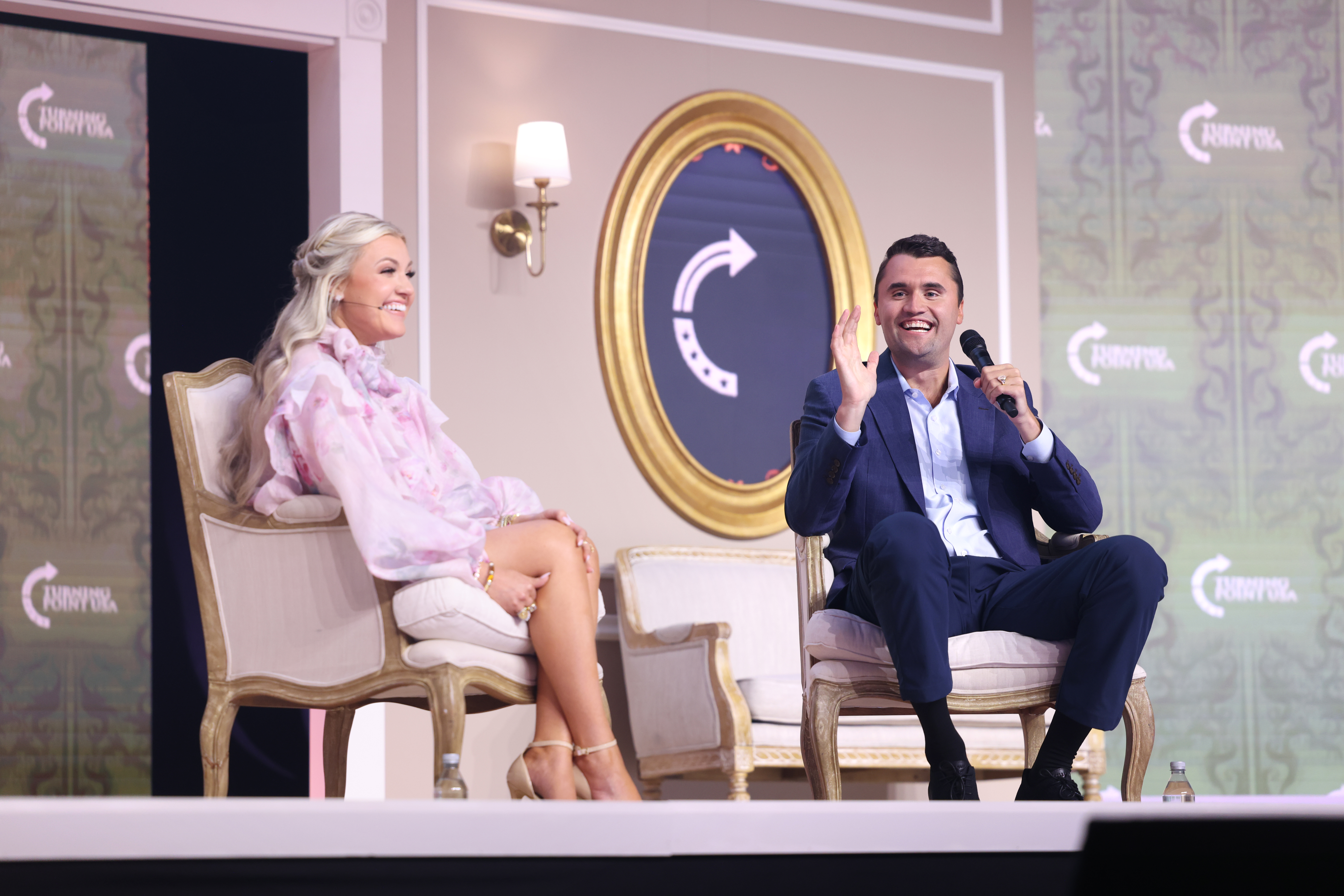
Erika and Charlie Kirk speaking together at an event in Texas in June 2025

Erika and Charlie Kirk began dating in New York City in 2019, and became engaged in December 2020. Charlie was the co-founder of Turning Point USA (TPUSA). They married on May 8, 2021, in Scottsdale. TPUSA funded a wedding reception at the Fairmont Scottsdale Princess hotel, coinciding with the organization's ninth anniversary. She was frequently seen at Charlie's events. The couple had two children, a daughter born in 2022 and a son born in 2024.

On September 10, 2025, Charlie was assassinated while speaking at Utah Valley University during his American Comeback tour. She later delivered a widely reported address from TPUSA headquarters, pledging to continue her husband's work.

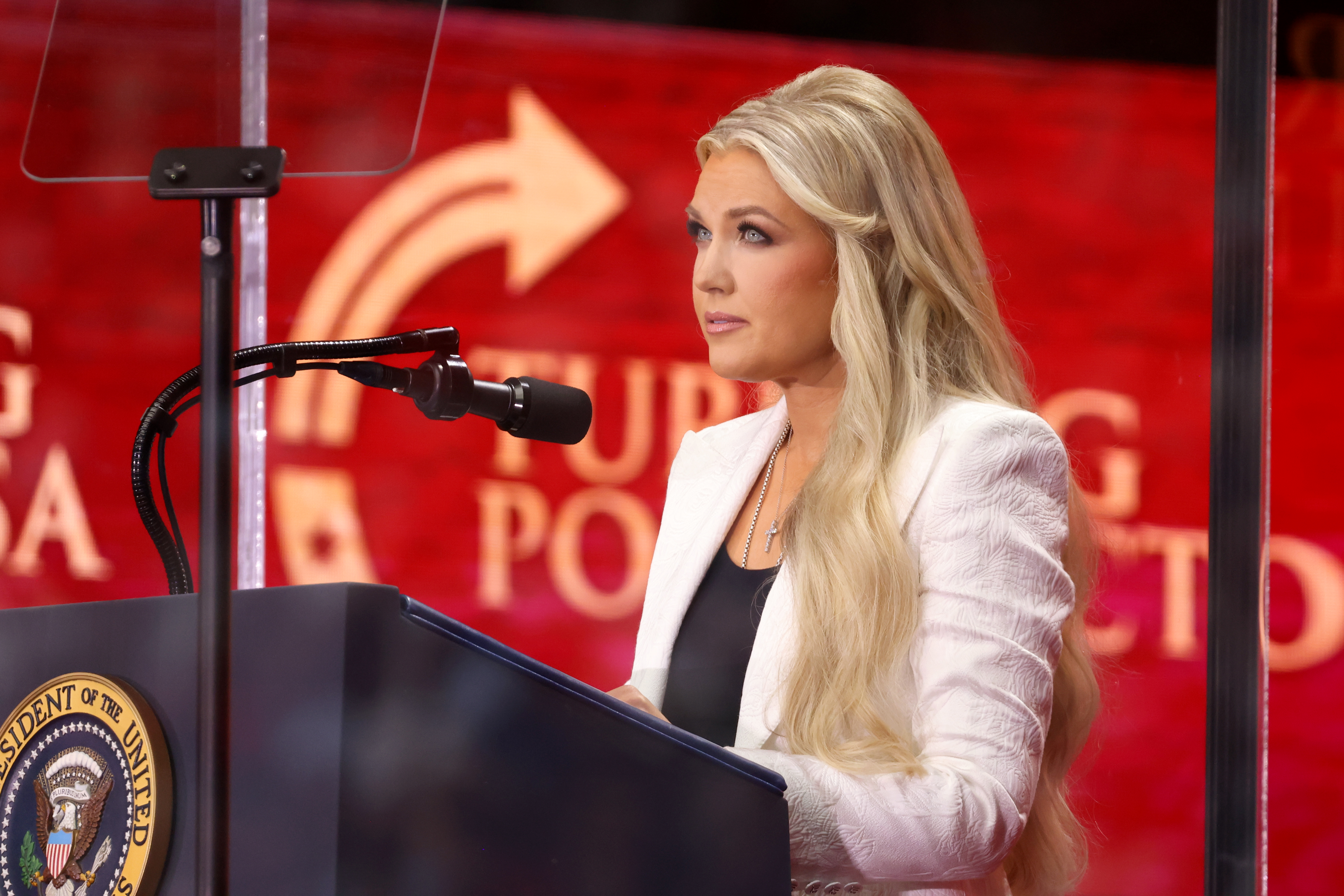
Erika speaking at the memorial service of Charlie Kirk, September 21, 2025

In an interview with The New York Times, Kirk described how she insisted on seeing her husband's body despite law‑enforcement advice. She reportedly told authorities, "With all due respect, I want to see what they did to my husband", before kissing him goodbye. She said he appeared to have died happy, with a "Mona Lisa–like half-smile". A memorial service for Charlie was held on September 21 at State Farm Stadium in Glendale, Arizona, where Kirk publicly forgave the man accused of killing her husband. The service was attended by between 90,000 and 100,000 people, including President Donald Trump and Vice President JD Vance.

Kirk was present at the White House Correspondents' Dinner shooting in April 2026. She was unharmed and was seen crying as security escorted her away.
