= Turning Point USA =

American conservative nonprofit organization

Coordinates: 33°22′30″N 111°58′32″W

Turning Point USA, Inc.
- Abbreviation: TPUSA
- Formation: June 5, 2012; 14 years ago
- Founders: Charlie Kirk; Bill Montgomery
- Type: Nonprofit organization
- Tax ID no.: 80-0835023
- Purpose: Advocacy of conservatism on education campuses
- Headquarters: Phoenix, Arizona
- Region served: United States
- CEO: Erika Kirk
- Revenue: ▲$114 million (2024)
- Expenses: ▲$104 million (2024)
- Employees: 411 (2024)
- Website: tpusa.com

Turning Point USA, Inc. (TPUSA) is an American nonprofit organization that advocates for conservative politics on high school, college, and university campuses. It was founded in 2012 by Charlie Kirk and Bill Montgomery. TPUSA's affiliate groups include Turning Point Endowment, Turning Point Action, and TPUSA Faith. TPUSA has been described as the fastest growing organization of campus chapters in America and one of the most powerful conservative youth groups in the nation.

In 2016, the organization launched Professor Watchlist, a website that lists academic staff that, according to TPUSA, "discriminate against conservative students and advance leftist propaganda in the classroom." TPUSA has attempted to influence student government elections in an effort to "combat modern liberalism on college and university campuses." In 2021, TPUSA started its School Board Watchlist website, which publishes names and photos of school board members who have adopted mask mandates or anti-racist curricula.

Though aligned with the Christian right, TPUSA has led its operations separate from traditional conservative organizations nationwide. TPUSA hosts several annual conferences, including the Student Action Summit, Young Women's Leadership Summit, Young Black Leadership Summit, and AmericaFest. The organization is funded by conservative donors and foundations, including Republican Party politicians.

== History ==
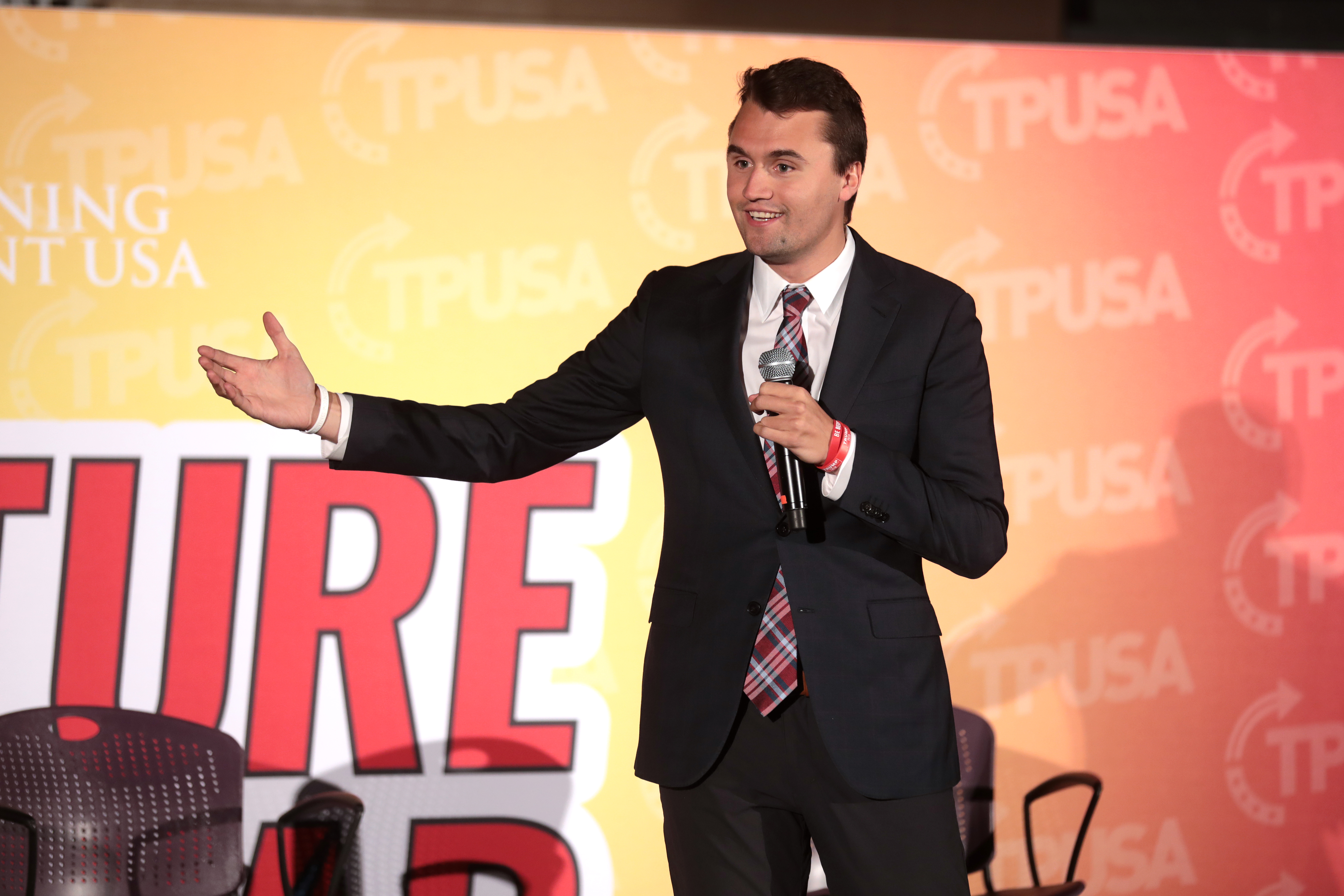
Charlie Kirk speaking at Culture War Tour, October 2019

In May 2012, 18-year-old Charlie Kirk gave a speech at Benedictine University's Youth Government Day. Impressed, retired marketing entrepreneur and Tea Party activist Bill Montgomery encouraged Kirk to postpone college and engage full-time in political activism. A month later, the day after Kirk graduated from high school, they launched Turning Point USA, a section 501(c)(3) nonprofit organization. Montgomery became Kirk's mentor, and worked behind the scenes handling the paperwork for the organization. Montgomery often described himself as the group's co-founder.

At the 2012 Republican National Convention, Kirk met Foster Friess, a Republican donor, and persuaded him to make a "five-figure" donation to the organization. Friess also was on the organization's advisory council, alongside Ginni Thomas, wife of U.S. Supreme Court justice Clarence Thomas. Barry Russell, president and CEO of the Independent Petroleum Association of America (IPAA), was a key advisor as of 2019.

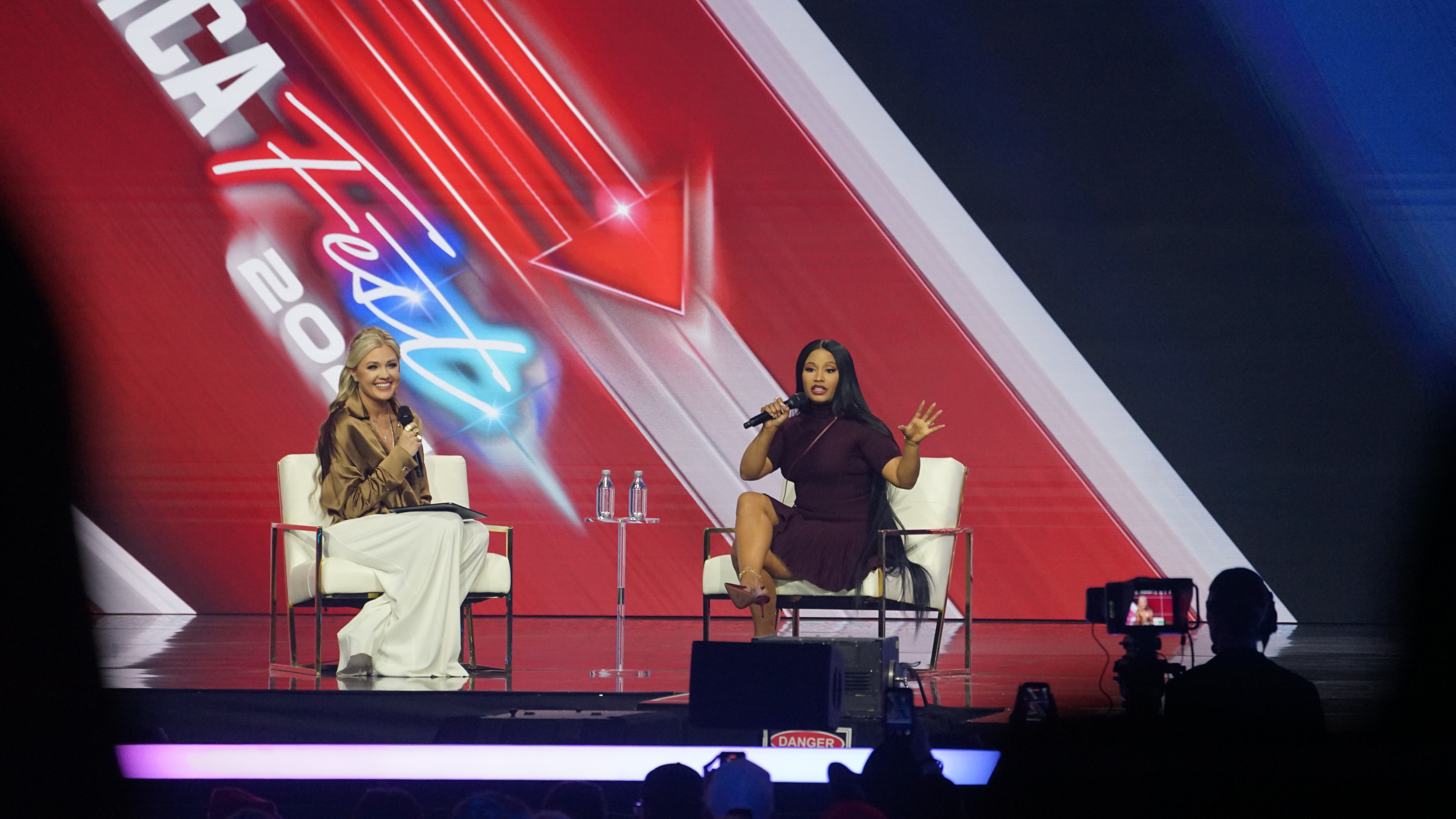
Nicki Minaj being interviewed by Erika Kirk at Turning Point USA, 2025

Between July 2016 and June 2017, the organization raised in excess of US$8.2 million. The same year, leaked records found that the group had funneled "thousands of dollars" into student governments to elect conservatives. Donors include Home Depot co-founder Bernard Marcus, former Illinois Governor Bruce Rauner, Richard Uihlein, and the Donors Trust on behalf of private donors.

In March 2023, it was announced via Twitter by Charlie Kirk and Candace Owens that the BLEXIT Foundation and TPUSA had partnered. BLEXIT would be incorporating their message through TPUSA's branding style and corporate structure, while retaining Candace Owens and Brandon Tatum in leadership roles.

On September 10, 2025, co-founder Charlie Kirk was assassinated at Utah Valley University in Orem, Utah, during what would have been a series of events planned by the organization. On September 18, 2025, Kirk's widow Erika was selected to succeed Kirk as CEO. In the immediate days after Kirk's death, TPUSA reported over 60,000 inquiries to start new campus chapters at high school and college campuses across the country. Thousands of American flags, balloons, letters, and drawings were placed outside the organization's headquarters in Phoenix, Arizona by supporters.

== Leadership and associates ==
=== Charlie Kirk ===
Kirk was CEO, chief fundraiser, and the public face of Turning Point USA from its founding until his assassination in September 2025. The New York Times credits him with turning the organization into a "well-funded media operation, backed by conservative megadonors like the Wyoming businessman Foster Friess." Michael Beckel, from the funding watchdog group Issue One, found that oftentimes these megadonors used "dark money vehicles to keep identities out of the limelight."

Kirk addressed the 2016 Republican National Convention. In an interview with Wired magazine during the convention, Kirk said that while he "was not the world's biggest Donald Trump fan", he would vote for him, and that Trump's candidacy made his task more difficult. He spent the rest of the 2016 presidential campaign assisting with travel and media arrangements and running errands for Donald Trump Jr.

Several former employees and student volunteers for TPUSA claimed they had witnessed collusion between high-ranking TPUSA employees – including Kirk himself and top advisor Ginni Thomas – and the presidential campaigns of both Ted Cruz and Marco Rubio. The interactions included Kirk coordinating via email with two officials at a pro-Cruz super PAC to send student volunteers to work for the PAC in South Carolina, as well as two students being requested by Thomas herself, via voicemail, to distribute over 200 Cruz placards in Wisconsin. A former employee for TPUSA, who had been based in Florida, alleged that TPUSA had given the personal information of over 700 student supporters to an employee with Rubio's presidential campaign.

In October 2016, Kirk participated in a Fox News event along with Donald Trump Jr., Eric Trump, and Lara Trump that had a pro-Donald Trump tone. A TPUSA staff member wrote on Facebook that students who attended the event would have their expenses covered. The event led tax experts to say the organization's conduct may have violated its tax-exempt status, a charge disputed by TPUSA. In 2019, Kirk became CEO of Students for Trump. In 2020, he was a keynote speaker on the first day of the Republican National Convention, calling President Donald Trump the "bodyguard of western civilization".

Kirk was assassinated on September 10, 2025, while speaking at Utah Valley University for an event on the TPUSA-sponsored American Comeback Tour. An 8-foot-tall bronze statue of Kirk was installed outside Turning Point USA's headquarters in Phoenix, Arizona in September 2026 by Utah-based artist Quintin McCann. The artist called the work the Charlie Kirk Monument. It depicts Kirk holding a baseball cap and wearing a cross necklace around his neck. On September 13, 2026, the statue was vandalized along with other memorials outside the headquarters. The vandalism was later cleaned up by Turning Point employees.

=== Erika Kirk ===
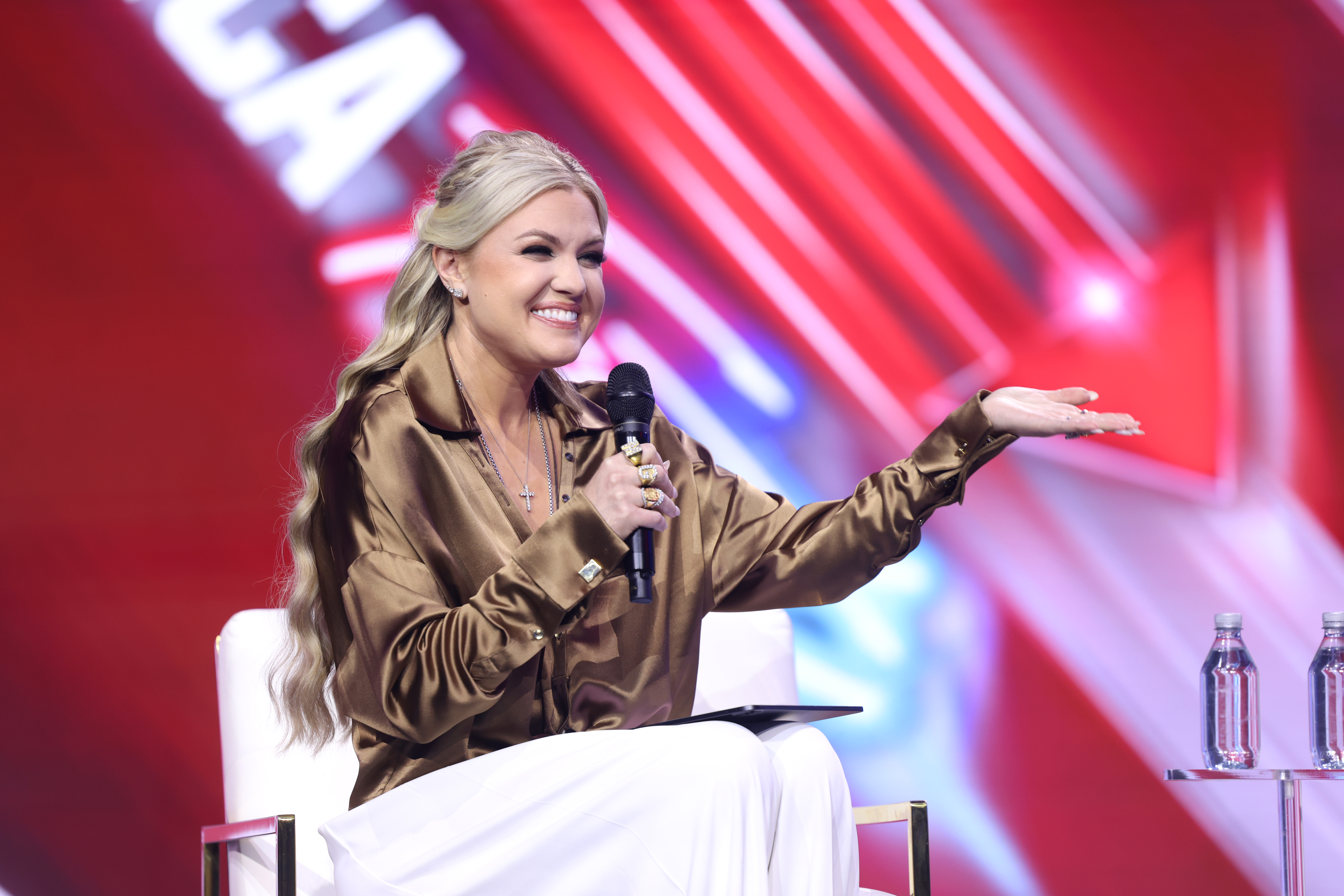
Erika Kirk in December 2025 at AmericaFest

Following Charlie Kirk's death, his widow, Erika, vowed that she would make Turning Point "the biggest thing this nation has ever seen." On September 18, 2025, Turning Point's board unanimously elected Erika as the organization's CEO.

=== Bill Montgomery ===
Bill Montgomery (1940–2020) was a marketing entrepreneur and onetime participant in the Tea Party movement. He launched Turning Point USA with Kirk in 2012 and was the organization's secretary and treasurer until April 2020. Montgomery died of complications resulting from contracting COVID-19 in July 2020.

Tyler Bowyer speaking with attendees at a campaign rally for Andy Biggs for Governor at the Arizona Biltmore in Phoenix, Arizona

=== Others ===
Tyler Bowyer became the organization's chief operating officer (COO) in 2017. In 2022 Bowyer left TPUSA to become full time COO of Turning Point Action as well as start the Turning Point PAC with Kirk.

Michael McCoy is the chief of staff of the organization.

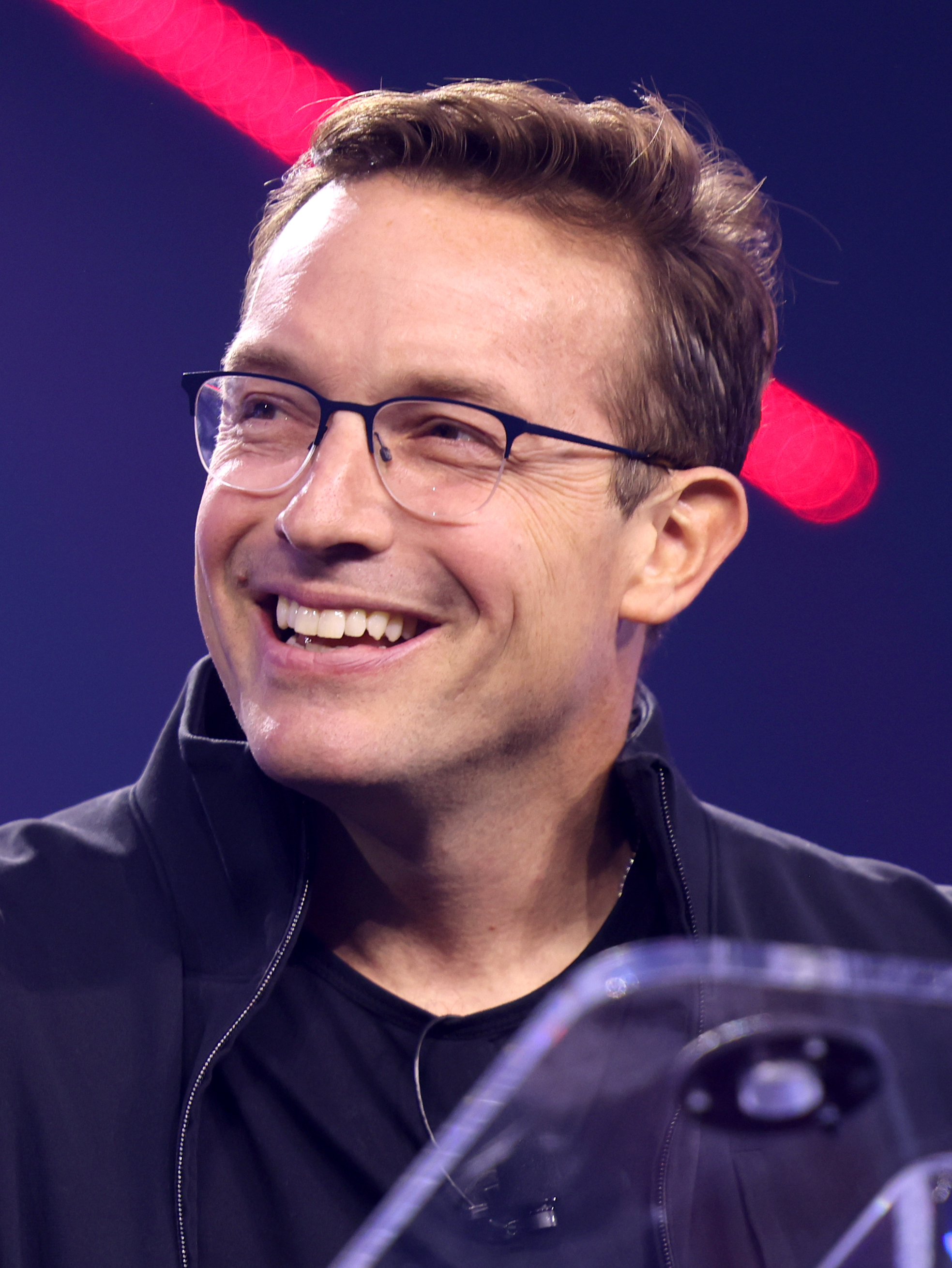
Benny Johnson in December 2024

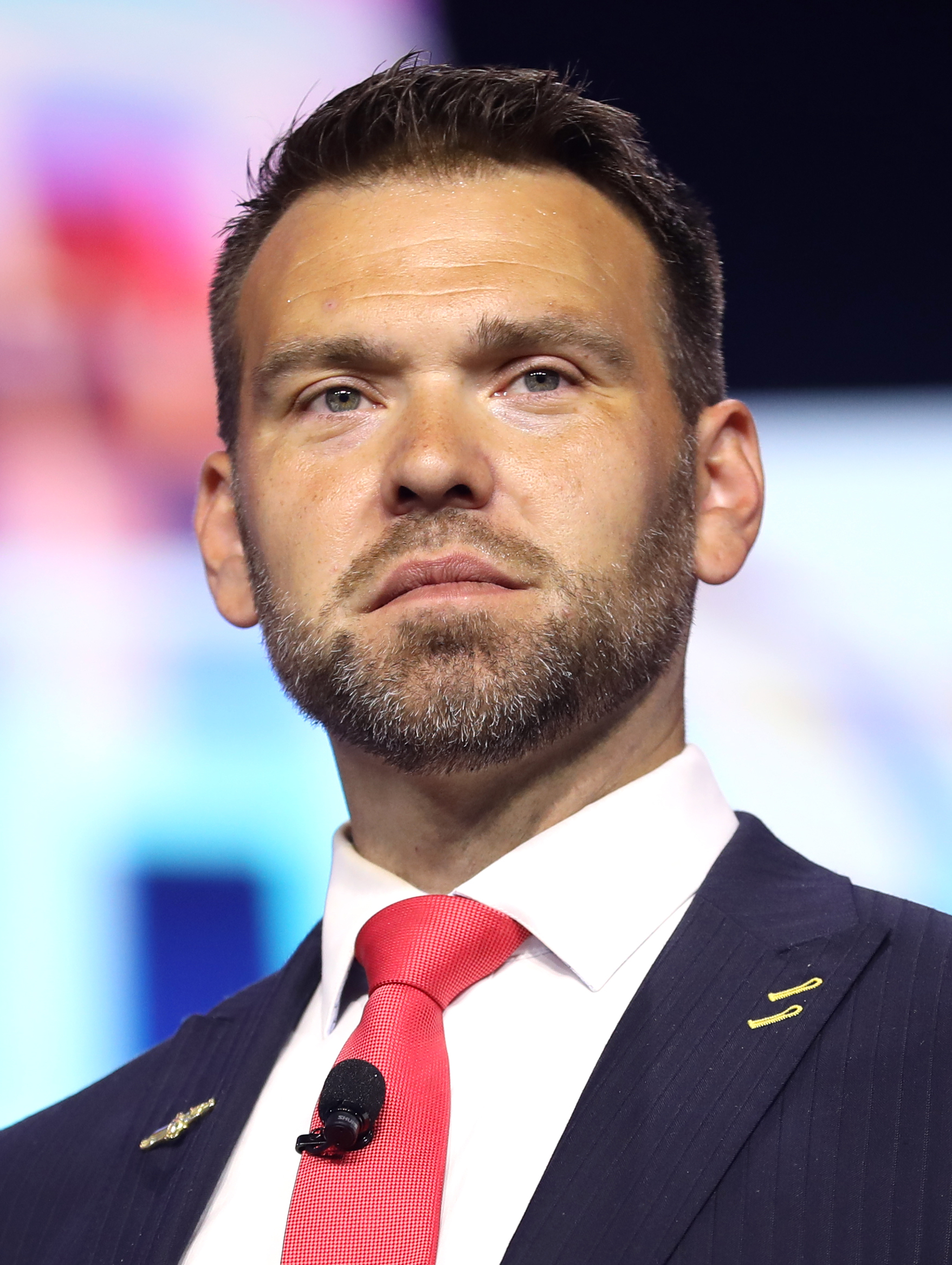
Jack Posobiec in July 2024

In February 2019, Turning Point USA hired Benny Johnson as chief creative officer. Johnson had been fired by BuzzFeed for plagiarism in 2014 and suspended by the Independent Journal Review in 2017 for publishing a conspiracy theory about Barack Obama. In May 2019, communications director Candace Owens resigned after controversial remarks she made in December 2018 were publicized and some TPUSA campus chapters called for her resignation. She had said in a speech at a conservative event in London that "if Hitler just wanted to make Germany great and have things run well, okay fine. The problem is ... he had dreams outside of Germany. He wanted to globalize." She later stated that "leftist journalists" had mischaracterized her statement.

In 2019, Alex Clark became the host of POPlitics. In 2021, political activist Jack Posobiec joined TPUSA to host the show Human Events Daily.

== Activities ==
The New York Times has referred to TPUSA as the nation's "pre-eminent conservative youth organization". The organization says its mission is "to identify, educate, train, and organize students to promote the principles of freedom, free markets, and limited government". TPUSA has chapters at over 850 campuses that register students to vote. Each of TPUSA's paid workers is supposed to meet a quota to make at least 1,500 student contacts per semester. Student volunteers have several different themes for promoting conservative ideas, including "The Healthcare Games", "Game of Loans", and "iCapitalism". According to The Washington Post, TPUSA centers "group membership on making provocative claims and publicly inciting outrage".

Turning Point USA and Turning Point UK promote the Cultural Marxism conspiracy theory and said they are working to "combat it" in universities. Kirk described universities as "islands of totalitarianism".

=== Annual summits ===
Turning Point USA holds several annual national conferences, including the Student Action Summit and the Young Women's Leadership Summit (YWLS). Turning Point USA also hosts the Young Black Leadership Summit and the Young Latino Leadership Summit. TPUSA provided lodging and some meals for the attendees who could also apply for travel stipends.

==== Student Action Summit ====
Student Action Summit (SAS) is one of TPUSA's signature annual events. It focuses on galvanizing conservative ideals and values towards high school/college students from all 50 states through networking, leadership workshops and guest speakers. 2025 Student Action Summit saw its largest ever turnout with 5,000 attendees at the Tampa convention center with guest speakers Border czar Tom Homan, Department of Homeland Security Secretary Kristi Noem, Secretary of Defense Pete Hegseth, Donald Trump Jr. and Tucker Carlson with Charlie Kirk also addressing the crowd.

==== AmericaFest ====
In December 2021, Turning Point USA also launched AmericaFest, a four-day conference that featured conservative speakers such as Donald Trump Jr., and Sarah Palin interspersed with country music acts. Kyle Rittenhouse, who recently had been acquitted of murder charges in the Kenosha unrest shooting, was introduced with a standing ovation and participated in a discussion about the incident.

Keynote speakers in 2023 included Glenn Beck, Roseanne Barr, Mike Lindell, Kimberly Guilfoyle, Tucker Carlson, and Charlie Kirk. The event was TPUSA's largest conference yet, with 13,000 attendees visiting over the course of the multi-day event. In December 2024, AmericaFest was held in Phoenix, Arizona. Keynote speakers included Donald Trump, Ben Shapiro, Kirk, Carlson, Patrick Bet-David, Matt Walsh, Riley Gaines, and Cenk Uygur.

In 2025, there were disagreements between Tucker Carlson (and to a lesser extent Nick Fuentes) and Ben Shapiro regarding Israel during the conference. Nicki Minaj was a surprise speaker on the fourth day of Americafest, who was then interviewed on stage by Erika Kirk. Minaj shared comments of support and admiration for president Donald Trump and vice president J.D. Vance and spoke about her stance on violence against Christians in Nigeria.

==== Women's Leadership Summit ====
For ten years, the Young Women's Leadership Summit (YWLS) has brought together Republicans for prayer circles, brunches and forums on "God's design in your career", speakers and guests topics are light on policy and more focused on "dating, parenting and nutrition advice" as per articles from The Times. YWLS had its biggest attendance in 2025 at the Gaylord Texan resort & convention center with over 3,000 women, Charlie Kirk and his wife Erika Kirk both spoke at the event along with several other prominent conservative figures, who then would answer questions from the crowd.

YWLS focuses to promote women's leadership, encourages women to get married, have children, and become homemakers. The National Rifle Association (NRA) was the headline sponsor of the YWLS in 2017 and 2018. According to The New York Times, YWLS "styles itself as an alternative to a liberal culture of feminism that many Republicans characterize as oppressive" and had by 2018 "evolved into an ultra-Trumpian event complete with 'lock her up' chants and vulgar T-shirts disparaging Hillary Clinton". Candace Owens, who days prior to the 2018 conference stirred controversy by saying "the entire premise of #metoo is that women are stupid, weak, and inconsequential", was greeted with a standing ovation at the conference.

In 2026, TPUSA rebranded the event to Women's Leadership Summit, dropping the word "Young" from its name. The 2026 summit brought in over 2,000 attendees.

=== Professor Watchlist ===
First appearing on November 21, 2016, Turning Point USA also operates a website called Professor Watchlist. Kirk said that the site is "dedicated to documenting and exposing college professors who discriminate against conservative students, promote anti-American values, and advance leftist propaganda in the classroom". As of December 2016, more than 250 professors have been added to the site.

Reporting from Politico has described that the list contains many inaccuracies, and includes professors listed for things they did not exactly say or do and others listed for being rude to students or for making "clever remarks" about Trump. Talking to The New York Times, "Mr. Lamb", a director of constitutional enforcement and transparency at TPUSA explained that the list was "simply aggregating" academics who had been subject to news reports. Lamb called the Professor Watchlist "a beautiful example of freedom of speech" and said "Professors can say whatever they want, other people can report it and we can compile the reports on whatever they say."

In October 2023, an English instructor at Arizona State University, who was listed on the Professor Watchlist and was a co-founder of Drag Story Hour Arizona, was followed across ASU by a two-member TPUSA crew repeatedly asking him accusatory questions; he was pushed onto concrete from the back after appearing to try to push away a camera. The instructor, David Boyles, said the resulting wounds to his face were "relatively minor" and said the incident occurred after his class about LGBTQ+ youth in pop culture and politics. ASU's president said TPUSA was at fault for harassment and violence, while TPUSA posts on social media blamed Boyles. ASU's president said he had previously contacted TPUSA in order to have professors at the school removed from the Professor Watchlist but was not given a response.

On October 2, 2025, the Rutgers University chapter of Turning Point USA launched a petition against Rutgers professor Mark Bray, calling for the university to fire him. The petition referred to him as "Dr. Antifa" and called him an "outspoken, well-known antifa member". Members of the chapter also called him "a financier of Antifa". Bray responded saying: "I've never been part of an antifa group, and I'm not currently. There's an effort underway to paint me as someone who is doing the things that I've researched, but that couldn't be further from the truth." The petition was posted after the assassination, when Jack Posobiec referred to him as a "domestic terrorist professor" on X. After Fox News publicized the petition, Bray received death threats and his home address was made public, and he and his wife, who also teaches at Rutgers, decided to flee with their two young children to Spain where Rutgers had said they could continue to teach remotely. The Rutgers chapter denied supporting doxxing or harassment.

=== School Board Watchlist ===
In 2021, TPUSA launched the School Board Watchlist, a site Kirk said would "hold district leaders accountable for 'dangerous agendas'". The website publishes names and photos of members of school boards that have adopted or supported mask mandates, mandatory COVID-19 vaccinations, and the way history, race, and conceptions of gender and sex are taught in schools.

=== Involvement in student government elections ===
Turning Point USA has been involved in influencing student government elections at a number of colleges and universities. Targeted universities included Ohio State University, the University of Wisconsin–Madison, and the University of Maryland. These claims led to conservative candidates at the University of Maryland withdrawing from student elections after failing to report assistance from Turning Point USA.

According to The New Yorker, a private brochure handed out only to TPUSA donors outlined a strategy on how to capture the majority of student-government positions at 80% of Division 1 N.C.A.A. schools, followed by defunding of progressive organizations on campus, eliminating barriers to hate speech, "blocking campus 'boycott, divestment and sanctions' movements", and using "student resources to host speakers and forums promoting 'American Exceptionalism and Free Market ideals on campus.'" The brochure included a list of every Turning Point USA-supported student who was elected to student government positions in the year 2017.

Turning Point USA said that it had helped more than 50 conservatives win elections to become student-body presidents. When Politico looked into Turning Point USA's claims, it found the "success rate to be considerably overstated. Some of the students that Turning Point USA claimed to have backed flatly condemned the organization and said they'd never spoken to anyone who works for it."

=== Campus activism ===
In 2016, Turning Point USA at Grand Valley State University filed a lawsuit against the trustees of the school. The complainants asked the court to prohibit enforcement of GVSU's Speech Zone policy and declare it a violation of the students' 1st and 14th Amendment freedoms. They have since reached a settlement. In September 2017, University of Nebraska–Lincoln lecturer Courtney Lawton was reassigned after a video was posted online showing her confronting a student recruiting for Turning Point USA.

In October 2017, several Turning Point USA student members at Kent State University conducted a protest against campus "safe space" culture, which involved members dressing up in diapers as babies. Following widespread ridicule on social media, the president of the chapter, Kaitlin Bennett, resigned, and the student-run publication KentWired.com reported that the Turning Point USA chapter at Kent State had disbanded. The chapter has since been reestablished.

In April 2023, a student chapter of Turning Point USA hosted an event at San Francisco State University featuring former NCAA swimmer Riley Gaines as a speaker. Gaines' speech campaigned to exclude trans women from women's sports. After her speech she was met with protestors, which prompted campus police to escort her to a computer room where they remained for several hours. Gaines says that she was physically assaulted twice by one person and missed her flight due to being barricaded in a classroom.

=== Recognition of campus chapters ===
At Drake University, Turning Point USA was denied recognition as an official student organization in 2016 based on student senate concerns that the organization has "a hateful record", "aggressive marketing" and "an unethical privacy concern". At Hagerstown Community College, a student's attempt to start a Turning Point USA group in 2016 was initially blocked when the school said the organization duplicated an existing group. The student's lawsuit led to the school revising its policy on student organizations, clarifying that school funded groups will be denied if they duplicate existing groups while unfunded groups face no such restriction.

In February 2017, Santa Clara University's student government voted to deny recognition for Turning Point USA as a campus organization. As of March 2017, this decision was overturned by the Vice Provost for Student Life, and Turning Point USA has been recognized as a registered student organization. Wartburg College's student senate voted to deny Turning Point USA recognition in late 2017. The chapter was forced to make changes to its constitution after initially being denied approval.

The executive board of the student union of Rensselaer Polytechnic Institute also voted on January 18, 2018, to deny the Turning Point USA chapter status as an officially recognized student organization. Wichita State University's student court overturned a decision by the Student Senate denying a Turning Point USA Chapter recognition on Campus in 2021. The student court vote was unanimous that the denial of recognition was unconstitutional.

=== Super Bowl LX ===
In 2026, the organization presented the All-American Halftime Show headlined by Kid Rock as an alternative broadcast scheduled to coincide with and rebut the Super Bowl LX halftime show headlined by Puerto Rican artist Bad Bunny.

== Media ==
In October 2020, Kirk began hosting a daily three-hour radio talk show on conservative Christian radio network Salem Media's channel, "The Answer". Turning Point USA's online audience grew from an average of 83,000 to 111,000 in 2020. A dozen social media accounts on Twitter, Facebook, and Instagram combined had more than 10 million followers online.

In September 2021, Turning Point USA launched "Turning Point Live", a three-hour streaming talk show featuring host John Root and selling "Save America" merchandise. In 2021, the Turning Point USA Productions film A Long Walk in Socialism was the Rocky Mountain Emmy Award recipient in the category Cultural/Topical documentary.

In 2022, Turning Point USA in partnership with Salem Media Group released "Border Battle", a docuseries about America's southern border. In 2025, Turning Point USA co-produced a documentary with The Daily Wire called "Identity Crisis", which "scrutinizes the radical gender ideology movement" and "the societal failures enabling the continued mutilation of children."

== United States election activities ==
=== 2016 presidential election ===
Several former employees and student volunteers for Turning Point USA claimed they had witnessed collusion between high-ranking Turning Point USA employees – including Kirk himself and top advisor Ginni Thomas – and the presidential campaigns of both Ted Cruz and Marco Rubio. The interactions included Kirk coordinating via email with two officials at a pro-Cruz super PAC to send student volunteers to work for the PAC in South Carolina, as well as two students being requested by Thomas herself, via voicemail, to distribute over 200 Cruz placards in Wisconsin. A former employee for TPUSA, who had been based in Florida, alleged that Turning Point USA had given the personal information of over 700 student supporters to an employee with Rubio's presidential campaign.

A Turning Point USA staff member wrote on Facebook that students who attended the event would have their expenses covered. The event led tax experts to say the organization's conduct may have violated its tax-exempt status, a charge disputed by Turning Point USA.

=== 2020 presidential election ===
Turning Point USA hosted Trump reelection rallies, some of them featuring Trump surrogates and some of them Trump himself.

=== January 6, 2021, "Stop the Steal" rally ===
After the 2020 election, Kirk disputed the results and denied that Trump had lost. On January 4, 2021, Kirk announced in a tweet that Turning Point Action would be sending more than 80 buses to a January 6, 2021, Trump "Stop the Steal" rally near the White House in Washington, D.C., to protest the outcome of the election. They sent seven buses with approximately 350 participants. Turning Point Action also funneled money to several "Stop the Steal" rally speakers, including Kimberly Guilfoyle, but did not organize or take part in the march to the Capitol that erupted in violence. The rally, which was attended by several thousand Trump supporters, ended in a riot and the attack at the U.S. Capitol, where Biden's win was about to be certified. Kirk later deleted the tweet and said on his podcast that it was "bad judgment" and "not wise" to enter the Capitol but not necessarily insurrectionist. A Turning Point Action spokesman later said the group condemns political violence.

== Reactions and incidents ==
In December 2017, The New Yorker published an article by Jane Mayer showcasing interviews with former minority members of TPUSA. Former staff members said they witnessed widespread discrimination against minorities in the group; "the organization was a difficult workplace and rife with tension, some of it racial," The New Yorker said. One former employee, an African-American woman, said she was the only person of color working for the organization at the time she was hired in 2014; she then said that she was fired on Martin Luther King Jr. Day. The article also said that Crystal Clanton, a leading figure in the organization who had been the group's national field director for five years, and whom Kirk had praised in his book Time for a Turning Point as "the best hire we ever could have made", had texted to another Turning Point USA employee, "I hate black people. Like fuck them all ... I hate blacks. End of story." Kirk responded to the revelations by saying that "TPUSA assessed the situation and took decisive action within 72 hours of being made aware of the issue." Justice Clarence Thomas, who hired Clanton after she left TPUSA, later commented on the incident regarding her text messages, stating, "I know Crystal Clanton and I know bigotry. Bigotry is antithetical to her nature and character."

In the Hillsdale College Collegian, opinions editor Kaylee McGhee wrote an article that referred to TPUSA as a "reactionary cancer" rather than a group supporting real conservatism that is "supposed to preserve the timeless principles of liberty and equality for all". In June 2018, conservative radio talk show host Joe Walsh resigned from the TPUSA board because Kirk was too closely tied to Donald Trump. Walsh said: "It's so important to not be beholden to politicians, but to be beholden to the issues ... When Charlie went to work for Trump, that crossed that line. You can't advance Trump and advance these issues."

During October and November 2019, Kirk launched the Culture War college tour of speaking events with appearances from many conservatives such as Donald Trump Jr., Lara Trump and Kimberly Guilfoyle. These events were frequently targeted by homophobic and antisemitic members of the alt-right and far-right who consider TPUSA to be too mainstream and not sufficiently conservative. Concerted efforts were made by this group to ask leading questions during the Q&A sections on controversial topics such as Israel and LGBTQ issues in order to challenge the extent of the speakers' views.

In November 2019, the Dartmouth Review called TPUSA an organization that promoted Kirk and Trump first, rather than conservative values. The article added "True conservatives must eventually outgrow TPUSA and devote their efforts elsewhere. We must challenge ourselves by pursuing an environment of rigorous inquiry, instead of being coddled by the intellectually devoid echo chamber of TPUSA, compromising our values for recognition."

In July 2022, neo-Nazis appeared outside of TPUSA's Student Action Summit in Tampa; they were not let in. Joy Behar of The View falsely stated that TPUSA invited and embraced neo-Nazi protesters and compared the summit to the Third Reich. The View later issued a retraction, clarifying that "Turning Point USA condemned the Neo-Nazi protesters who had 'nothing to do' with the organization." Host Whoopi Goldberg would later say, "But you let them in, and you knew what they were ... My point was metaphorical." Following these comments, TPUSA issued a cease and desist request and a deadline of July 27, asking for The View to apologize. In a later episode meeting the deadline, members of The View fully retracted the statements and apologized for making the comparisons.

=== Anti-Defamation League and Southern Poverty Law Center ===
In 2019, the Anti-Defamation League (ADL) called TPUSA an alt-lite organization. Both the ADL and the Southern Poverty Law Center have criticized TPUSA for affiliating with activists from the alt-right and the far-right. The ADL has also reported that the group's leadership and activists "have made multiple racist or bigoted comments" and have links to extremism. In 2018, the Southern Poverty Law Center's Hatewatch documented TPUSA's links to white supremacists.

=== Feud with Young America's Foundation ===
In May 2018, an internal memo written by Young America's Foundation (YAF) was leaked, in which YAF leadership warned its members to not associate with TPUSA. The memo accused TPUSA of various improprieties, such as exaggerating its number of chapters and activities around the country, taking credit for other organizations' events, increasing attendance at its own events by "boosting numbers with racists & Nazi sympathizers", and sponsoring "humiliating" campus activism events (a reference to the Kent State diaper incident).

=== COVID-19 vaccination ===
In 2021, Kirk compared Biden's vaccination efforts to an "Apartheid-style open air hostage situation", even though co-founder Bill Montgomery had died the previous year from COVID-related health complications. The organization also made misleading claims about the dangers of catching COVID-19. Kirk's spokesperson said they are not anti-vaxx, reiterating that "the vaccine makes logical sense for millions of Americans" but they should "have the freedom to choose". Charlie Kirk advocated against vaccine mandates and passports for healthy young people.

=== Finances ===
Turning Point USA receives funding from conservative and right-wing donors and foundations, including several Republican politicians. According to some sources, donors include the Ed Uihlein Family Foundation (Richard Uihlein), and Illinois Governor Bruce Rauner's family foundation. Turning Point USA also contributes money to its affiliated operational organizations, including Turning Point Endowment.

In the 2016–17 financial year, Turning Point USA reported US$8.2 million in donations to the IRS, an increase from $4.3 million the previous year. The same year, expenses for the group doubled, reaching $8.3 million, most of which were employment related costs ($4.3 million). In 2019, TPUSA's reported revenues from donors were $28.5 million, and CEO Charlie Kirk's compensation was $292,423. Turning Point USA's revenues have grown from $78,000 in 2013 to $55.8 million in 2021. In 2020, Turning Point Endowment had revenues of $16,576,350.

In August 2021, Turning Point USA distributed a "2021 Investor Prospectus" that sought to raise $43 million for its national field program, events, media, productions, special projects, Turning Point Academy, and TPUSA Faith. According to David Armiak of the Center for Media and Democracy, the prospectus employed white nationalist rhetoric by saying, "The Left's plan is a path of destruction, a turning back of the clock 500 years to a past that's deficient of Western influence." The prospectus also said, "Schools in this country have become intolerant and nihilistic dens of anti-American hate as Leftist professors slander our country with impunity and radical mobs shut down conservative speech entirely."

=== Alleged tax code violations ===
In 2017, Jane Mayer of The New Yorker described two separate actions by TPUSA staff in the 2016 election that appear to have violated campaign finance regulations. Kirk denied any wrongdoing and said it was "completely ludicrous and ridiculous that there's some sort of secret plan". TPUSA attorney Sally Wagenmaker refuted allegations of campaign finance irregularities in an article published by ProPublica in July 2020, stating that "payments to businesses belonging to organization officials 'provided a compelling operational benefit in Turning Point USA's best and other interests,' and that they were 'in full compliance with TPUSA's IRS-compliant conflict of interest policy.'"

== Turning Point organizations and affiliations ==
=== Turning Point Action ===
Turning Point Action, the campaign arm of Turning Point USA, is a 501(c)(4) organization representing right-wing and conservative perspectives. While the group claims to be a "completely separate organization" from Turning Point USA, Forbes noted that both were founded by Kirk and use common marketing and branding styles. Kirk has received income from both Turning Point USA and Turning Point Action, according to tax documents. Donors to Turning Point Action received a bumper sticker prominently featuring the URL of Turning Point USA's website; the bumper sticker was also available for purchase from Turning Point USA's web store.

It was reported in May 2019 that Kirk was "preparing to unveil" Turning Point Action as a 501(c)(4) entity allowed to target Democrats. During the 2020 U.S. presidential election campaign, Turning Point Action paid teenagers in Arizona, some of them minors, to produce thousands of posts with Turning Point USA content on their own social media accounts without disclosing their relationship with the organization.

=== TPUSA Faith ===
In 2021, Charlie Kirk founded TPUSA Faith, an organization that says it is dedicated to "recruit pastors and other church leaders to be active in local and national political issues". The organization promotes a culture war agenda and is intended to attract supporters among religious conservatives. Its activities include faith-based voter drives "and educating members on TPUSA's core values". According to TPUSA's 2021 Investor Prospectus, the program—with a budget of $6.4 million—"will 'address America's crumbling religious foundation by engaging thousands of pastors nationwide' in order to 'breathe renewed civic engagement into our churches'".

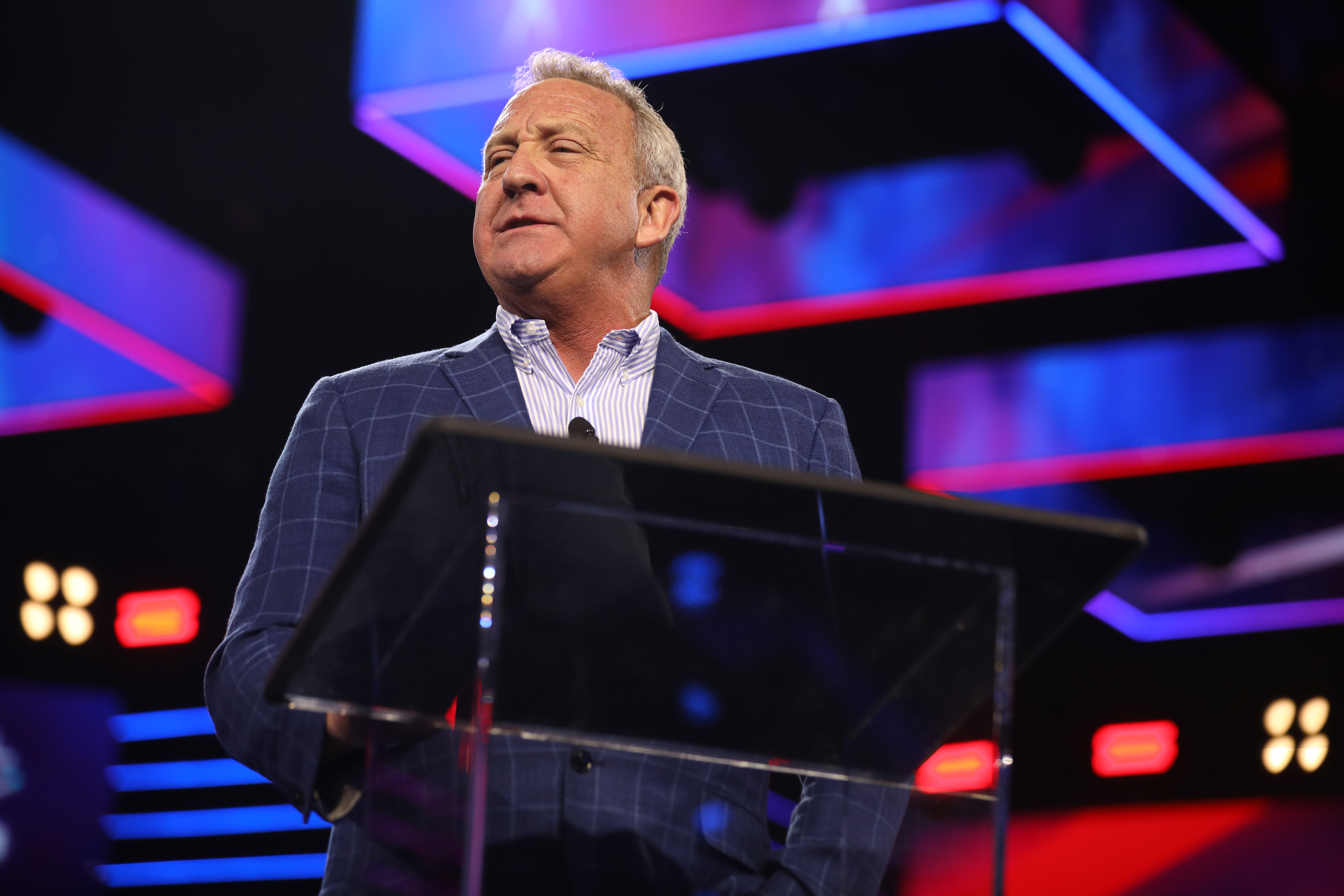
Rob McCoy in December 2023 at AmericaFest

Charlie Kirk's pastor, Rob McCoy, is credited with helping launch TPUSA Faith. He is a Pentecostal pastor in the Calvary Chapel Association and aligned with the Christian right. McCoy encouraged Kirk to amalgamate Christianity and social conservatism.

=== Turning Point Endowment ===
Turning Point Endowment Inc. is a self-described "supporting organization" whose "mission is to support and benefit Turning Point USA's charitable purposes and long-term vitality".

=== Turning Point Academy ===
In 2021, TPUSA announced Turning Point Academy as an online academy for "families seeking an 'America-first education'". Plans to develop a curriculum with StrongMind, the firm that owns Arizona charter school Primavera Online High School, were abandoned when StrongMind's key subcontractor, the Freedom Learning Group, an education company run by military spouses and veterans, terminated the contract after finding out that the client was TPUSA.

=== Club America ===
On July 22, 2025, TPUSA announced "Club America", made up of high school chapters which would promote TPUSA and bring in conservative speakers once a semester to speak to students.

On October 27, 2025, Florida Governor Ron DeSantis announced he would be partnering with TPUSA to bring Club America chapters to high schools throughout Florida. Texas Governor Greg Abbott also announced that he would expand Club America chapters into every Texas high school and warned that any school officials who disallow chapters should be reported to the Texas Education Agency.

According to its website, Club America has more than 1,200 chapters.

=== Turning Point UK ===
Turning Point UK is a British offshoot of the American student pressure group Turning Point USA. The UK group was set up to promote right-wing politics in UK schools, colleges and universities, with the stated aim of countering what Turning Point UK alleges are the left-wing politics of UK educational institutions. It was launched in London in December 2018 by Charlie Kirk and Candace Owens.

=== Turning Point Australia ===
Turning Point Australia is a Sydney-based Australian offshoot of TPUSA, founded by Joel Jammal in 2022–3, who continues as its national director. It was set up on the recommendation of Nigel Farage, leader of Reform UK, and approved by Kirk. It was first registered as a limited company on January 20, 2023. Its website states that it is affiliated with and licensed by Turning Point USA under a branding agreement, but is an independent grassroots organisation run by and for Australians.

== See also ==
- Campus Reform – US conservative news website
- Conservative Political Action Conference – Annual meeting in the US and other countries
- David Horowitz Freedom Center – Non-profit organisation in the USA
- Family Research Council – American evangelical activist group
- Kyle Kashuv – American conservative activist (born 2001)
- Leadership Institute – US nonprofit educational organization
- Samantha Fulnecky essay controversy – Incident about a college essay in the US, involving TPUSA
- Young Americans for Liberty – American libertarian organization
