= Furnari (surname) =

Furnari is a surname. Notable people with the surname include:

- Christopher Furnari (1924–2018), American mobster
- Eva Furnari (born 1948), Italian–Brazilian author and illustrator
- Garry Furnari (born 1954), American judge and politician
- Sergio Furnari (born 1969), Italian-American artist and sculptor.

== See also ==
- Funari
