= Sergio Furnari =

Italian-American sculptor (born 1969)

- Born: 1969 (age 56–57); Caltagirone, Sicily, Italy
- Occupation: Artist
- Known for: sculpture, painting, ceramic art
- Website: www.sergiofurnari.com

Sergio Furnari (born 1969) is an Italian-American artist and sculptor based in New York.

== Career ==
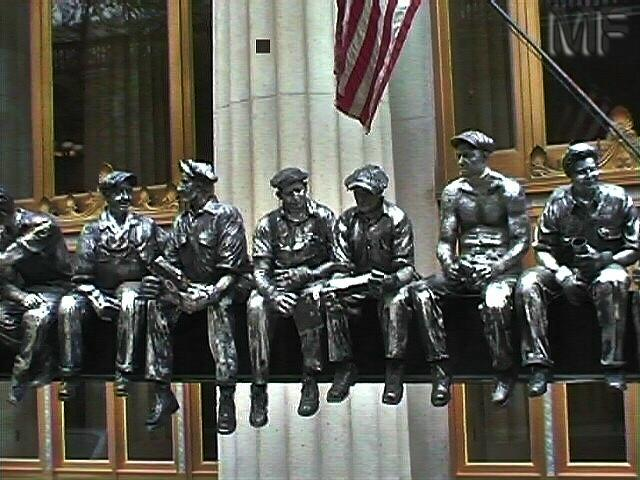
Furnari's statue of construction workers in January 2007

Furnari was born in Caltagirone, Sicily. His work has been displayed in exhibitions including the Venice Biennale, and has been featured in publications such as The New York Times. Furnari migrated to New York in 1991. He has built sculptures of a number of public figures, including Portuguese footballer Cristiano Ronaldo and U.S. president Donald Trump.

Furnari is best known for his statue of construction workers, which he built after 9/11 based on the 1923 photograph Lunch atop a Skyscraper by Charles C Ebbets. One of his sculptured workers was stolen in January 2007 and found later in July.

He displayed a statue in honor of COVID-19 healthcare workers in multiple places in Washington, D.C., in 2021. It was built in collaboration with Z-Burger owner Peter Tabibian. Furnari built another sculpture of a heart in honor of COVID-19 healthcare workers and placed it at the Grand Army Plaza, New York, in the same year. The monument was later removed for lacking a permit, which Furnari conceded.

He stated that he intended to have YouTuber creator Jimmy Donaldson (MrBeast) attend the display of Ronaldo's metal statue in Greenville, South Carolina, in 2025. He said that "If he would have seen my statue, I can assure you he would have come out of his office." Donaldson did not attend the display, and the police was called twice to ask him to move the statue. He said that he had not contacted local authorities before arriving at the city.

=== Freedom statue ===
Furnari built a statue called Freedom in honor of deceased conservative activist Charlie Kirk in 2026, which is scheduled to be displayed in Times Square on September 10. His work cost him $100,000, plus an additional sum of over $1,000 that he received on Christian crowdfunding website GiveSendGo. He said that he had expected to raise "millions" of dollars for the project (including an initial sum of over $150,000 from crowdfunding) with the support of wealthy donors. Furnari broke his foot during the sculpturing and spent much of the money on steel and resin.

Furnari has stated that he "wasn’t a fan of Charlie", adding that "one thing that I couldn’t stand about him while he was alive [was] when he was talking about Palestine. [Kirk would say]: ‘Oh no, Palestine doesn’t exist.’ I thought: 'Well, this guy must be out of his mind.'". He said the statue was intended to "glorify and to exercise the first amendment, this freedom of speech". According to Furnari, he "has been inundated by messages from people saying they intend to urinate on the sculpture".

He lamented not receiving as much funding as he expected for the project, stating that "nobody is really coming up with support, especially financial support. So far I’ve spent all my money on this." According to the project's fundraising page, Furnari had "sold his own apartment to fund this project" and "Sadily[,] none of the politicians/entrepreneurs/supporters have contacted him." He said that "Things financially are a total, absolute nightmare. [...] People are cheap, man." He stated to The Guardian, referring to the statue: "Is it cursed? Maybe. I don’t know."

Furnari had previously built another statue of Kirk and displayed it in Indiana, where it was vandalized. As of July 2026, he had not managed to sell it.
