= Ebbets =

Ebbets is a surname. Notable people with the surname include:

- Charles Ebbets (1859–1925), American sports executive
- Charles C. Ebbets (1905–1978), American photographer
- William H. Ebbets (1825–1890), American politician
- John Ebbetts (or Ebbets), namesake of Ebbetts Pass

== See also ==
- Ebbets Field, a former baseball park in Brooklyn, New York
- Ebbett, a similar surname
