= Lunch atop a Skyscraper =

1932 photograph of workers atop the steelwork of the RCA Building

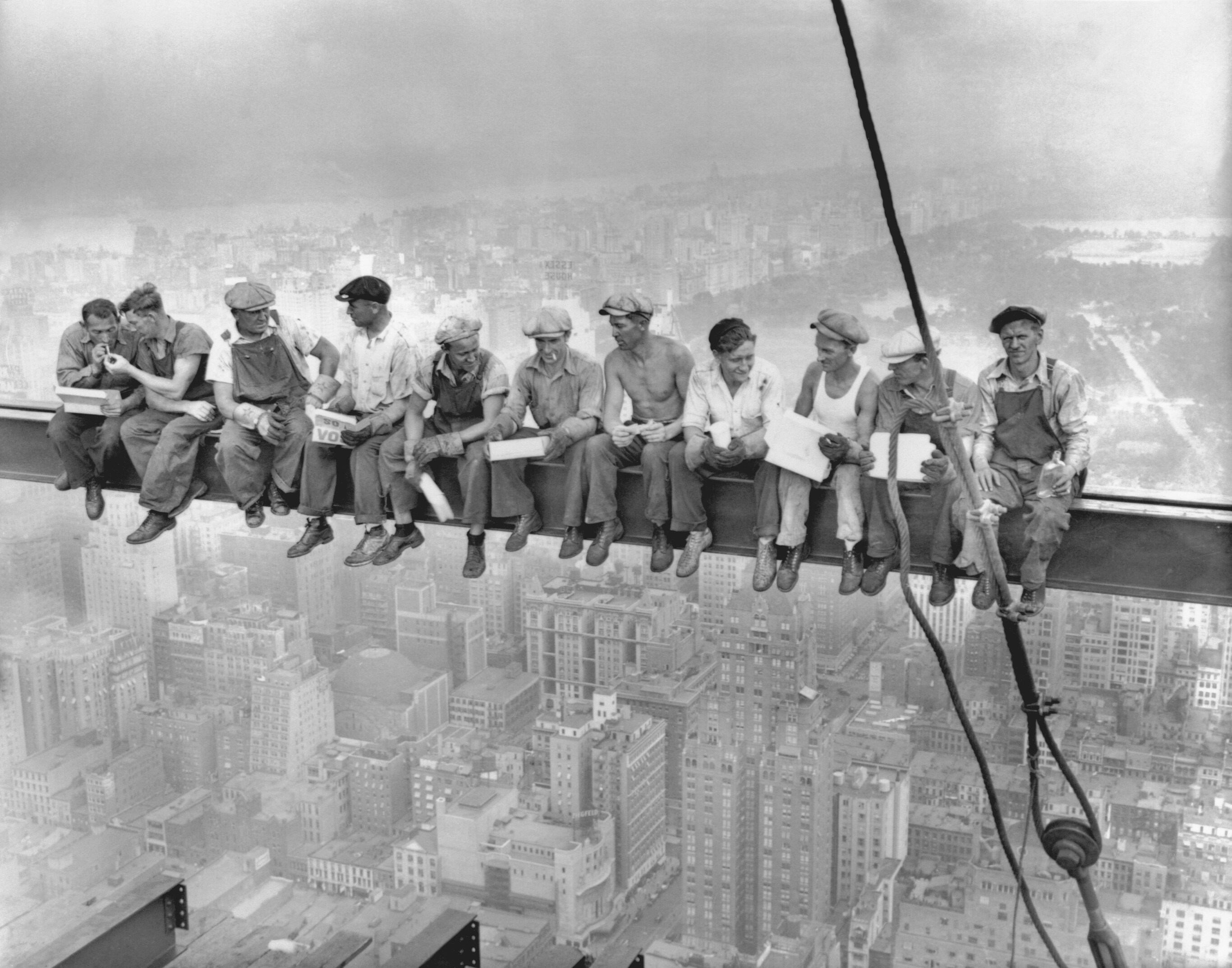
Lunch atop a Skyscraper, 1932

Lunch atop a Skyscraper is a black-and-white photograph taken on September 20, 1932, of eleven ironworkers sitting on a steel beam of the RCA Building, 850 feet (260 meters) above the ground during the construction of Rockefeller Center in Manhattan, New York City. It was a staged photograph arranged as a publicity stunt, part of a campaign promoting the skyscraper.

The photographic negative is in the Bettmann Archive. The image is often misattributed to Lewis Hine, but the identity of the actual photographer remains unclear. Evidence emerged indicating it may have been taken by Charles C. Ebbets, but it was later found that other photographers had been present at the shoot as well. Many claims have been made regarding the identities of the men in the image, though only a few have been definitively identified. Ken Johnston, manager of the historic collections of Corbis, called the image "a piece of American history".

== Description ==
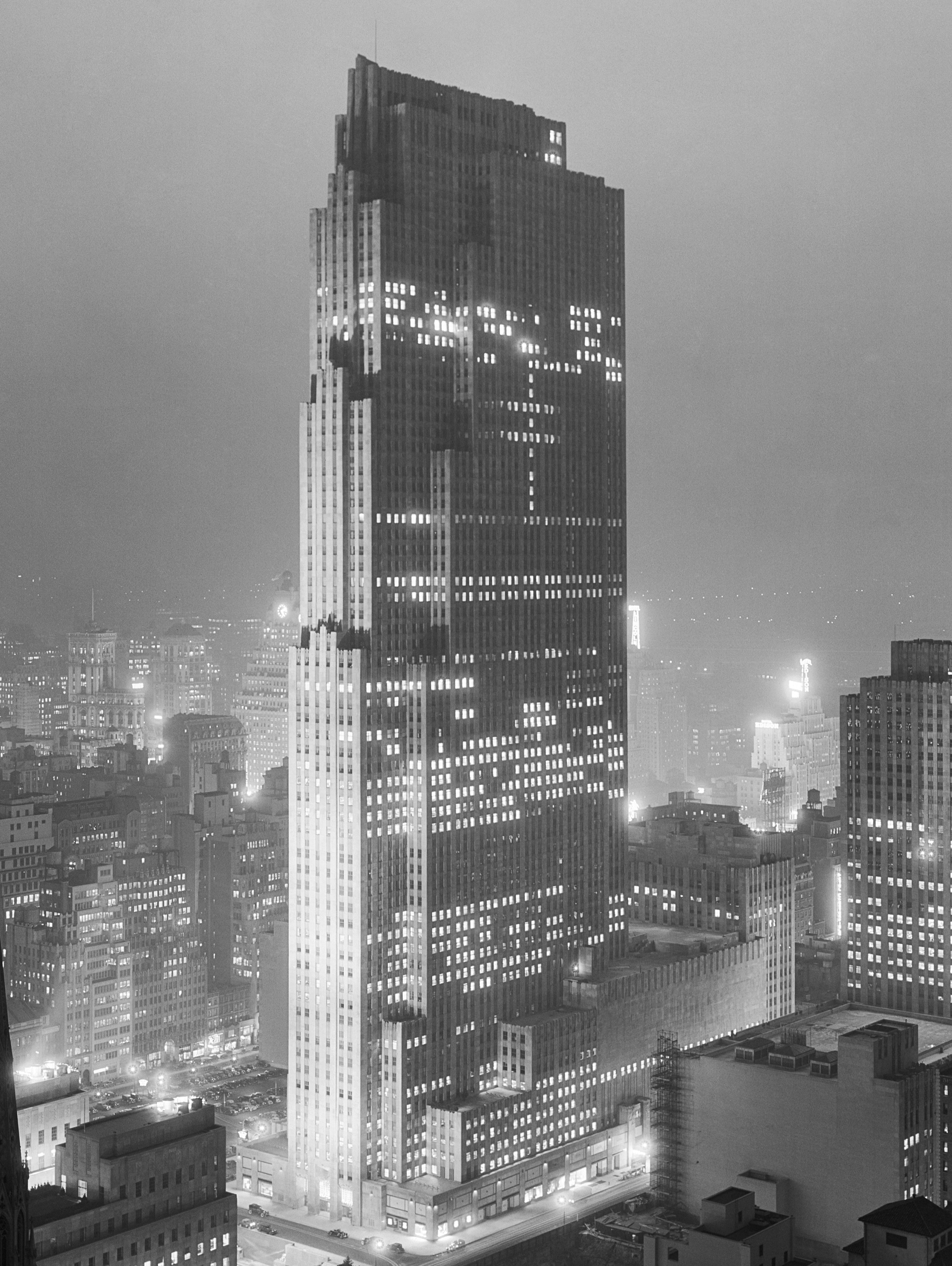
The RCA Building in December 1933 during the construction of Rockefeller Center

The photograph depicts eleven men eating lunch while sitting on a steel beam 850 feet (260 meters) above the ground on the sixty-ninth floor of the near-completed RCA Building (now known as 30 Rockefeller Plaza) at Rockefeller Center in Manhattan, New York City, on September 20, 1932. These men were immigrant ironworkers employed at the RCA Building during the construction of Rockefeller Center. They were accustomed to walking along the girders. The photograph was taken as part of a campaign promoting the skyscraper. Other photographs taken depict the workers throwing a football and pretending to sleep on the girder. Central Park is visible in the background.

== History ==
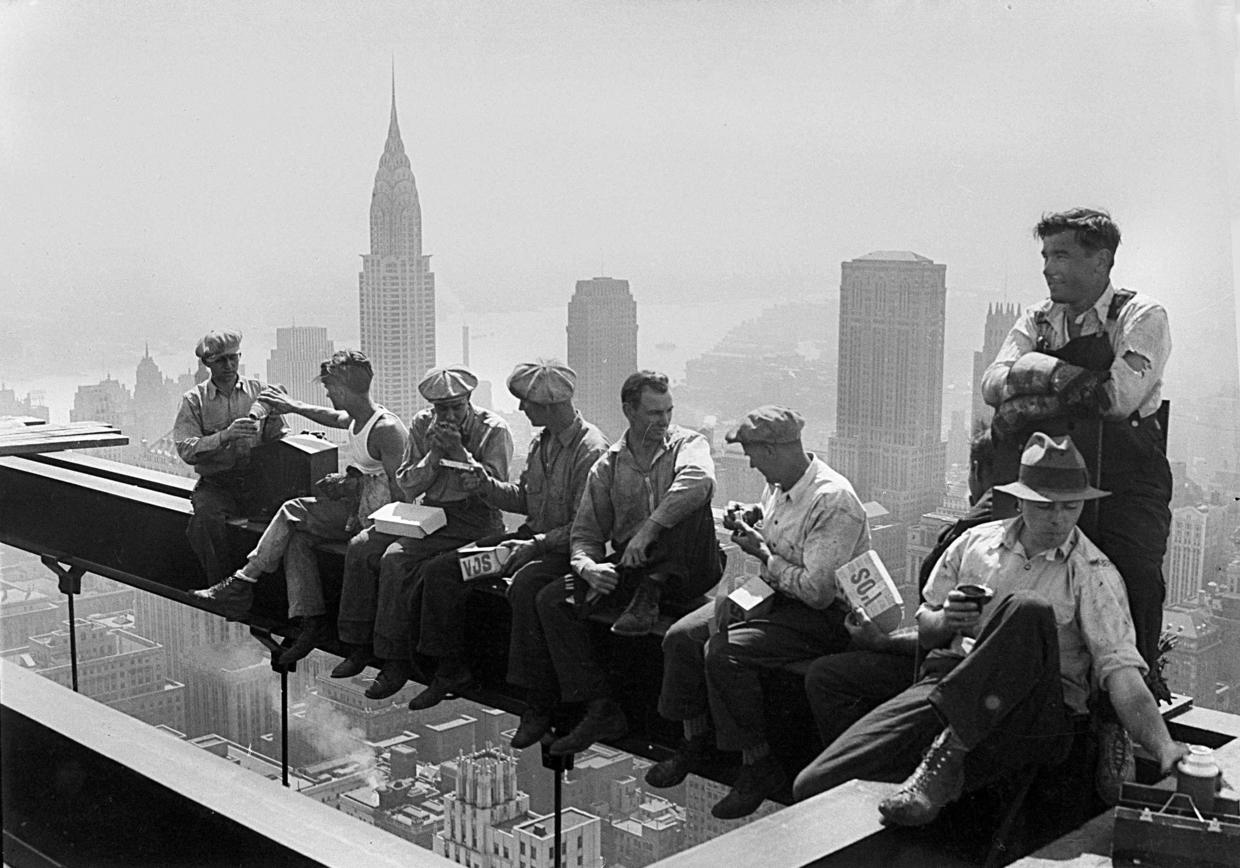
Another image from the same publicity shoot

The photograph was distributed by Acme Newspictures and was published in newspapers as early as September 30, 1932. It was published in the Sunday supplement of the New York Herald Tribune on October 2, 1932, with the caption: "Lunch Atop a Skyscraper".

In 1995, Corbis Images, a company that provides archived images to professional photographers, bought a collection of over eleven million images called the Bettmann Archive. The Lunch atop a Skyscraper photograph was in the Acme Newspictures archive, a part of the Bettmann collection, although it was uncredited. According to Ken Johnston, manager of the historic collections of Corbis, the image was initially received in a Manila paper envelope. The original glass negative of the photograph had broken into five pieces. It is stored in a humidity and temperature-controlled preservation facility at the Iron Mountain storage facility in Pennsylvania.

In 2016, an affiliate of Visual China Group purchased Corbis's image division and content licensing unit, including the Bettman Archive and Lunch atop a Skyscraper. Visual China Group licenses the photograph internationally through an agreement with Getty Images.

== Identification ==
=== Photographer ===
The identity of the photographer is unknown. It was often misattributed to Lewis Hine, a Works Progress Administration photographer, from the mistaken assumption that the structure being built is the Empire State Building. In 1998, Tami Ebbets Hahn, a resident of Wilmington, North Carolina, noticed a poster of the image and speculated that it was one of her father's (Charles C. Ebbets; 1905–1978) photographs.

In 2003, she contacted Johnston. Corbis hired Marksmen Inc., a private investigation firm, to find the photographer. An investigator discovered an article from The Washington Post, which credited the image to Hamilton Wright. The Wright family, however, was not familiar with the photograph. It was common for Wright to receive credit for photographs taken by those working for him; Hahn's father had worked for the Hamilton Wright Features syndicate.

In 1932, Ebbets was appointed the photographic director of Rockefeller Centre, responsible for publicising the new skyscraper. Hahn found her father's paycheck of $1.50 per hour (equivalent to $35 per hour in 2025), the ironworkers photograph, and an image of her father with a camera, which appeared to be of the same place and time. Analyzing the evidence, Johnston said: "As far as I'm concerned, he's the photographer." Corbis later acknowledged Ebbets's authorship. It was later discovered that photographers Thomas Kelley, William Leftwich, and Ebbets were present there on that day. Due to the uncertain identity of the photographer, the image is again without credit.

=== Ironworkers ===
According to a New York Post survey, numerous claims have been made regarding the identities of the men in the image. The 2012 documentary Men at Lunch investigated claims that two of the men were Irish immigrants, and the director reported in 2013 that he planned to follow up on other claims from Swedish relatives. The film confirms the identities of two men: Joseph Eckner, third from the left, and Joe Curtis, third from the right, by cross-referencing with other pictures taken the same day, in which they were named at the time.

The first man on the right, holding a bottle, has been identified as Slovak worker Gustáv (Gusti) Popovič. The photograph was found in his estate, with the note "Don't you worry, my dear Mariška, as you can see I'm still with bottle" written on the back.

The sixth person from the left is claimed to be Peter Rice, Mohawk construction worker, great grandfather of Burton Rice, of Rice Mohawk Steel company. The photograph was produced in court to illustrate the expertise of the Rice family and the Mohawks in general in working with steel at height.

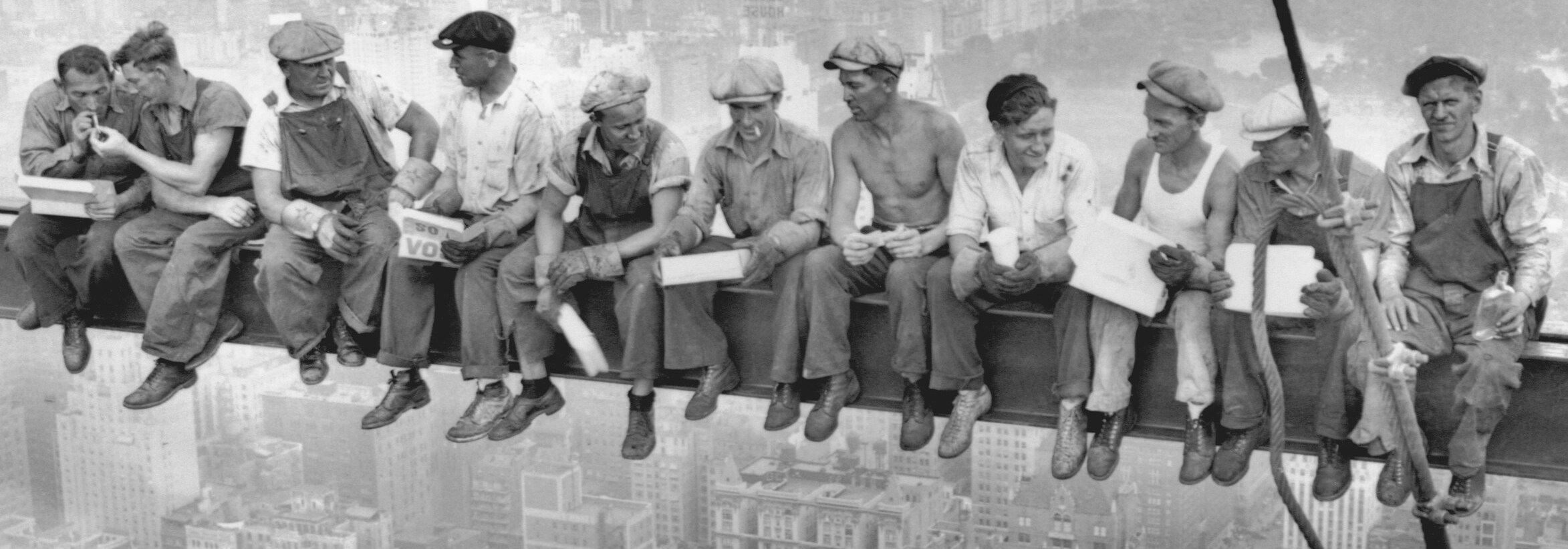

== Legacy ==
The photograph has been referred to as the "most famous picture of a lunch break in New York history" by Ashley Cross, a correspondent of the New York Post. It has been used and imitated in many artworks, and has been colorized. Sculptor Sergio Furnari modeled from it a 40-foot-long (12 m) statue, which was displayed near the World Trade Center site after the September 11 attacks. The image has been a best seller for its licensors.

Although critics have dismissed the photograph as a publicity stunt, Johnston called it "a piece of American history". Taken during the Great Depression, the photograph became an icon of New York City and has often been re-created by construction workers. Time included the image in its 2016 list of the 100 most influential images. Discussing the significance of the image in 2012, Johnston said:

There's the incongruity between the action – lunch – and the place – 800 feet in the air – and that these guys are so casual about it. It's visceral: I've had people tell me they have trouble looking at it out of fear of heights. And these men – you feel you get a very strong sense of their characters through their expressions, clothes and poses.

During his tenure as manager of Manchester United, Sir Alex Ferguson kept the photograph in his Carrington office as a motivational tool for his players. Ferguson regarded the picture as the ultimate portrayal of "what a football team is and has to do," emphasizing that "one slip could mean disaster for more than one man".

The photograph also inspired a ride called the Beam, which opened on the 69th-floor terrace of the former RCA Building in December 2023.

When Time magazine named "The Architects of AI" the 2025 Person of the Year, a cover composite was created that was based on the photo but with the workers replaced by CEOs of AI companies.

== See also ==
- List of photographs considered the most important

== Works cited ==
=== English sources ===
- Anderson, John (November 8, 2012). "How a Galway Pub Led to a Skyscraper". The New York Times. Archived from the original on February 1, 2022.
- Contrera, Jessica (September 1, 2019). "One of the most iconic photos of American workers is not what it seems". The Washington Post. Archived from the original on November 21, 2020.
- Cross, Ashley (October 26, 2003). "Up in the Air; Mystery Deepens in Old Pic". New York Post.
- [The Daily Telegraph] (September 20, 2012). "Lunch Atop a Skyscraper: Iconic American photo is 80 years old". The Daily Telegraph.
- Gambino, Megan (September 19, 2012). "Lunch Atop a Skyscraper Photograph: The Story Behind the Famous Shot". Smithsonian. ISSN 0037-7333.
- Hotz, Amy (November 10, 2003). "A Photo Finished". Star-News. Archived from the original on October 3, 2013.
- Lee, Jennifer 8. (January 18, 2007). "A Mobile Work of Art Is Missing an Ironworker". The New York Times. Archived from the original on November 4, 2014.
- Parente, Audrey (March 5, 2012). "Ormond Woman, Daughter Document Legacy". The Daytona Beach News-Journal.
- Perkins, Corinne (September 20, 2012). "Protecting an Iconic Image". Reuters. Archived from the original on September 22, 2012.
- Pollak, Michael (March 9, 2012). "Answers to Questions About New York". The New York Times. Archived from the original on January 19, 2022.
- Tauranac, John (2018). Manhattan's Little Secrets: Uncovering Mysteries in Brick and Mortar, Glass and Stone. Globe Pequot Press. ISBN 978-1-4930-3048-4.
- [Time] (November 28, 2016). Lunch Atop a Skyscraper: The Story Behind The 1932 Photo. Time (Video) – via YouTube. "The image first appeared in the New York Herald Tribune on October 2nd, 1932."
- [Time, Inc.] (2016). 100 Photographs: The Most Influential Images of All Time. Time Inc. ISBN 978-1-61893-507-6 – via Google Books.

=== Non-English sources ===
- Bergström, Håkan (January 5, 2013). "Högt över New York satt bondpojkarna från Okome" [High above New York sat the peasant boys from Okome]. Hallandsposten (in Swedish). "Irländaren Seán Ó Cualáin har precis gjort en film om bilden, Men at Lunch, där han med olika grad av visshet har identifierat några av byggjobbarna som irländska immigranter ... Vi mejlar honom ... Svaret kommer rätt omgående: 'Nej, de två du nämner har vi ingen aning om vilka de är. Stålarbetarna var ofta irländare, indianer (Native Americans), skandinaver och newfoundländare. Så ett svenskt anspråk är trovärdigt.' ... Vi vill gärna åka till Sverige och träffa dina kontakter, förmodligen i slutet av 2013 eller början av 2014. [The Irishman Seán Ó Cualáin has just made a film about the film, Men at Lunch, where he with varying degrees of certainty has identified some of the construction workers as Irish immigrants ... We email him ... The answer comes right away: 'No, the two you mention, we have no idea who they are. The steelworkers were often Irish, Native Americans, Scandinavians and Newfoundlanders. So a Swedish claim is credible.' ... We would like to go to Sweden and meet your contacts, probably at the end of 2013 or the beginning of 2014.]"
- [EITB] (March 10, 2021). "Un vasco, entre los trabajadores de la icónica foto del Rockefeller Center" [A Basque, among the workers of the iconic photo of Rockefeller Center]. EITB. "Natxo Ibarguen Moneta es uno de los trabajadores que aparecen en la famosa foto de 1932 'Lunch atop a skyscraper' (Almuerzo sobre un rascacielos) [Natxo Ibarguen Moneta is one of the workers who appears in the famous 1932 photo 'Lunch atop a Skyscraper']"
- [iDNES.cz] (October 1, 2013). "Oběd na vrcholu mrakodrapu: jak to opravdu bylo" [Lunch at the top of the skyscraper: How it really was]. iDNES.cz (in Czech). Mafra. "Také Popovič má totiž důkaz in memoriam. V pozůstalosti po něm zůstala právě ta fotka, o níž je řeč, a na zadní straně bylo napsáno: 'Nič še ty neboj, moja milá Mariška, jak vidziš, ta ja furt s fľašečku. Tvoj Gusti.' [Popovič also has proof in memoriam. The picture in question remained in his estate, and it was written on the back: 'Don't worry, my dear Mariska, as you can see, I'm still with a bottle. Your Gusti.']"
- Perrier, Frédéric (2013). ""Lunch Atop a Skyscraper" : le cliché mythique fête ses 80 ans" ['Lunch Atop a Skyscraper': the mythical cliché celebrates its 80th anniversary]. Transatlantica (in French) (1). doi:10.4000/transatlantica.5788. ISSN 1765-2766 – via Journals.openedition.org. "C'est l'image la plus vendue de l'agence fondée en 1989 par Bill Gates, Corbis Image, qui, pour l'occasion, a fait de surprenantes révélations. [This is the best-selling image from the agency founded in 1989 by Bill Gates, Corbis Image, which, for the occasion, made some surprising revelations.]"
