= Charlie Kirk American Heritage Act =

Proposed Ohio law

Ohio General Assembly
- Long title: To amend sections 3314.03, 3326.11, and 3328.24 and to enact sections 3320.09, 3320.10, and 3320.11 of the Revised Code to enact the Charlie Kirk American Heritage Act to permit teachers in public schools and state institutions of higher education to provide instruction on the influence of Judeo-Christian values on history and culture.
- Enacted by: Ohio House of Representatives
- Enacted: November 19, 2025
- Considered by: Ohio Senate

Legislative history

Initiating chamber: Ohio House of Representatives
- Introduced: September 29, 2025
- Third reading: November 19, 2025
- Voting summary: 62 voted for; 27 voted against

Revising chamber: Ohio Senate
- Received from the Ohio House of Representatives: November 25, 2025
- First reading: November 25, 2025
- Status: Pending

The Charlie Kirk American Heritage Act, formally known as Ohio House Bill 486, is a proposed 2025 law in the U.S. state of Ohio that declares schools and teachers "may provide instruction on the positive impacts of religion on American history". The bill passed in the Ohio House of Representatives on November 19, 2025, and as of December 2025 is awaiting a vote in the Ohio Senate.

House Bill 486 is named after Charlie Kirk, an American right-wing activist and commentator who was assassinated on September 10, 2025. One of the two main House sponsors of the bill, Representative Gary Click, named it after Charlie Kirk because he believed he was killed because of his beliefs, including his religion.

== Legislative history ==
The Charlie Kirk American Heritage Act was introduced in the Ohio House as House Bill 486 by state representatives Gary Click and Mike Dovilla. The bill passed the Ohio House on November 19, 2025, in a 62–27 vote along party lines, with no Democrats voting in favor of passage.

== Provisions ==
House Bill 486 does not explicitly require instruction involving religion, but allows school to provide that instruction if they choose as such. The bill specifies specific topics that would be allowed to be taught in the classroom, including about John Witherspoon, Billy Graham, and other similar topics.
