= Freedom (statue) =

Statue in New York City

- Statue of Charlie Kirk
- The statue in July 2026
- Artist: Sergio Furnari
- Year: 2026
- Completion date: July 17, 2026
- Medium: Steel and resin
- Subject: Charlie Kirk
- Dimensions: (6'5 in)
- Condition: On display
- Location: New York City

Freedom, or the Statue of Charlie Kirk, is a life-size statue built by Italian-American artist Sergio Furnari to honor the late right-wing political activist Charlie Kirk after his assassination on September 10, 2025. The statue was temporarily placed on display in Manhattan in Times Square on the first anniversary of his death, with Furnari hoping to find a buyer so it could be permanently installed somewhere or privately kept. At the announcement that the statue would be unveiled on the anniversary of Kirk's death, it was ridiculed on social media, with people threatening to harm the statue once it was displayed.

== History ==
On September 10, 2025, right-wing political activist Charlie Kirk was assassinated during a campus debate at Utah Valley University in Orem, Utah. Following his death, he was revered by Republicans and young conservatives. In July 2026, Italian artist Sergio Furnari announced his creation of the Charlie Kirk statue, created in Kirk's honor after his death. Even though Furnari did not agree with some of Kirk's views, he said that his reason for its creation was that he wanted to exercise the First Amendment right of freedom of speech. Furnari found out about Kirk's assassination when his daughter ran into his room while he was still in bed and told him that Kirk had been assassinated, Furnari said that, "I would say, saddened by it." Furnari also said that he "wasn't a fan" of Kirk and didn't agree with him on "certain issues".

=== Unveiling ===
The statue was put on display in Times Square in New York City on September 10, 2026, on the anniversary of Kirk's assassination. Furnari stated that he wanted to put the statue up at the exact minute Kirk had been assassinated a year earlier. Furnari invited New York City mayor Zohran Mamdani to the statue's unveiling, but he did not show up. Following the unveiling of the statue, a crowd marched through Times Square chanting "They couldn't kill us all!" and "We stand for Charlie Kirk!", among other chants. A fight between supporters and protesters broke out during the march, with people having heated exchanges and shouting matches. Shortly after the altercations, some of Kirk's supporters got out of a cab and were heckled with such comments as "Nazis are losers".

Charlie Kirk, the subject the statue pays tribute to

== Depiction ==
The statue depicts Charlie Kirk, a right-wing political activist. Kirk is depicted sitting down holding a microphone up to his mouth with his left hand and his right hand is resting on his right leg. Kirk is wearing his "FREEDOM" shirt he wore the day of his assassination.

== Finances ==
Furnari is said to have invested $100,000 of his own money in building the statue. He said that he expects the wealthy to donate money to him, although no one has done so yet. He put up a fundraising campaign on the Christian crowdfunding platform GiveSendGo. The crowdfunding page stated that he had to sell his own apartment and that "none of the politicians/entrepreneurs/supporters have contacted him." As of August 2026, he had raised over $9,000. In an interview with The Guardian in July, Furnari blamed the people for why his statue did not sell, and said that he "knows lots of people out there, and everybody's so cheap". Furnari also said, "Is it cursed? Maybe. I don't know."

== Reception ==
After the announcement of the monument for Kirk, people online made fun of the statue, threatening to urinate on or vandalize the statue once it was unveiled in New York. Some of Charlie Kirk's supporters noted that it looks nothing like him. Furnari said to USA Today that "I would never be an instigator, especially with my artwork; it's not made for that." People speculated online that football player Nick Bosa had visited the statue while getting ready for training camp, which later turned out to be false. Threats of vandalizing the statue were made again hours before the statue was put on display, and Furnari defended it, saying, "You should have a little bit of empathy".
