= Funaro =

Funaro is a surname. Notable people with the surname include:

- Dilson Funaro (1933–1989), Brazilian businessman and politician
- Frank Funaro (born 1958), American drummer
- Robert Funaro (born 1959), American actor

== See also ==
- Funari
