= Ebbett =

Ebbett is a surname. Notable people with the surname include:

- Andrew Ebbett (born 1983), Canadian ice hockey player
- Arthur Ebbett (1866–1929), Canadian lawyer and politician

== See also ==
- Ebbets
