= Funari =

Funari is a surname. Notable people with the surname include:

- Gianfranco Funari (1932–2008), Italian writer, television host, stand-up comedian, and actor
- Vicky Funari, American documentarist

== See also ==
- Funaro
- Santa Caterina dei Funari, a church in Rome, Italy
