= Charlie Kirk =

American political activist (1993–2025)

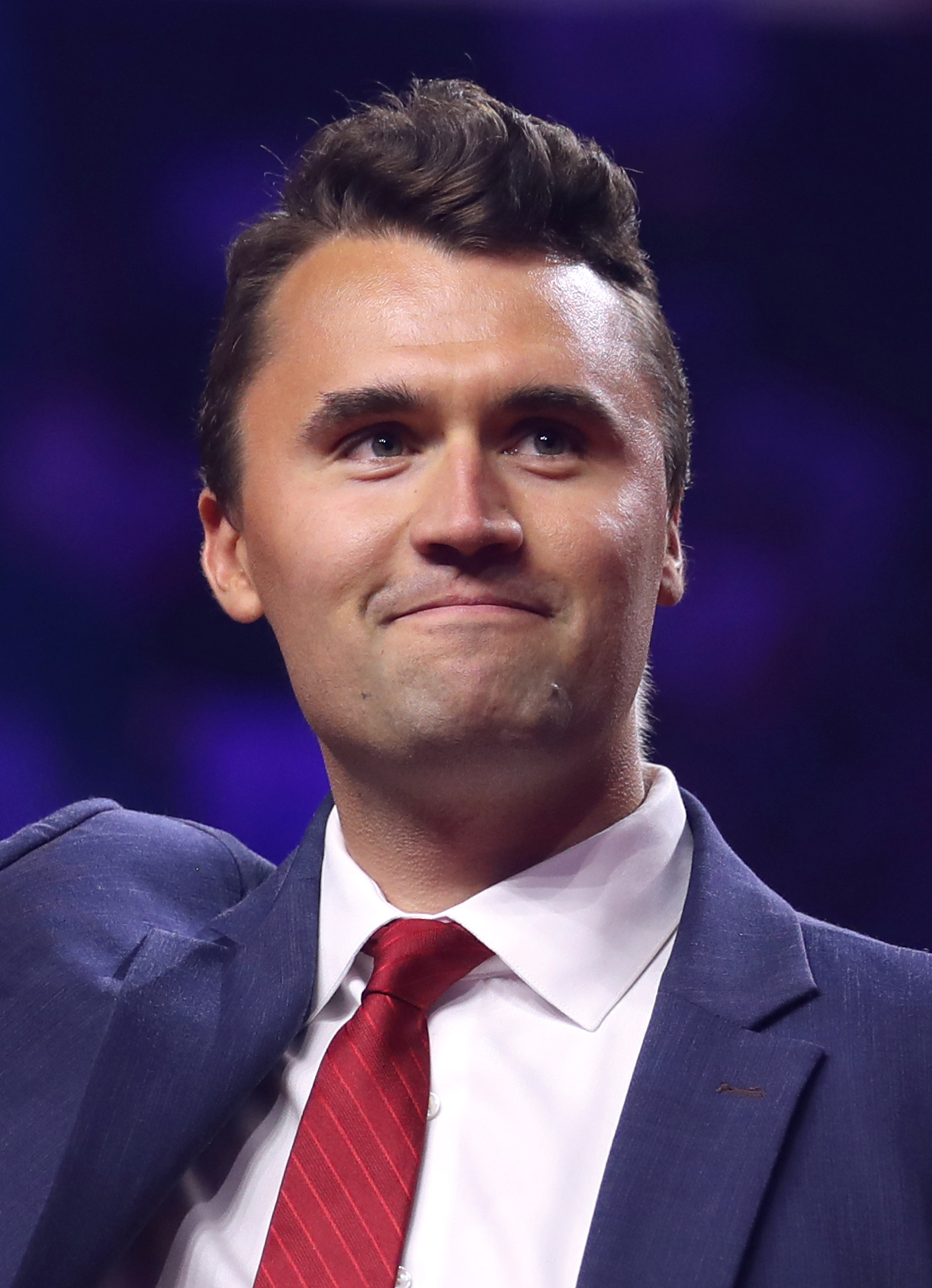
- Kirk in 2024
- Born: Charles James Kirk; October 14, 1993; Arlington Heights, Illinois, U.S.
- Died: September 10, 2025 (aged 31); Orem, Utah, U.S.
- Cause of death: Assassination by shooting
- Occupations: Author; nonprofit executive; media personality; organizer
- Years active: 2012–2025
- Known for: Political activism
- Title: Founder and CEO of Turning Point USA; Founder of Turning Point Action
- Successor: Erika Kirk
- Political party: Republican
- Movement: Conservatism; Christian nationalism; Trumpism
- Spouse: Erika Frantzve (m. 2021)
- Children: 2
- Parents: Kathryn Smith (mother); Robert Kirk (father)
- Relatives: Carroll N. Kirk (great-grandfather)
- Awards: Presidential Medal of Freedom (2025, posthumous)
- Kirk's voice Kirk on what the Bible says about money Recorded August 24, 2023
- Website: www.charliekirk.com

Charles James Kirk (October 14, 1993 – September 10, 2025) was an American right-wing political activist and media personality. He founded the conservative student organization Turning Point USA (TPUSA) with Bill Montgomery in 2012 and served as its executive director until his assassination in 2025. A key ally of Donald Trump, Kirk became one of the most prominent voices in the Make America Great Again (MAGA) movement, publishing several books and hosting The Charlie Kirk Show.

Born and raised in the Chicago suburbs of Arlington Heights and Prospect Heights, Kirk became politically active in high school. He briefly attended college before dropping out to focus on building TPUSA. The project later expanded into affiliate groups such as Turning Point Action and Turning Point Faith. Kirk's activism centered on mobilizing conservative students and promoting Republican causes nationwide.

Kirk advocated for a range of conservative positions, including opposition to abortion, gun control, DEI programs, and LGBTQ rights. Over time, he aligned with the Christian right and advocated for Christian nationalism. His more controversial positions included criticism of the Civil Rights Act of 1964 and Martin Luther King Jr., as well as promotion of COVID-19 misinformation, false allegations of electoral fraud in 2020, and the white genocide conspiracy theory.

On September 10, 2025, Kirk was fatally shot by a rooftop sniper while speaking at a TPUSA debate event at Utah Valley University. His assassination drew international attention and condemnation of political violence, while also sparking partisan dispute. On September 21, almost 100,000 people attended his memorial service at State Farm Stadium in Glendale, Arizona.

== Early life ==
Charles James Kirk was born on October 14, 1993, in the Chicago suburb of Arlington Heights, Illinois, to Robert Willard Kirk and Kathryn Smith Kirk (née Smith), and raised in the nearby city of Prospect Heights. His father is an architect who was involved in the construction of Trump Tower. His mother is a former trader at the Chicago Mercantile Exchange who subsequently worked as a mental health counselor. He had one younger sister, Mary, who went on to become an art curator in Chicago.

Kirk described his parents as moderate Republicans. They were active in conservative circles, and his father was a major donor to the Mitt Romney 2012 presidential campaign. Raised in the Presbyterian Church, Kirk was a member of the Boy Scouts of America and earned the rank of Eagle Scout. He experienced a political awakening in middle school, during which he read books by economist Milton Friedman and became more attracted to the principles of the Republican Party.

In 2010, during his junior year at Wheeling High School, Kirk volunteered for the successful U.S. Senate campaign of Illinois Republican Mark Kirk (no relation). Also during his junior year, he began listening to The Rush Limbaugh Show, a prominent conservative talk radio broadcast. In his senior year, he initiated a boycott of cookies at the school's cafeteria to reverse a price increase. He also wrote an essay for Breitbart News alleging liberal bias in high-school textbooks; it led to his first media appearance on Fox Business at age 17.

In 2012, Kirk applied to West Point but was rejected. Although he was accepted that same year to Baylor University in Waco, Texas, he enrolled instead at Harper College, a community college in Palatine, Illinois. Withdrawing after one semester, he left Harper to concentrate on his work with Turning Point USA, the political group he co-founded with conservative businessman and mentor Bill Montgomery. In 2015, Kirk enrolled part-time at King's College in New York City, taking online classes. Kirk did not receive a college degree during his lifetime, a fact he noted in debates with academics and students.

== Organizations ==
=== Turning Point USA ===
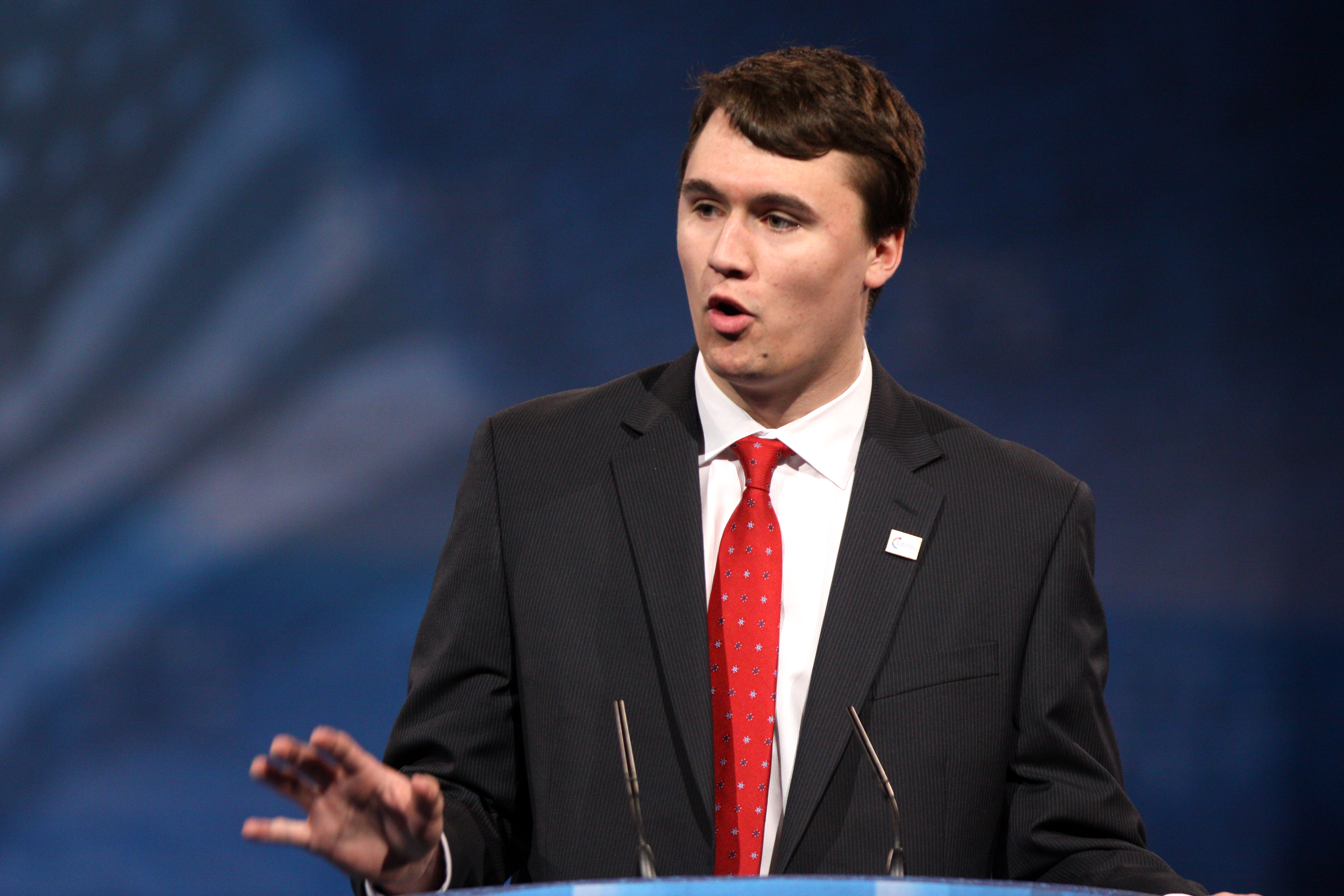
Kirk speaking at the 2013 Conservative Political Action Conference (CPAC) in National Harbor, Maryland

In May 2012, Kirk gave a speech at Benedictine University's "Youth Government Day", where he met Bill Montgomery, who was then a Tea Party-backed legislative candidate. Montgomery later said that the event's speakers had bored the audience of a few hundred high-school kids, but the students began paying rapt attention when Kirk started speaking. Montgomery encouraged Kirk to pursue political activism full time. A month after they first met, Montgomery and Kirk co-founded Turning Point USA, aiming to create an organization that would rival liberal groups such as MoveOn. Kirk described it as a student organization advocating for free markets and limited government. At the 2012 Republican National Convention, Kirk met Foster Friess, a former investment manager and prominent Republican donor, and persuaded him to finance the organization.

Kirk remained the executive director, chief fundraiser, and the public face of Turning Point USA until his death in 2025. He became known for visiting college campuses to host informal debates with ideological opponents, typically students, and attempting to persuade them to consider conservative candidates. He often sat behind a table bearing his slogan, "Prove me Wrong". According to the Associated Press, video clips of Kirk's campus appearances spread online, helping him "secure a steady stream of donations that transformed Turning Point into one of the country's largest political organizations". Turning Point eventually began holding massive rallies in which top conservative leaders addressed tens of thousands of young voters. In 2025, TPUSA said it had chapters at more than 2,000 college and high school campuses, and that it had received 32,000 inquiries about starting new chapters in the days after Kirk's death.

TPUSA's activities include publication of the Professor Watchlist and the School Board Watchlist. Critics of these watchlists say they threaten academic freedom and have led to the targeted harassment of academics. In 2019, the Professor Watchlist was briefly suspended by its web host. In 2020, ProPublica investigated TPUSA's finances and found that the organization made "misleading financial claims" and that its audits were not done by an independent auditor. ProPublica also reported that Kirk's salary from TPUSA had increased from $27,000 to nearly $300,000 and that he had bought an $855,000 condo in Longboat Key, Florida. In 2020, Turning Point USA had $39.2 million in revenue. Kirk earned a salary of more than $325,000 from TPUSA and related organizations.

==== Turning Point Academy ====
In 2021, TPUSA announced it would launch an online academy as an alternative to schools "poisoning our youth with anti-American ideas". Turning Point Academy was intended to cater to families seeking an "America-first education". Arizona education firm StrongMind initially partnered with TPUSA with plans to open the academy by the fall of 2022 and assessed its "potential to generate over $40 million in gross revenue at full capacity (10,000 students)". The partnership ended after StrongMind received backlash from its own employees, and key subcontractor Freedom Learning Group, which prepared course content for the academy, also backed out. In 2022, Turning Point partnered with Dream City Christian School, a private school that has campuses in Glendale and Scottsdale, Arizona, and is affiliated with Dream City Church. In the 2022–2023 school year, the school received $900,000 in Arizona school voucher funds.

=== Turning Point Action ===
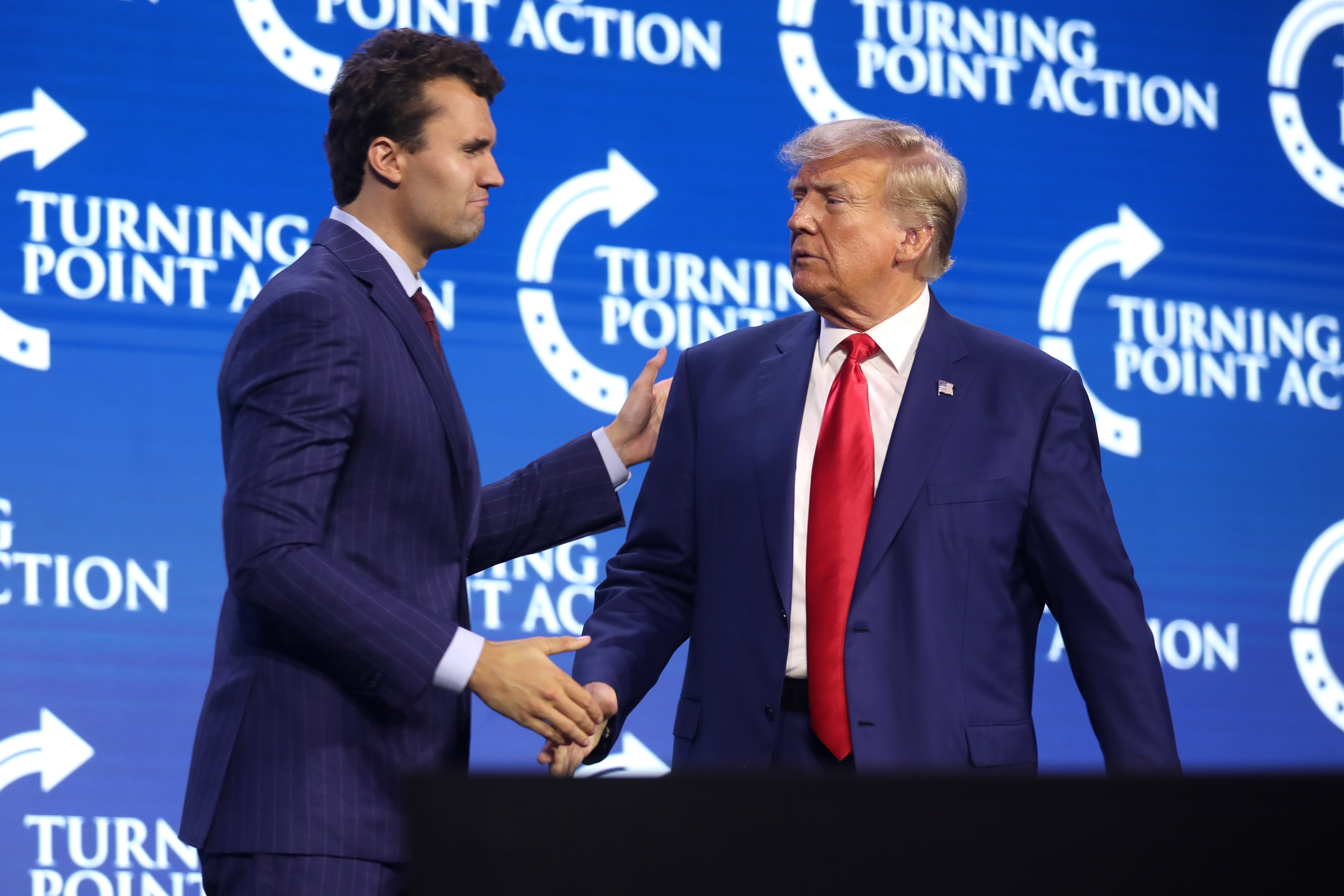
Kirk and then-former President Donald Trump speaking with attendees at a Turning Point Action Conference in 2023

In May 2019, it was reported that Kirk was preparing to launch Turning Point Action, a 501(c)(4) designed to elect more conservatives. In July 2019, Kirk announced that Turning Point Action had acquired Students for Trump along with "all associated media assets". He became chairman and launched a campaign to mobilize the youth vote for the 2020 Trump reelection campaign. The unsuccessful effort led TPUSA and the 2020 Trump campaign to blame each other for an overall decline in Trump's youth support. In December 2022, Kirk announced the Mount Vernon Project, an initiative by Turning Point Action to remove members from the Republican National Committee who were not "grassroot conservatives".

On January 5, 2021, the day before the Washington, D.C., protest that led to the January 6 U.S. Capitol attack, Kirk wrote on Twitter that Turning Point Action and Students for Trump were sending more than 80 "buses of patriots to D.C. to fight for this president". A spokesman for Turning Point said that the groups ended up sending seven buses with 350 students. In the lead-up to the storming, Kirk said he was "getting 500 emails a minute calling for a civil war". Publix heiress Julie Fancelli gave Kirk's organizations $1.25 million to fund the buses to the January 6 event. Kirk also paid $60,000 for Kimberly Guilfoyle to speak at the rally.

Afterward, Kirk "said the violent acts at the Capitol were not an insurrection and did not represent mainstream Trump supporters." Appearing before the U.S. House Select Committee on the January 6 Attack in December 2022, he pleaded the Fifth Amendment privilege against self-incrimination. His team provided the committee "with 8,000 pages of records in response to its requests". In another closed-door meeting of the House January 6 Committee, Ali Alexander blamed Kirk and TPUSA for financing the travel of demonstrators to the Save America rally. TPUSA spokesperson Andrew Kolvet denied that Kirk advocated for violence and gave a statement saying "Charlie wants to save America with words, persuasion, courage and common sense. The left is desperate to conjure up some Christian bogeyman that simply doesn't exist. We're telling churches: Either get involved and have a say in the direction of your country or you'll leave a void that someone else who doesn't share your values will fill."

=== Falkirk Center for Faith and Liberty ===
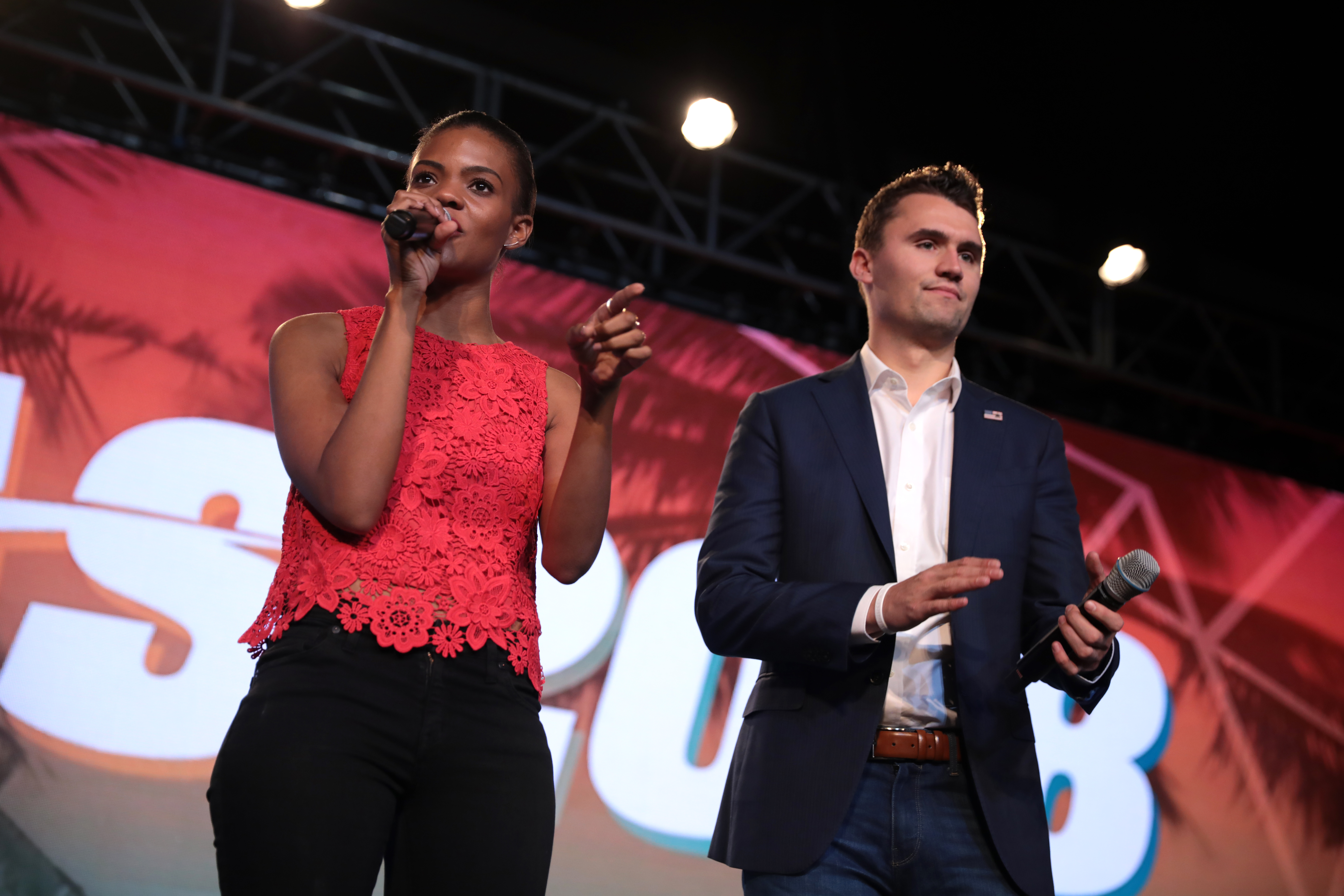
Kirk and Candace Owens speaking at the Student Action Summit hosted by Turning Point USA, West Palm Beach, Florida in December 2018

In November 2019, Kirk and Jerry Falwell Jr. co-founded the Falkirk Center for Faith and Liberty, a right-wing think tank funded, owned, and housed by Liberty University. ("Falkirk" was a portmanteau of "Falwell" and "Kirk".) Fellows included Antonia Okafor, director of outreach for Gun Owners of America; Sebastian Gorka, former deputy assistant to Trump; and Jenna Ellis, a senior legal counselor for Trump.

In 2020, the Falkirk Center spent at least $50,000 on Facebook advertisements promoting Trump and Republican candidates. Students and alumni raised objections to the organization's aggressive political tone, which they considered inconsistent with the university's mission. Falwell resigned as president of Liberty University in August 2020, and the university did not renew Kirk's one-year contract in late 2020. In 2021, the university renamed the organization to the Standing for Freedom Center.

=== Turning Point Faith ===
After Liberty University did not renew Kirk's contract with the Falkirk Center for Faith and Liberty in 2021, Kirk and Pentecostal pastor Rob McCoy founded Turning Point Faith, an organization that encouraged pastors and other church leaders to be active in local and national political issues. Its activities include faith-based voter drives and promotion of TPUSA's views, with the stated goal to help churches become more civically engaged so that American society can "return to foundational Christian values". According to TPUSA's 2021 Investor Prospectus, the program—with a budget of $6.4 million—will "address America's crumbling religious foundation by engaging thousands of pastors nationwide" in order to "breathe renewed civic engagement into our churches".

=== Other leadership roles ===
Kirk was the William F. Buckley Jr. council member of the Council for National Policy (CNP), a group "that has served for decades as a hub for a nationwide network of conservative activists and the donors who support them", according to the CNP's September 2020 membership directory leaked in February 2021. He was a spokesperson for CNP Action, the political arm of the CNP.

In March 2025, Donald Trump appointed Kirk to the U.S. Air Force Academy Board of Visitors.

== Activism and media ==
Kirk is credited with redefining conservatism on college campuses, turning it from just a set of beliefs into a developed, mainstream identity.

=== Republican and pro-Trump activism ===
Kirk with Donald Trump in 2024, at the time President-elect prior to his second term

In an interview with Wired during the 2016 Republican National Convention, Kirk said that while he "was not the world's biggest Donald Trump fan", he would vote for him, and that Trump's candidacy made Turning Point's mission more difficult. Kirk flipped to supporting Trump at the convention and spent the remainder of the campaign assisting with travel and media arrangements for Donald Trump Jr. In October 2016, Kirk participated in a Fox News event along with Trump Jr., Eric Trump, and Lara Trump that had a pro-Donald Trump tone.

Vice President JD Vance recalled that Kirk first reached out to him in 2017, before Vance entered politics, and that Kirk was one of the first people he called when he considered running for Senate. Kirk introduced him to his eventual campaign managers as well as to Donald Trump Jr. Other notable Republicans also credit Kirk with helping them establish careers in politics.

In July 2019, Kirk became chairman of Students for Trump, which had been acquired by Turning Point Action. The unsuccessful effort of his youth mobilization campaign led TPUSA and the Trump campaign to blame each other for an overall decline in Trump's youth support. In April 2020, Matthew Rosenberg and Katie Rogers wrote in The New York Times that Kirk exemplifies "walking the line between mainstream conservative opinion and outright disinformation" and that "with a powerful ally in the president's eldest son, Donald Trump Jr., Mr. Kirk both amplifies the president's message and helps shape it."

On March 3, 2020, Kirk released his book The MAGA Doctrine, a manifesto for the Make America Great Again movement, in which he wrote that the Republican Party is "in some sense no longer a conservative party, no longer the party of Reagan, but instead a Trump-remade populist party". In December 2022, Kirk urged the Republican National Committee to listen to their grassroots voters, saying, "If ignored, we will have the most stunted and muted Republican Party in the history of the conservative movement, the likes of which we haven't seen in generations." In 2023, Kirk called for the imprisonment or the death penalty of Joe Biden for "crimes against America". Kirk was an early investor in 1789 Capital, which invests in MAGA businesses.

Kirk with future Vice President JD Vance in 2024

Political analysts, and Trump himself, credit Kirk's engagement of young voters with playing a key role in the 2024 U.S. presidential election. Before the election, Kirk visited approximately 25 college campuses, marketed as the "You're Being Brainwashed" tour, aiming to stir up more Gen Z voter turnout as he engaged and debated students on many topics. According to Turning Point Action, the tour produced around two billion views on social media. Kirk aided Trump in choosing leadership positions for his administration, including cabinet positions.

During 2025, Kirk endorsed a number of Republican candidates, including Andy Biggs in the Arizona governor contest and Nate Morris in the Kentucky U.S. Senate primary. In July 2025, Kirk conducted interviews about Jeffrey Epstein on his podcast and pressured Trump's administration to release more information. By then, Kirk was one of the most prominent figures in the MAGA movement and often called the face of the movement. Kirk had insisted that he had no interest in elective office, though stopped saying so in 2025; The New York Times reported that "at Turning Point USA, it was widely assumed that the boss would one day be president".

=== Talk shows ===
From October 2020 until his assassination, Kirk hosted The Charlie Kirk Show, a daily three-hour radio talk show, on Salem Media Group's "The Answer" radio channel. It was among the most popular podcasts on Apple Podcasts. According to internal data from TPUSA, Kirk's podcast was downloaded between 500,000 and 750,000 times each day in 2024. Kirk's "Turning Point Live" was a three-hour streaming talk show aimed at Generation Z. TPUSA's monthly online average grew to 111,000 unique visitors in 2021. A February 2023 Brookings Institution study found Kirk's podcast contained the second-highest proportion of false, misleading, and unsubstantiated statements among 36,603 episodes produced by 79 prominent political podcasters.

In a 2022 episode of his podcast, Kirk called for a "patriot" to bail out of jail the man who broke into Nancy Pelosi's house and attacked and tried to murder her husband with a hammer. Also in 2022, journalist Bari Weiss released a report of internal Twitter documents dubbed "The Twitter Files", which alleged that Twitter was censoring conservative personalities on the social media platform. Weiss posted screenshots of Twitter tools that moderators could use to limit the reach of posts and accounts. According to Rolling Stone magazine, Kirk's Twitter account was flagged under "do not amplify", which meant algorithms would not highlight tweets coming from it.

In April 2024, Kirk created a TikTok account after previously expressing skepticism of the social media platform. His account gained popularity after he posted numerous videos of himself talking to college students on his campus tours, with some videos garnering as many as 50 million views. In February 2025, Kirk signed with the Trinity Broadcasting Network to host a weekday talk show, Charlie Kirk Today.

=== College campus debates ===
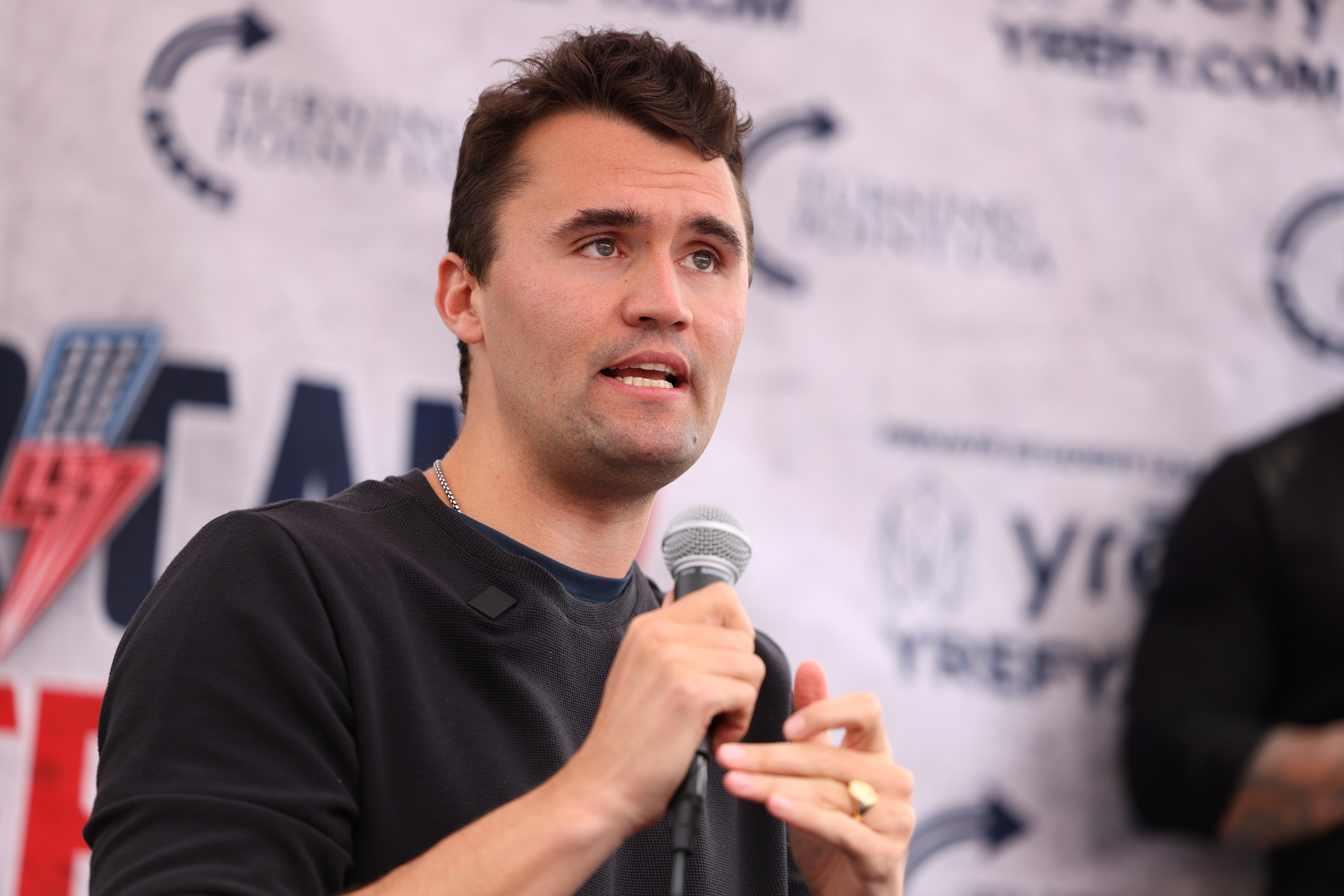
Kirk debating with students at the University of Tennessee in March 2025

At TPUSA's college events, Kirk often propounded right-wing populist and nationalist views and invited students to "prove [him] wrong" in front of an audience of vocal supporters. The New York Times reviewed more than four dozen debates at Kirk's twice-yearly university tours, and discussed them with four debate coaches and university professors. The analysis showed Kirk using the debate format to create viral confrontations and "deliver a consistent hard-line message while orchestrating highly shareable moments". The Times described him as having the advantage of having refined his debate performance against hundreds of people and used arguments likely to result in agitated and defensive responses by his less-experienced opponents.

== Political views ==
Kirk's views have been described as far-right by a variety of outlets and academics, and others state that these views are now in the mainstream of American conservatism. Groups that study hate speech, including the Southern Poverty Law Center, described his rhetoric as racist, xenophobic, and extreme. Kirk disagreed with critics who said he created a toxic online environment, arguing: "Disagreement is a healthy part of our systems."

=== Freedom of speech and expression ===
While Kirk backed Republican crackdowns on the 2024 pro-Palestinian protests on university campuses and activist deportations in the second Trump presidency, he opposed crackdowns on pro-Palestinian speech if they were targeted at American citizens. He said: "We've allowed far too many people who hate America move here from abroad, but the right to speak freely is the birthright of all Americans." In April 2025, he expressed concerns that the Trump administration's crackdowns on campuses threatened free speech and were a weaponization of antisemitism, saying: "Once 'antisemitism' becomes valid grounds to censor or even imprison somebody, there will be frantic efforts to label all kinds of speech as antisemitic — the same way the left labeled all kinds of statements as 'racist' to justify silencing their opposition."

In August 2025, he discussed the burning of pride flags, stating: "We should work to overturn every conviction for those arrested, fined, or otherwise harassed for the 'hate crime' of doing donuts over Pride flags painted on public streets. It should be legal to burn a rainbow or [Black Lives Matter] flag in public."

=== False claims and conspiracy theories ===
According to Forbes, Kirk was known for "his repudiation of liberal college education and embrace of pro-Trump conspiracy theories". He promoted the Cultural Marxism conspiracy theory, and called universities "islands of totalitarianism". In a 2015 speech at the Liberty Forum of Silicon Valley, Kirk said he had applied for nomination to the U.S. Military Academy in West Point, New York, and was not accepted. He said that "the slot he considered his went to 'a far less-qualified candidate of a different gender and a different persuasion'" whose test scores he claimed he knew. In 2017 he told The New Yorker that he was being sarcastic when he said it. In 2018 he told the Chicago Tribune that "he was just repeating something he'd been told", and in October 2019 at a New Hampshire Turning Point event featuring Rand Paul he claimed he never said it.

Following the murder of George Floyd and subsequent protests, Kirk referred to him as a "scumbag", citing his criminal history, and referred to the city of Minneapolis (where he was killed) as "not the town it used to be". Kirk promoted debunked claims about George Floyd, such as that he was "illegally counterfeiting currency" and had once "put a gun to a pregnant woman's stomach". On Facebook, YouTube, and Rumble, Kirk repeatedly promoted the false claim that the medical examiner who performed the autopsy declared Floyd had died of an overdose. After a fact check by Agence France-Presse that noted the doctor stood by the classification of Floyd's death as a homicide, corrections were added to Kirk's posts on social media.

In July 2018, Kirk falsely claimed on social media that U.S. Justice Department statistics showed an increase in human trafficking arrests from 1,952 in 2016 to 6,087 in the first half of 2018. He deleted the tweet without explanation the next day, after a fact-checker had pointed out that the false 2018 number had originated on the conspiracy site 8chan. In December 2018, Kirk falsely claimed that protesters in the French yellow vests movement chanted "We want Trump". Trump later repeated these false claims.

Ahead of the 2020 U.S. presidential election, Kirk spread falsehoods about voter fraud and, immediately after Trump lost the 2020 election, Kirk promoted false and disproven claims of fraud in the election. On November 5, 2020, he led a Stop the Steal protest at the Maricopa Tabulation Center in Phoenix. Kirk was considered a "big name" social influencer in Rudy Giuliani's communications plan to overturn the 2020 election. In August 2025, Kirk called for the elimination of Jasmine Crockett's congressional district as a part of the 2025 Texas redistricting, justifying the erasure of her district by claiming she was a part of an "attempt to eliminate the white population in this country".

Shortly before his death, Kirk suggested that Jeffrey Epstein had been a Mossad agent, with claims of him being "a creation of either Mossad, Israeli intelligence, American intelligence, Saudi intelligence, or maybe he was just a hired gun...". In response, many Israeli government officials, including former Prime Minister Naftali Bennett, denied Epstein's involvement with them.

==== COVID-19 ====
In 2020, Kirk spread false information and conspiracy theories about COVID-19 on social media. He sharply criticized Democrats' criticism of Trump's withdrawal of WHO funding and called COVID-19 the "China virus", which Trump retweeted. Kirk alleged that the WHO covered up information about the COVID-19 pandemic. He was briefly banned from Twitter after falsely claiming that hydroxychloroquine had proved to be "100% effective in treating the virus." He alleged that Gretchen Whitmer, the Democratic governor of Michigan, threatened doctors who tried to use the medication. Rudy Giuliani retweeted these falsehoods, and Twitter also suspended his account.

In defending the Trump administration's response to the COVID-19 pandemic, Kirk falsely stated that during the 2009 swine flu pandemic it "took President Barack Obama 'millions infected and over 1,000 deaths'" to declare a public health emergency. (Note: When the Obama administration acknowledged the WHO's declaration of a public health emergency on April 26, 2009, there were fewer than 280 cases of H1N1 infection reported in the U.S., and the first confirmed death (of a Mexican toddler on vacation) occurred the next day, April 27. The WHO projected 1,000,000+ U.S. cases on June 25, after declaring a pandemic on June 11.) A spokesman for Turning Point USA acknowledged that its "social media team confused the two different types of emergency declarations", and that Trump had not yet issued a national emergency.

Kirk described the public health measure of social distancing prohibitions in churches as a Democratic plot against Christianity and made the unfounded assertion that authorities in Wuhan, China, were burning patients. In 2020, he said he refused to abide by mask requirements because "the science around masks is very questionable".

In July 2021, Kirk promoted misleading claims about the efficacy and safety of COVID-19 vaccines. On the Fox News show hosted by Tucker Carlson, Kirk called mandatory requirements for students to take the COVID-19 vaccine "medical apartheid". He called for parents to protest at school board meetings, urging them to push back against mask-wearing.

=== Social policy ===
==== Christian nationalism ====
Kirk was initially critical of the evangelical right, but he later reversed his position. In 2018, he told Dave Rubin, "We do have a separation of church and state, and we should support that." In 2019, Kirk met Rob McCoy, a pastor of a megachurch in Ventura County, California, who convinced him that America's founding documents were derived from the Bible. In 2021, Kirk told a congregation, "The Bible says very clearly to 'Occupy until I come'", a verse often cited by followers of the Seven Mountain Mandate to assert that before Jesus returns, evangelical Christians must dominate seven areas of society: government, media, education, business, family, religion, and entertainment. Kirk later interviewed with the creator of the Seven Mountain concept. Kirk frequently collaborated with Christian nationalist pastors and preachers, having them as guests on his shows as well as appearing as a speaker at their events, with the Anti-Defamation League accusing Kirk of promoting Christian nationalism.

In 2022, Kirk called the separation of church and state in the United States a "fabrication". In 2024, he said, "One of the reasons we're living through a constitutional crisis is that we no longer have a Christian nation, but we have a Christian form of government, and they're incompatible. You cannot have liberty if you do not have a Christian population." Appearing at a Trump campaign rally in the same year, he said: "This is a Christian state. I'd like to see it stay that way." By 2024, Kirk's shift to Christian nationalism exemplified its growing approval by the Republican Party under Trump.

In a 2023 speech, he said that "all men are created equal in the eyes of God, all men and women, but not all cultures are created equal. To say that, you get attacked in every direction, but excuse me when I say that Western civilization is the best that humanity has produced. It's an outgrowth of the Bible."

==== Abortion ====
Kirk strongly opposed abortion, arguing that it is murder and should be illegal. He opposed exceptions for rape, including for children as young as 10. Kirk compared abortion to the Holocaust, and said that abortion is worse.

==== Gun rights and the Second Amendment ====
Kirk was a gun rights advocate and was opposed to gun control. After the Parkland school shooting in February 2018, he spoke for the National Rifle Association in Parkland, Florida. In an April 2023 TPUSA event in Salt Lake City, Utah, Kirk said: "I think it's worth it, I think it's worth to have a cost of, unfortunately, some gun deaths every single year so that we can have the Second Amendment to protect our other God-given rights."

==== LGBTQ community ====
Kirk routinely made anti-LGBTQ remarks, opposing transgender rights and medical care, and asserted that there is an "LGBTQ agenda". Kirk claimed that being gay was an "error" and likened homosexuality to drug addiction. He also believed monogamous heterosexual marriage should be a prerequisite for adoption.

==== Same-sex marriage ====
On November 22, 2019, Kirk said, "I believe marriage is one man, one woman", but added that gay people should be allowed in the conservative movement. In 2022, during an episode of The Charlie Kirk Show streamed on YouTube, Kirk criticized the Supreme Court's decision in Obergefell v. Hodges. He called LGBTQ activists the "alphabet mafia", claiming that the movement is not "just about two dudes being able to get married". Kirk called Obergefell a "national takeover of our laws" and argued that conservatives mistakenly thought the issue of same-sex marriage in the United States would end after the ruling, instead concluding that "...[gay people] are not happy just having marriage. Instead, they now want to corrupt your children".

==== Transgender community ====
In the op-ed "Sexual Anarchy" for The American Mind on October 14, 2021, Kirk said "the facts are that there are only two genders; that transgenderism and gender 'fluidity' are lies that hurt people and abuse kids." In early 2023, he said that transgender women in women's locker rooms should be "taken care of the way we used to take care of things in the 1950s and '60s".

In another 2023 speech, Kirk said, "One issue I think that is so against our senses, so against the natural law and, dare I say, a throbbing middle finger to God, is the transgender thing happening in America right now." In April 2024, Kirk called for Trump to propose a nationwide ban of gender-affirming care for transgender people. That same day, he called for the imprisonment of doctors who perform gender-affirming care and demanded "Nuremberg-style" trials for them. Kirk also actively promoted misinformation about mass shootings by transgender people. Statistical evidence shows that such shootings by transgender people are rare.

==== Gender roles ====
Kirk promoted traditional gender roles, telling young women to go to college for the purpose of finding husbands and "embrace their roles as mothers and homemakers". In October 2021, he said on his podcast that Democrats wanted Americans to "live in sexual anarchy". According to Media Matters for America, Kirk said at the TPUSA Young Women's Leadership Summit 2022 Conference that the "biblical model" for women to pursue in romantic relationships is a partner who is "a protector and a leader, and deep down, a vast majority of you agree" and that "if you want to go meet conservative men that have their act together, that aren't like, woke beta men, like, start a Turning Point USA chapter, you'll meet a lot of them." Kirk had repeatedly criticized birth control, and once said that it creates "very angry and bitter young ladies and young women".

=== Race ===
==== White Americans ====
Kirk had voiced a belief in the decline and victimhood of White Americans, reflecting grievance politics. In 2018, Kirk told a college audience that the concept of white privilege is a myth and a "racist idea". In 2021, he presented a more hard-right stance, saying on his show that Democratic immigration policies were aimed at "diminishing and decreasing white demographics in America" and called for Texas to "deputize a citizen force and put them on the border".

In 2023, Kirk said that "prowling Blacks go around for fun to go target white people" in urban America. In 2024, he said, "The great replacement strategy, which is well under way every single day in our southern border, is a strategy to replace white rural America with something different", and added, "The American Democrat party hates this country. They wanna see it collapse. They love it when America becomes less white." Kirk further posted "The 'Great Replacement' is not a theory, it's a reality", alongside a Fox News headline that falsely claimed: "7.2M illegals entered the U.S. under Biden administration, an amount greater than population of 36 states."

==== African Americans ====
In 2018, Kirk and TPUSA's communication director Candace Owens presented what the Southern Poverty Law Center described as "a symphony of racist dog-whistles ... pandering to the extreme right" at the 2018 Western Conservative Summit, with Kirk asserting that the increasing presence of African Americans in American politics resulted in the Black community being "worse off". Kirk cited single motherhood in Chicago's Black community as a cause of gun violence, blaming the absence of a father from some Black households on "a broken culture problem".

Kirk praised Martin Luther King Jr. prior to December 2023, variously calling him a "hero" and a "civil rights icon". That December, he used a speech at AmericaFest to describe him as "awful ... not a good person" and as someone who is admired only because he said "one thing he didn't actually believe". The speech also saw Kirk condemn the Civil Rights Act of 1964, calling its passage a "huge mistake" and alleging that it had created a "permanent DEI-type bureaucracy". Kirk thought the Civil Rights Act of 1964 was a destructive force in American politics that had been turned into an "anti-white weapon". Kirk told The New York Times, "I take the Caldwellian view, from his book The Age of Entitlement, that we went through a new founding in the '60s and that the Civil Rights Act has actually superseded the U.S. Constitution as its reference point. In fact, I bet if you polled Americans, most of them would have more reverence for the Civil Rights Act than the Constitution. I could be wrong, but I think I'm right."

Kirk was a critic of schools and local governments teaching about racism. He wrote in a 2021 Fox News article that "directly confronting the left, and promising to fight their illiberal ideology with state power when necessary, is the key to winning everyday Americans". He served on Trump's 1776 Commission to advance "patriotic education", which was set up in response to the 1619 Project. In October 2021, Kirk began the "Exposing Critical Racism Tour" of a number of campuses and off-campus venues to "fight racist theories on America's college campuses!" He also opposed Juneteenth (a day which commemorates the end of slavery in the U.S.) being declared a federal holiday, describing it as "anti-American" for promoting "a neo-segregationist view" that he alleged sought to supplant Independence Day.

On July 11, 2023, after the Supreme Court of the United States ruled that colleges can no longer employ affirmative-action practices in admissions, Representative Sheila Jackson Lee stated on the House floor, "I rise today as a clear recipient of affirmative action, particularly in higher education. I may have been admitted on affirmative action, both in terms of being a woman and a woman of color, but I can declare that I did not graduate on affirmative action." Kirk reacted to this on his podcast on July 13, 2023, by stating, "If we would have said three weeks ago [...] that Joy Reid and Michelle Obama and Sheila Jackson Lee and Ketanji Brown Jackson were affirmative-action picks, we would have been called racist. But now they're comin' out and they're saying it for us!" He continued, "You do not have the brain processing power to otherwise be taken really seriously. You had to go steal a white person's slot to go be taken somewhat seriously."

In January 2024, Kirk said that a "myth" had been created around King which had "grown totally out of control" and that King was currently "the most honored, worshiped, even deified person of the 20th century" despite "most people" supposedly disliking him during his life. Responding to accusations by Malcolm Kenyatta that he was working to undermine King and the Voting Rights Act of 1965, Kirk called this claim "a lie" and "fear-mongering", and added that telling the "truth" about King "should not be trampling sacred ground" since he was "just a man ... a very flawed one at that" and a "mythological anti-racist creation of the 1960s". Kirk later said he had "found the sacred cow of modern America" in criticizing King. Also in January 2024, Kirk blamed DEI programs for national aviation issues, saying, "If I see a Black pilot, I'm going to be like, 'Boy, I hope he's qualified.'"

Kirk called Kentanji Brown Jackson a "recipient of affirmative action" on his podcast and said she was nominated for the Supreme Court because of her race, following up with “Biden explicitly said he would only pick a Black woman for the US Supreme Court. Biden himself was an administer of affirmative action." Kirk blamed the high death toll of the July 2025 Central Texas floods on DEI. On September 9, 2025, while speaking about the killing of Iryna Zarutska, Kirk accused Democrats of spreading a "false narrative" that "that there is a relentless assault against Black people on behalf of white people", tweeting "White individuals are actually more likely to be attacked, especially even per capita, by Black individuals in this country." Kirk cited a Fox News video clip in the tweet that reported data from the 2023 Bureau of Justice statistics.

=== Jewish people ===
In October 2023, Kirk said on The Charlie Kirk Show that "Jewish donors have been the number 1 funding mechanism of radical, open border, neoliberal, quasi‑Marxist policies ... This is a beast created by secular Jews, and now it's coming for Jews", and also suggested that these Jews control "not just the colleges; it's the nonprofits, it's the movies, it's Hollywood, it's all of it". Soon after, he said that "Jews have been some of the largest funders of cultural Marxist ideas and supporters of those ideas over the last 30 or 40 years." Kirk called on American Jews to stop "subsidizing your own demise by supporting institutions that breed Anti-Semites and endorse genocidal killers".

After Elon Musk endorsed a post which said that "Jewish communities have been pushing the exact kind of hatred against whites that they claim to want people to stop using against them," Kirk defended Musk from charges of antisemitism by claiming the post's charge against Jewish communities was accurate. He went on to claim "the philosophical foundation of anti-whiteness has been largely financed by Jewish donors", but said he was glad that some donors were reconsidering.

In July 2025, Kirk warned his followers against hatred of Jews, calling it "evil" and "demonic". He was quoted as saying that "no non-Jewish person my age has a longer or clearer record of support for Israel, sympathy with the Jewish people, or opposition to antisemitism than I do". However, Kirk was also accused of antisemitism by multiple people and organizations; with the Anti-Defamation League accusing Kirk of creating a "vast platform for extremists and far-right conspiracy theorists", a critique of which Kirk rejected.

Days prior to Kirk's assassination, Kirk texted associates on WhatsApp that "Jewish donors play into all the stereotypes" and he felt pushed "[to] leave the pro-Israel cause" as donors tried to "bully" him by withholding funding for associating with Candace Owens and Tucker Carlson, two prominent critics of Israel. That month, businessman Robert Shillman cancelled a $2 million donation to TPUSA over Carlson's participation at a TPUSA event. Andrew Kolvet, a spokesperson for TPUSA, reacted to these messages by saying that Kirk's views on Israel were "...complicated and nuanced, and it was a wrestle that was going on for months" and also stated that he believed Kirk was not "turning" on Israel.

Some Jewish public figures have defended Kirk against accusations of antisemitism, citing his pro-Israel stance. Some donors to TPUSA are Jewish, including Bernard Marcus. Dennis Prager, the Jewish co-founder of PragerU, was quoted, "To call Charlie Kirk an antisemite — and further, to say he's long been accused of being such — is to so cheapen the word as to render it meaningless."

=== Islam ===
In 2018, Kirk was a speaker for the annual conference held by the anti-Muslim advocacy group ACT for America in Washington DC.

In 2025, Kirk wrote on Twitter that "Islam is the sword the left is using to slit the throat of America." Following the victory of Zohran Mamdani in the 2025 New York City Democratic mayoral primary, Kirk posted that "24 years ago a group of Muslims killed 2,753 people on 9/11. Now a Muslim Socialist is on pace to run New York City." In a separate post, Kirk argued that "It's not Islamophobia to notice that Muslims want to import values into the West that seek to destabilize our civilization." On his podcast, Kirk said that Islam was "not compatible with Western civilization".

=== Immigration and deportation ===
Kirk's speech at the United States Capitol following the second inauguration of Donald Trump on January 20, 2025

At a 2023 event at Missouri State University, Kirk said that immigration to the United States should be completely stopped. In the lead-up to the 2024 presidential election, Kirk promoted the false claim that Haitians in Springfield, Ohio, were eating residents' pets and other wildlife. Kirk called for the use of force against migrants at the U.S.–Mexico border, including the use of tear gas, rubber bullets, and whips. Kirk said that migrants were "bringing force upon themselves" by "invading" the country. In justifying this use of force, Kirk promoted false claims of disproportionate criminality among migrants, saying: "Those are the men that will go into your communities and break into your homes and rape your women, take your children. But, hey, they're – they're dreamers."

In 2023, Kirk called for Mehdi Hasan to be deported and deplatformed over his views on the COVID-19 pandemic, calling him a "neurotic lunatic" and saying, "Send him back to the country he came from. Holy cow! Get him off TV. Revoke his visa." In October 2023, Kirk also called U.S. representative Ilhan Omar a "terrorist sympathizer" and called for her deportation.

==== Indian immigration visas ====
Kirk was vocal about his disapproval of immigration of Indians, particularly non-Christian Indians, into the US. Kirk stated that "America does not need more visas for people from India", arguing that Indian immigrants take job opportunities from Americans. Separately, Kirk stated that America would still be America if 90% of the population were of Indian national origin, as long as they were Christian Indians.

=== Opioid epidemic ===
Kirk blamed the Chinese government and drug cartels for the opioid crisis in the United States, telling the audience that "almost nobody in this audience has a friend that you've lost to the Russian government but you do have a friend or a family member that has died because of the cartels and the Chinese Communist Party with a fentanyl [sic] coming into our communities".

=== Foreign affairs ===
==== Israel ====
Kirk was highly supportive of Israel. During a 2019 visit to Jerusalem, he told an audience "I'm very pro-Israel ... and my whole life I have defended Israel". In August 2025, he said "I have a bulletproof resumé showing my defense of Israel ... I believe in the scriptural land rights given to Israel. I believe in fulfilment of prophecy", and added that he would "fight for" Israel.

In September 2025, conservative political commentator Tucker Carlson claimed that Kirk loved Israel, but disliked Israeli Prime Minister Benjamin Netanyahu and was "appalled by what was happening in Gaza." Carlson also claimed that Kirk believed Netanyahu was using the United States to wage wars on behalf of Israel. (Note: Shortly after the October 7th attacks, where security forces were widely criticized by the Israeli public for a delayed response, Kirk had floated a conspiracy theory that Netanyahu issued a "stand down" order as a means to bolster his own political standing.)

In December 2025, The Jerusalem Post reported that Kirk had sent a letter to Israeli Prime Minister Benjamin Netanyahu warning that the country was "losing the information war" among young Americans. According to the report, he argued that reliance on American pro-Israel advocates was insufficient and that pro-Palestinian narratives were being spread. Kirk urged Israel to develop a direct, independent voice to communicate its perspective. Elements of his recommendations were subsequently considered in Israel's adoption of new messaging reforms, including multilingual digital content and the use of personal testimonies to reach international audiences.

Several Israeli government ministers, politicians, and political activists mourned Kirk's death, with many describing him as a "friend of Israel" and a few linking his killing to anti-Zionists. Israel's Foreign Minister Gideon Sa'ar described Kirk as a representative of "the Judeo-Christian values that unite Israel and America" and as a "fearless warrior for truth and freedom". Netanyahu said he had invited Kirk to Israel prior to Kirk's death, while Morton Klein said Kirk had recently accepted an invitation to speak at the Zionist Organization of America's national gala.

==== Gaza War and Twelve-Day War ====
Kirk often repeated pro-Israeli talking points about the ongoing Gaza War. He blamed Hamas for the deaths of civilians in Gaza, and denied that Israel is starving Palestinians. Kirk said of Palestine, "I don't think the place exists."

Shortly after the October 7 attacks on Israel in 2023, Kirk promoted a conspiracy theory alleging the Israeli government knew that Hamas was going to launch the attack, and that Benjamin Netanyahu allowed it to go ahead as part of a plan to remain in power. In May 2025, Kirk opposed a bipartisan bill to expand anti-BDS laws, which punish the boycott of Israel. He said the bill would "only create more antisemitism, and play into growing narratives that Israel is running the U.S. government".

Kirk opposed U.S. involvement in the Twelve-Day War, warning that a prolonged war would destabilize the region and could trigger a refugee crisis and civil war in Iran, though he maintained "full and complete trust" in Trump.

==== Russian invasion of Ukraine ====
Kirk often advanced pro-Russian talking points about the Russo-Ukrainian War. In the days before the Russian invasion of Ukraine, Kirk characterized the tensions as a "border dispute" and repeated false claims from Russian state media that Ukrainian forces had been shelling a Russian separatist enclave. Kirk's spokesman said at the time that while Kirk disagreed with the Russian invasion, he was "rightly questioning" U.S. foreign policy.

Kirk opposed the U.S. sending arms to Ukraine or providing financial support to the country. In August 2025, Kirk disagreed with Trump's decision to send more military aid to Ukraine, saying: "We were against it with Biden. Why would we be for it now? Unless it gets us to a peace settlement". He called Ukrainian president Volodymyr Zelenskyy a "CIA puppet" and "gangster" who "sent his own people to a senseless massacre", claiming that Zelenskyy had no interest in ending the war. Kirk said that Ukraine should cut spending on what he called a war it could not "win". He also claimed that Crimea could not be returned to Ukraine because "it has always been part of Russia".

In November 2024, Kirk offered an "apology" to the Russian people, stating "very few Americans want war with you" and that "the people obsessed with fighting you forever" were a minority "on their way out of power". His post was shared by the Russian state-owned news agency RT. Kirk believed that the U.S. was "wrong" to view Russia as an enemy, although he said he did not like "the Russian Federation or Russian dictator Vladimir Putin". At the February 2022 Conservative Political Action Conference, Kirk said that "the southern border matters a lot more than the Ukrainian border" and "I want every Republican leader ... to call what's happening on the southern border an invasion because two million people waltzed into our country last year."

==== Greenland ====
In January 2025, Kirk and Donald Trump, Jr. visited Greenland and hosted a lunch for locals in an effort to build support for a US annexation of Greenland. Local journalists later discovered that the group included homeless people recruited with the promise of a free meal. After his return to the US, Kirk said on his podcast that the young people of Greenland considered annexation to be a matter of dignity and that they wanted "to be part of a country that respects them, that gives them human rights". Following Greenland's parliamentary elections in March, in which voters repudiated the idea of annexation, he said that the "election shows that the pro-American forces are ascendant in Greenland, and it should be partnered with America, not the Old World."

==== China and Taiwan ====
Kirk told his listeners in 2025, "I would say, sadly, if we took Taiwan, it would probably start a nuclear war. Our leaders have largely mishandled China. We probably should have taken [Taiwan] in 1950 right after World War II."

==== South Korea and Japan ====
The week before he was killed, Kirk made stops at Seoul and Tokyo to spread his conservative message across Asia. In Seoul, he spoke to an event hosted by Mina Kim's Build Up Korea, where he spoke against immigration and communism, and cheered the prevalence of Christianity in South Korea. In Tokyo, he spoke at an event hosted by Sanseitō, a right-wing populist political party in Japan whose leader Sohei Kamiya described the party's ideology as equivalent to Trumpism. Kirk spoke out against migrant workers in Japan and said that he was "thrilled" to see a "growing political movement" against globalism.

=== Climate change ===
Kirk opposed the 2016 Paris Agreement on climate change. Kirk promoted climate change denial, calling global warming a hoax. In 2017, Kirk admitted that TPUSA had accepted funding from the fossil fuel industry. He spoke out against targeting fossil fuels and opposed student campaigns that pressured universities to divest from fossil fuels. In 2021, a Turning Point USA video featuring Kirk and Candace Owens claimed there is "no factual data to back up global warming" and that scientists do not know the cause; Science Feedback rated the claims inaccurate. Kirk later issued a correction, and the video was removed. In 2022, Kirk warned that climate activism would erode American sovereignty and private property, describing it as a Trojan Horse for Marxism and likening it to "pseudo-paganism". He called the statement that climate change is an existential threat "complete gibberish nonsense", stating that if your biggest worry in life is existential, you have a great life, and added that he did not believe human activity is the driver of climate change.

== Personal life ==
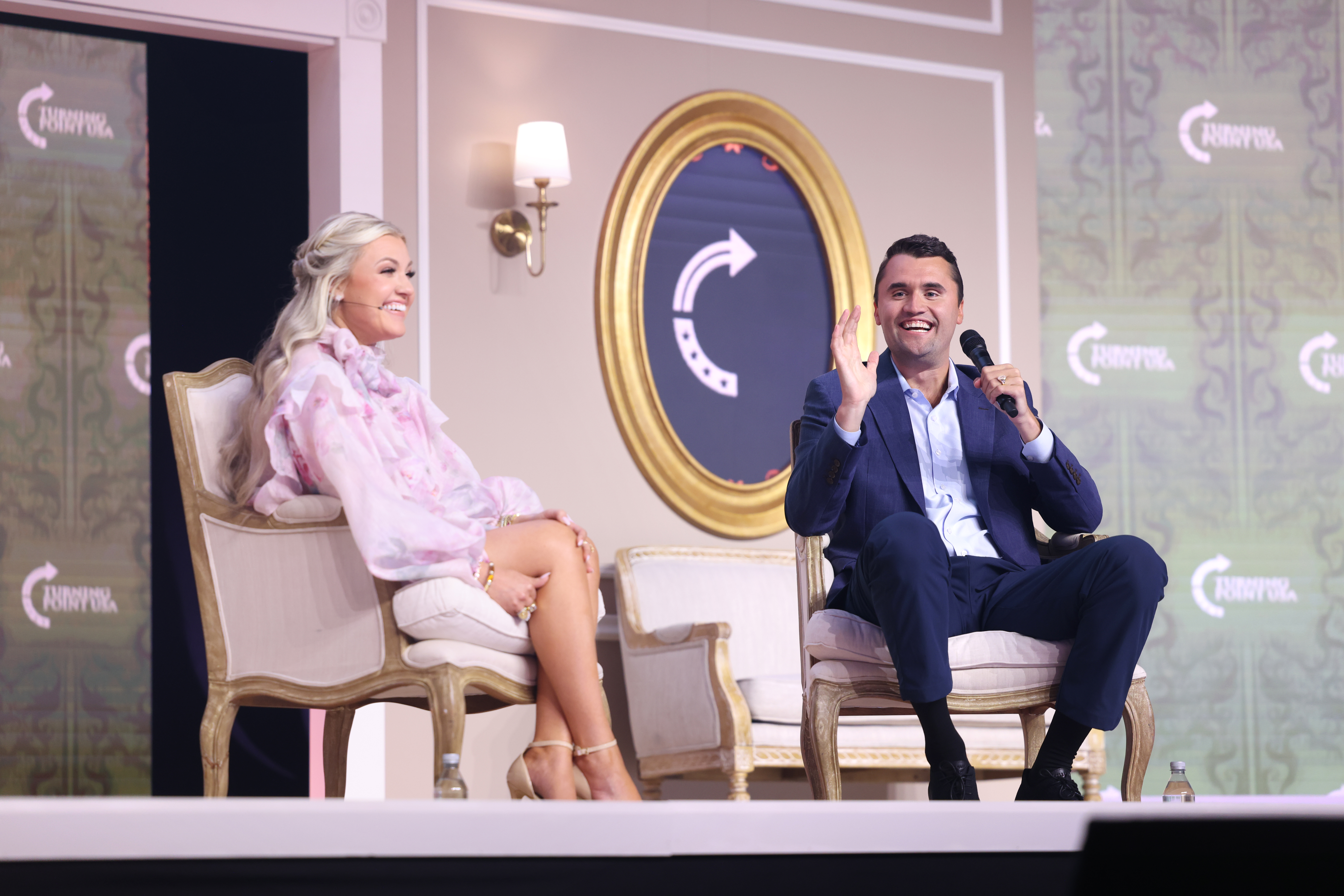
Kirk and his wife, Erika, speaking together at an event in Texas in June 2025

In May 2021, Kirk married Erika Kirk (née Frantzve), a businesswoman and podcaster who won the Miss Arizona USA pageant competition in 2012. The couple have a daughter, born in August 2022, and a son, born in May 2024.

Kirk's real estate portfolio consisted of three properties, including a $4.75 million estate in Scottsdale, Arizona, and a beachside condominium on the Florida Gulf Coast purchased for $855,000.

=== Religious views ===
Kirk was an evangelical Christian, belonging to the Calvary Chapel Association. Prior to the early 2020s, Kirk was described as secular and a critic of religious influence on politics and the state. He later became a Christian nationalist. In 2021, Kirk partnered with California pastor Rob McCoy to launch TPUSA Faith to mobilize conservative Christians to vote Republican. Kirk's shift was influenced by events such as Trump's move of the American embassy in Israel to Jerusalem and COVID-era church closures, which he and his allies portrayed as religious persecution. In January 2025 he said that he had been keeping a "Jewish sabbath" since 2021, turning off his phone from Friday night to Saturday night, considering it to be a Christian commandment.

Kirk advocated Christian creationism, arguing that evolution is false and that Charles Darwin has been debunked. He has discussed with Randy Guliuzza, the president of the Institute for Creation Research, ICR's support for young Earth creationism on his podcast. Kirk's YouTube page includes footage of informal debate on this topic at his signature "Prove Me Wrong" table on campus. Speaking on a podcast episode with creationist Stephen Meyer, Kirk said he was intrigued by Meyer's argument that there was scientific confirmation for intelligent design, contrary to Darwin.

Kirk elaborated on Hinduism and his disapproval of its morality due to its polytheism, stating: "When you have multiple gods, you get different moralities. And the West has largely embraced the idea that there is a standard of conduct, or a best way to live." Furthermore, in reply to an inquiry about how that claim was not inclusive of other religious worldviews, he responded: "I don't seek to be inclusive, I seek what is best. And the Ten Commandments are what is best. Would it be offensive to a young Hindu kid? Maybe, maybe not. But it also is a reminder they're living in a country that's a monotheistic country."

== Assassination ==
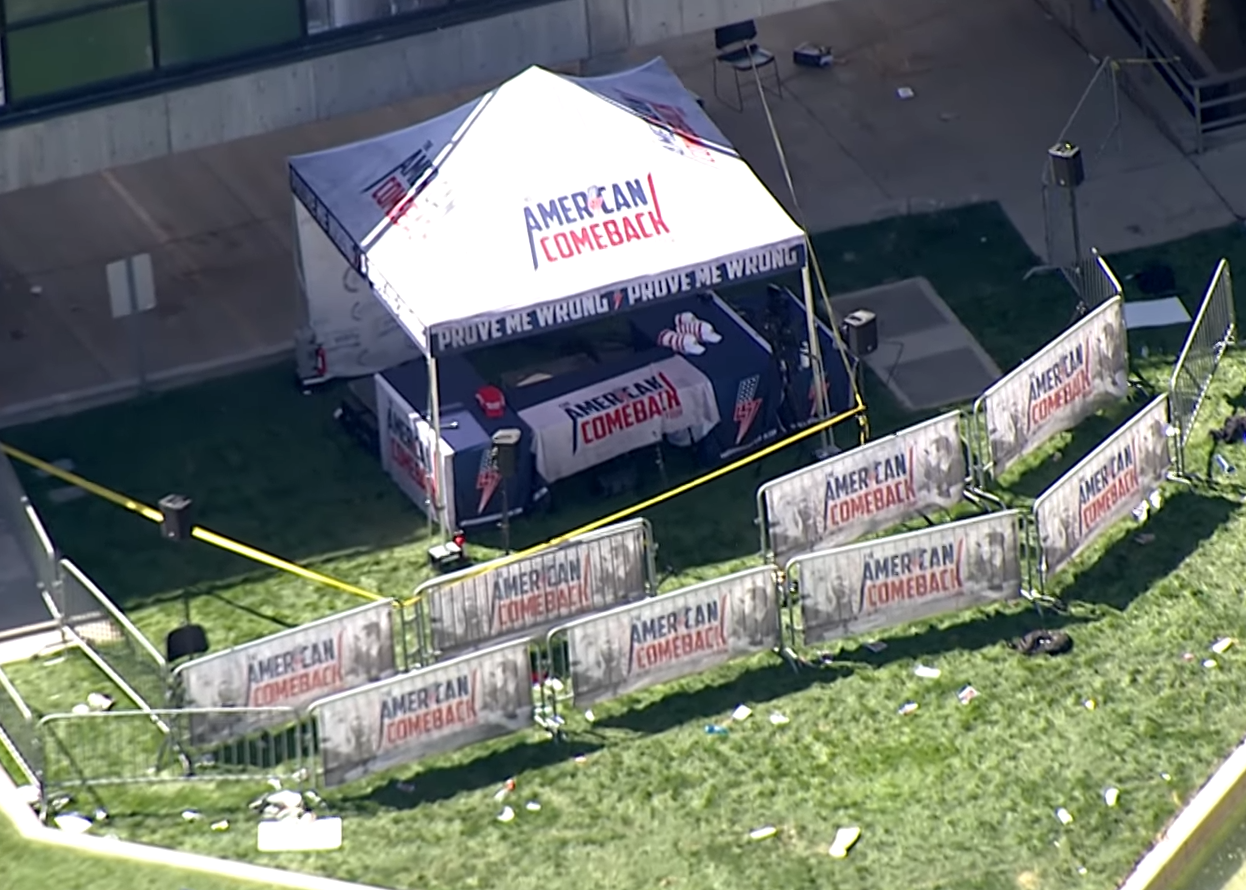
The tent in which Kirk was fatally shot, cordoned off with police tape

On September 10, 2025, while on stage at Utah Valley University in Orem, Utah, for a TPUSA event, "The American Comeback Tour", Kirk was fatally shot in the neck. The shooting took place at 12:23 p.m. MDT (18:23 UTC), around 20 minutes after the event began, in front of an audience of about 3,000 people. Kirk was taken to Timpanogos Regional Hospital in critical condition, where he was pronounced dead later that afternoon.

Authorities arrested the suspected shooter, 22-year-old Tyler James Robinson, in Washington, Utah, on September 12. Four days later, on September 16, he was charged with aggravated murder and other offenses.

=== Public vigil and memorial service ===
On September 14, a public vigil was held for Kirk at John F. Kennedy Center for the Performing Arts, and was attended by Trump administration officials and Republican lawmakers, including House speaker Mike Johnson, White House press secretary Karoline Leavitt, and Health and Human Services Secretary Robert F. Kennedy Jr.

A memorial service followed on September 21 at State Farm Stadium in Glendale, Arizona, which reached full capacity with a total turnout nearing 100,000 people. Prominent figures in attendance included President Trump, Vice President JD Vance, Kennedy Jr., and Defense Secretary Pete Hegseth. The list of speakers included political commentator Tucker Carlson, White House chief of staff Susie Wiles, and Kirk's widow Erika, who publicly forgave Robinson during her remarks.

=== Reactions ===
President Trump addressing the nation from the Oval Office about the shooting on September 10, 2025

Following the shooting and before Kirk was pronounced dead, Trump called for prayers for him on Truth Social. Several prominent political figures from both parties, including all living former presidents (Bill Clinton, George W. Bush, Barack Obama, and Joe Biden), echoed the sentiment, as did a number of international heads of governments, among other officials. Internationally, several vigils were held in honor of Kirk outside of the local U.S. embassies. The vigil in Vienna was attended by the youth wing of the far-right Freedom Party of Austria, as well as far-right activist Martin Sellner.

The American right demanded severe penalties for the individuals responsible for the assassination of Kirk. Steve Bannon, who previously served as an adviser to Trump, has advocated for widespread arrests and a stringent response towards universities. In the meantime, Hegseth instructed his staff to identify and discipline service members who either mocked or expressed approval of Kirk's murder.

In the days after Kirk's death, Americans were equally likely to have a favorable or an unfavorable opinion of him, with many having no opinion. Despite divided public sentiment, commentators and political allies have described Kirk as a major figure in the contemporary American right, citing his influence on youth activism, Christian nationalism, and the MAGA movement. Some politicians responded to the shooting by linking it to broader political debates. Republicans have accused liberals of "inciting violence with rhetoric", while Democrats have used the event to further discussions of gun control legislation. Trump and congressional Republicans received criticism for immediately blaming Democrats and liberal beliefs for the shooting, but without evidence, drawing allegations of exploiting the death for political gain. Responses of students and professors at universities to Kirk's death varied, including both outright celebrations of his death and vigils in his honor.

=== Aftermath ===
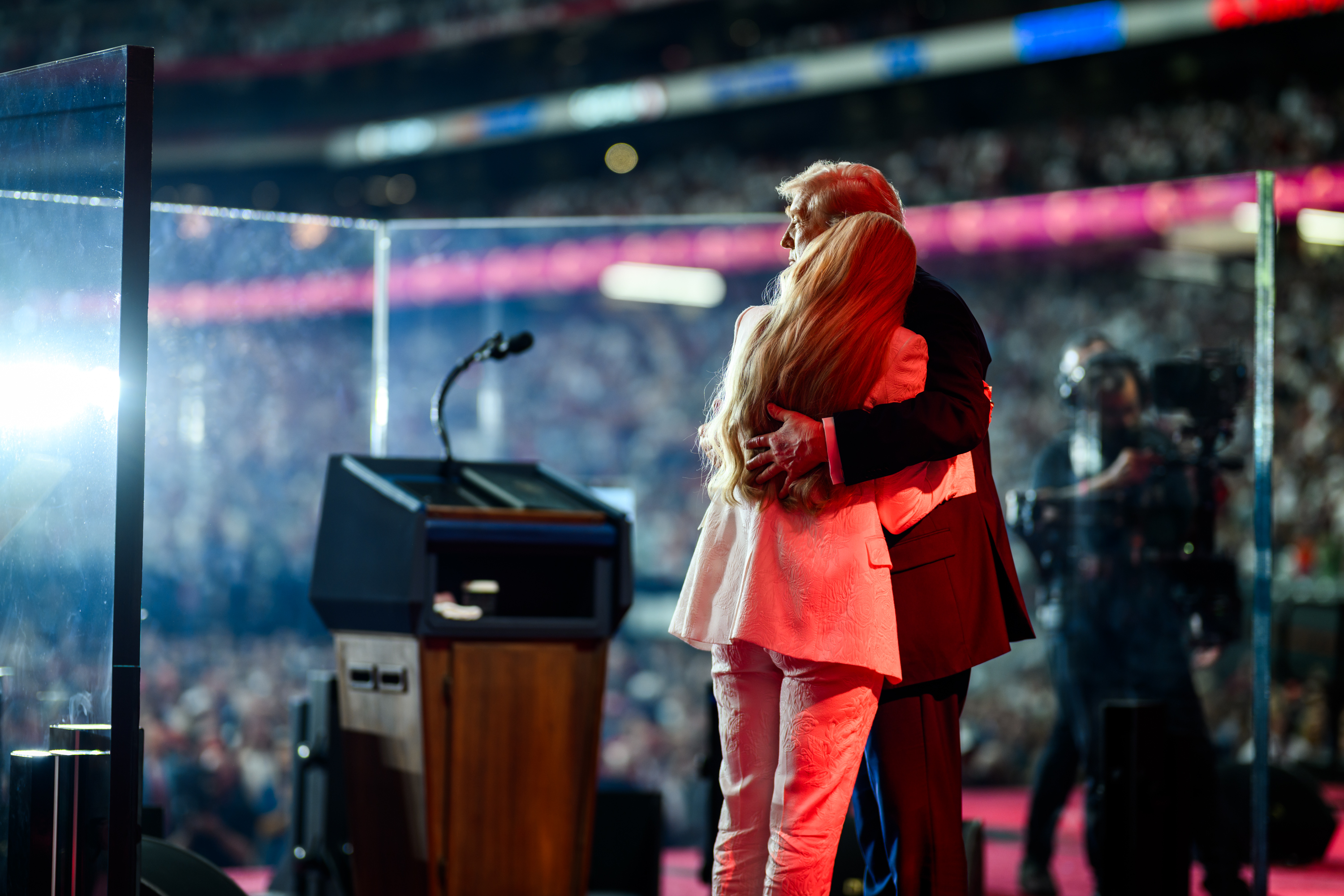
President Donald Trump embracing Erika Kirk at her husband's memorial on September 21, 2025

On September 10, 2025, following Kirk's assassination, President Trump ordered that the flag of the United States be flown at half-staff at the White House, on all public buildings and grounds, at all military posts and naval stations, and on all naval vessels of the federal government in the District of Columbia and throughout the United States and its territories and possessions, as a mark of respect for Kirk. The order remained in effect until sunset on September 14.

Far-right activists called for violence and retaliation in the aftermath of Kirk's assassination, with Laura Loomer saying "The Left are terrorists." and doxxed people they accused of celebrating or justifying Kirk's death. Right-wing activists and members of the Trump administration's initial demands—that people allegedly celebrating Kirk's death be silenced and fired—soon evolved into a campaign to punish people who expressed criticism of Kirk. The administration's involvement led to comparisons with McCarthyism and cancel culture; The New York Times called it "a conservative version of the cancel culture that only a few years ago was wielded by the American left", and said it was evidence of the rise of a "woke right". A USA Today analysis showed that by September 18 more than 100 people—including lawyers, doctors, first responders, and more than 50 high school teachers and college professors—had been censured, suspended, dismissed, or were under investigation. In response to the conservative and government campaign to silence critics of Kirk, especially following the suspension of comedian Jimmy Kimmel's show, various commentators and publications discussed the issues of cancel culture and free speech in the United States in the aftermath of Kirk's death, including among others Tucker Carlson, The Guardian, NBC News, Reuters, and USA Today. Natasha Lindstaedt, a professor in the Department of Government at the University of Essex, wrote that some scholars have argued that the characterization of Kirk as a political martyr is "part of a Trump administration campaign to vilify the liberal left."

== Legacy and recognition ==
Trump posthumously awarding Kirk the Presidential Medal of Freedom on October 14, 2025

In 2018, Kirk was listed on that year's Forbes 30 Under 30 under Law & Policy. In May 2019, he was awarded the honorary degree of Doctor of Humanities (D.Hum.) from Liberty University.

The New York Times said the Christian right saw Kirk as "the ultimate disciple" and now consider him to be a martyr.

On September 11, President Trump announced that Kirk would posthumously be awarded the Presidential Medal of Freedom. He formally bestowed the award on October 14. His widow, Erika, accepted it on his behalf. On September 13, the mayor of the city of Netanya, Israel, announced that a traffic circle in the city would be renamed in honor of Kirk. At Kirk's memorial service on September 21, Hillsdale College president Larry P. Arnn announced that he would be posthumously awarded an honorary degree. On November 12, the city council of Westminster, California, partially renamed a street in the city to Charlie Kirk Way.

On September 16, the commemorative AI-generated song "We Are Charlie Kirk" was released. It appeared on a Billboard chart and a Spotify chart. In March 2026, the Department of Education hung banners honoring Booker T. Washington, Catharine Beecher, and Kirk as American heroes.

In September 2026, on the one-year anniversary of Kirk's assassination, an eight foot bronze statue of Kirk was unveiled at the TPUSA headquarters in Phoenix. It was temporarily placed outside of the TPUSA facility, with plans to bring it inside at the end of the week for security purposes. The day after the statue was unveiled, it was vandalized with red paint smeared across the neck, face, and torso, as was a nearby Christian memorial poster. In response, Kirk's widow Erika stated that the damages would be repaired and that it would have no impact on his legacy, and the statue was promptly cleaned. Another statue of Kirk, called Freedom, was built and unveiled on the one-year anniversary as well and placed in Times Square.

Daily production of The Charlie Kirk Show continued despite Kirk's death.

== Books ==
Kirk was the author of several books. Along with Brent Hamachek, he co-wrote the 2016 book Time for a Turning Point: Setting a Course Toward Free Markets and Limited Government for Future Generations, which was published by Post Hill Press, a subsidiary of Simon & Schuster. Under the same publisher, Kirk wrote the 2018 book Campus Battlefield: How Conservatives Can WIN the Battle on Campus and Why It Matters. Donald Trump Jr. wrote the foreword for the book. In a review for The Weekly Standard, Adam Rubenstein described the book as a "hot mess", "nothing more than a marketing pitch for TPUSA", and said the "thin" book was "stuffed with reprintings of his tweets and quotes from others".

In 2020, Kirk wrote The MAGA Doctrine: The Only Ideas That Will Win the Future, which was published by HarperCollins. In its review for The New York Times, Gabriel Debenedetti wrote that "Kirk's musing about whether 'The Art of The Deal' might one day be considered a 'religious tract' comes just nine chapters after the book highlights the importance of 'a healthy dose of skepticism about authority figures and experts who think they knew best.' And that's just pages after its dedication to Donald Trump, which is five chapters before Kirk wonders whether Trump might 'be remembered as the president who brought about world peace.'" In Open Letters Review, Steve Donoghue said of the book that "On every page, Kirk writes something that's either trivially, casually wrong ... or just bipartisanly ridiculous".

In 2022, The College Scam: How America's Universities Are Bankrupting and Brainwashing Away the Future of America's Youth was published. In 2024, Right Wing Revolution: How to Beat the Woke and Save the West was released. In the book, Kirk argues that the United States is "under threat from a lethal ideology that seeks to humiliate and erase anyone that does not bow at its altar". His last two books were both released by Winning Team Publishing, a conservative publishing house co-founded by Trump Jr. A book written by Kirk, titled Stop, in the Name of God: Why Honoring the Sabbath Will Transform Your Life, was released by Winning Team Publishing on December 9, 2025.

== See also ==
- Charlie Kirk American Heritage Act
- Kirkification
