= Eva Furnari =

Italian-Brazilian children's book writer and illustrator

Eva Furnari (born 15 November 1948) is an Italian–Brazilian children's book writer and illustrator. She won the Prêmio Jabuti for children's literature seven times.

== Biography ==
Funari was born in Rome. Her family moved to Brazil in 1950, when she was two. She graduated in architecture at the University of São Paulo, and worked at Museu Lasar Segall from 1976 to 1979. From 1980 she began to venture into the publication of wordless picture books. Furnari has collaborated in the children's section Folhinha of the newspaper Folha de S.Paulo, in which she created one of her better-known characters, "Bruxinha".

In 2002, she was selected to illustrate a new edition of six children books by Érico Veríssimo.

She wrote more than 60 titles. One of them, Felpo Filva, was translated into English, as Fuzz McFlops.
