= Charles Clyde Ebbets =

American photographer (1905–1978)

- Born: August 18, 1905; Gadsden, Alabama, U.S.
- Died: July 14, 1978 (aged 72); Miami, Florida, U.S.
- Known for: photographer of Lunch atop a Skyscraper
- Spouses: Josephine Ward (m. 1928; d. 1931) Mary Green (m. 1932; div. 1937) Laurie Chase (m. 1938)
- Children: 2

Charles Clyde Ebbets (August 18, 1905 – July 14, 1978) was an American photographer credited with taking the iconic photograph Lunch atop a Skyscraper (1932).

== Biography ==
On August 18, 1905, Ebbets was born in Gadsden, Alabama, to Samuel, a newspaper circulation manager, and Minnie Ebbets. At age eight, he bought his first camera by charging it to his mother's account at a local drugstore. He married Josephine Ward on September 1, 1928, in Broward, Florida. His second wife was Mary Green, with whom he had a son, Charles. His third wife was Laurie Chase, whom he married in 1938.

== Early career ==
Ebbets started his career during the 1920s in St. Petersburg, Florida, as a still photographer. He eventually became involved in early motion picture work, both in front of and behind the camera. In 1924, he had a brief stint as an actor, playing an African hunter known as "Wally Renny" in several motion pictures. Throughout the 1920s, Ebbets had many other hobbies, including being a pilot, wing-walker, auto racer, wrestler, and hunter. He was also prizefighter Jack Dempsey's official staff photographer, a staff photographer for the Miami Daily News, and a freelance photographer.

In 1927, the first attempt was made to traverse the entirety of the dirt road from Miami to Tampa, called the "Tamiami Trail". Ebbets was chosen to be one of the three men making the trip by his extensive knowledge of the region and wildlife and his ability with a camera to document the adventure for newspapers and the Essex Motor Company who sponsored the trip and car. The photos of their success were carried in newspapers across the country.

== Lunch atop a Skyscraper ==
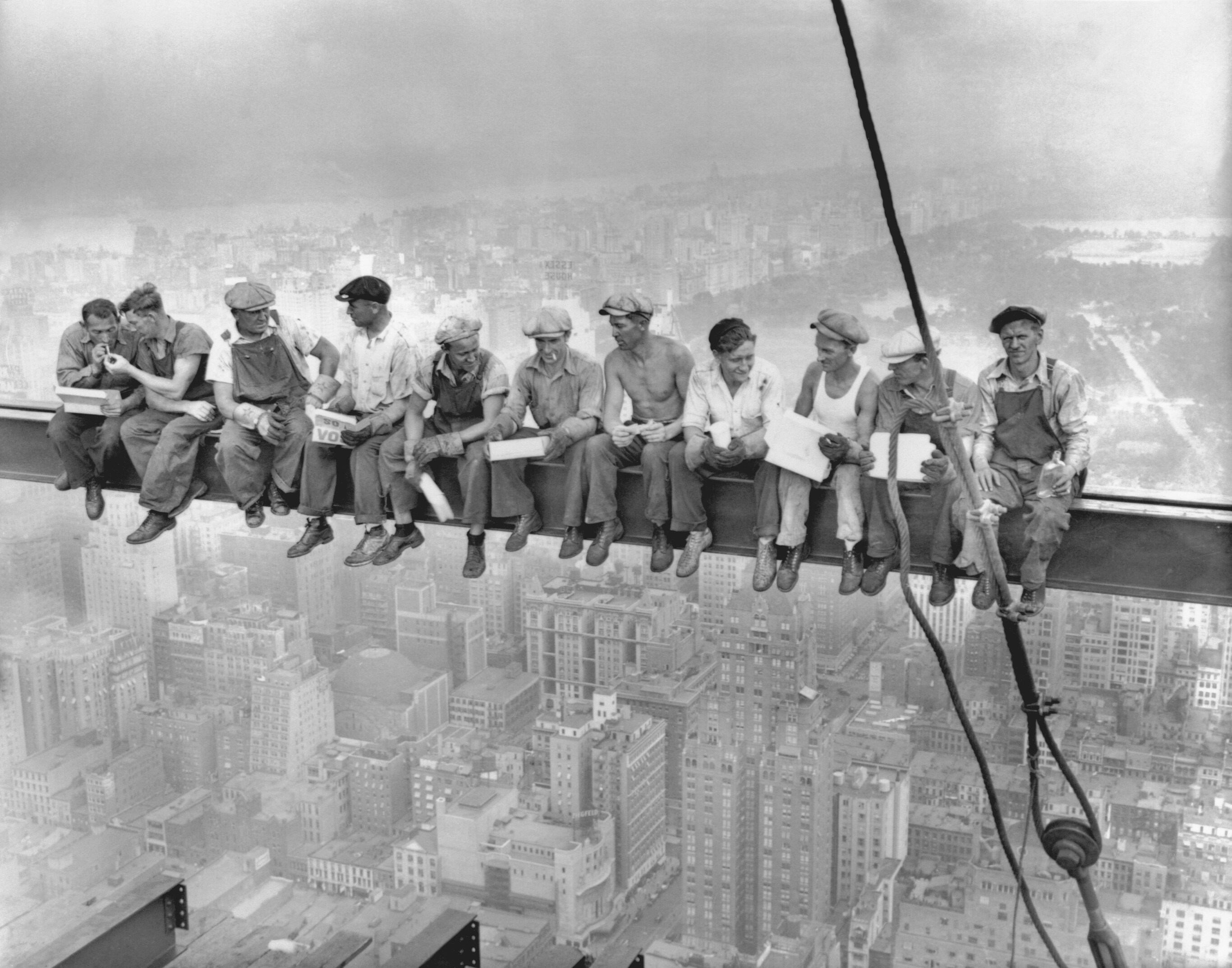
Lunch atop a Skyscraper

By the 1930s, Ebbets was a well-known photographer and published work in major newspapers across the nation, including The New York Times. In 1932, Ebbets was appointed the photographic director for the Rockefeller Center's development. On September 20, 1932, he took the photo Lunch atop a Skyscraper, which depicts eleven men sitting on a girder eating lunch, their feet dangling from the beams hundreds of feet above the New York streets. The photo was taken on the 69th floor of the RCA Building in several months of construction. It has been postulated that multiple photographers collaborated on the shoot. However, the Ebbets family has produced verified written records of Ebbets' authorship, including original receipts on Ebbets' professional letterhead showing his billing for the work done on the shoot, an original glass negative of Ebbets at work that day on the beam adjacent to the workmen, other authentic images taken by Ebbets during his work at Rockefeller Center, photos of the image displayed in Ebbets' office at Rockefeller Center, as well as copies of the original article from 1932 showing the famous photo which were found in his personal scrapbook. All of these documents supporting Ebbets' authorship have been independently verified by professional researchers, intellectual property attorneys, and private investigators. During the photo's worldwide circulation over the past 20 years, no other photographer nor any photographer's estate has ever claimed authorship of the famous image.

"The image was a publicity effort by the Rockefeller Center. It seems pretty clear they were real workers, but the event was organised with a number of photographers."— Ken Johnston, chief historian and archivist for Corbis Images

== Later career ==
In 1933 Ebbets moved back to Florida, where he lived and worked for the rest of his life. His interests were now focused on the exciting growth of tourism in the state, the Seminole Indians, and the vast expanse of untouched nature in the Everglades. In 1935, Ebbets became an official Associated Press photographer for the region. That same year, his photos of the infamous 1935 Labor Day hurricane that devastated the Florida Keys were circulated worldwide. During this era, he also founded the Miami Press Photographers Association and was its first president.

His extensive knowledge of the Everglades and closeness to the people of the region led to a friendship with many of the members of the Seminole Indian tribe. Over time, he counted many of the tribal leaders among his personal friends and was allowed unprecedented access to the villages and camps to document their lives in pictures. In 1938, he was the first white man ever allowed to witness their sacred Green Corn Dance and was permitted to photograph the entire week-long event. Many of these images were seen in the pages of newspapers throughout the country, and this extensive collection remains one of the finest of its kind in the world.

For the next decade, Ebbets continued his travel and adventures both on and off assignment and broke his back while shooting photos in the Everglades, an injury that kept him out of the military during World War II. However, because he was a licensed pilot and a photographer, he served as an attaché to the Army Air Corps Special Services and would later be assigned to Embry-Riddle Aeronautical Institute, which was training the American and British Royal Air Forces. During the war, he documented all phases of base development and personnel training in Florida and spent time in South America working under General "Hap" Arnold, who oversaw the training of American and British pilots at bases in Brazil.

Ebbets returned to his Miami home at the end of World War II and would be one of the three founders of the City of Miami Publicity Bureau. For the next 17 years, he was the chief photographer of the City of Miami. During this period, Ebbets would expand his collection of Everglades birds and wildlife images and would document the growth of Miami as a mecca of the tourist industry. He was a pioneer in creating some of the first cheesecake photographs that touted Miami as a winter respite for adventure and warm weather among beautiful scenery and people. His photographs were featured in the Miami Daily News, The New York Times, National Geographic, Outdoors Unlimited, Field & Stream, Popular Boating, U.S. Camera, Outdoor Life, Look, Popular Photography (the June 1938 issue featured an 8-page spread about Ebbets and his work), and others.

Throughout the 1970s, Ebbets continued to photograph life in the South Florida region. On July 14, 1978, at the age of 72, Ebbets died of cancer. At the time of his death, he had more than 300 nationally published images.

In 2003, he was honored at the Photo East Expo held at the Javits Center in New York by Corbis, with at least 21 of Ebbets' pictures. His daughter has established a website of some of his images which can be seen at EbbetsPhoto-Graphics.com, and is archiving and restoring his vast collection of pictures to be included in a book about his life and work.
