= Kouri =

Kouri may refer to:

- Wadi, dry watercourses
- Kouri Richins, a Utah mom who murdered her husband for financial benefit
- Donald Kouri, American physicist
- Kouri, Bazèga, a place in Burkina Faso
- Kouri, Gnagna, a place in Burkina Faso
- Kouri (Danzan-ryu Jujitsu Technique)
- Kouri, the creator of the horror game Ib

== See also ==
- Khouri
- Koury (disambiguation)
- Cowry
- Kauri (disambiguation)
- Koure (disambiguation)
- Kori (disambiguation)
- Kowri, a village in Afghanistan
- Kawri, a village in Syria
- Karri
- Kouri-Vini, Louisiana French-based creole language
