= Assassination of Charlie Kirk =

2025 assassination in Orem, Utah, U.S.

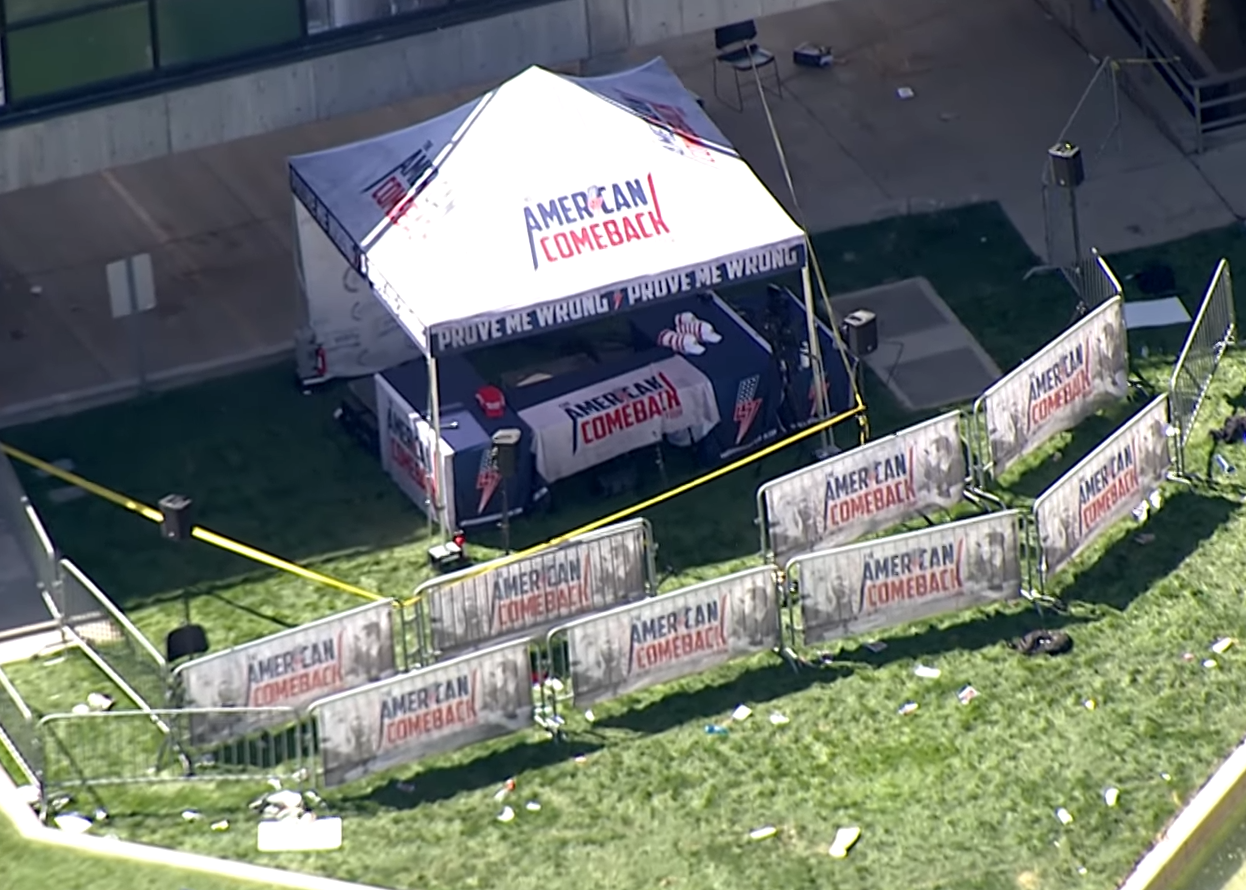
- The tent in which Kirk was fatally shot, cordoned off with police tape
- Location: 40°16′39.1″N 111°42′50.5″W; Utah Valley University; Orem, Utah, US
- Date: September 10, 2025; 1 year ago 12:23 p.m. (MDT; UTC−06:00)
- Target: Charlie Kirk
- Attack type: Sniper assassination
- Weapon: .30-06 Mauser-type bolt-action rifle
- Deaths: 1
- Accused: Tyler James Robinson
- Charges: 10 counts (Note: Aggravated murder; Felony discharge of a firearm causing serious bodily injury; Obstruction of justice (2 counts); Witness tampering (2 counts); Commission of a violent offense in the presence of a child; Victim targeting enhancement (3 counts))

On September 10, 2025, Charlie Kirk, an American right-wing political activist, was assassinated at Utah Valley University in Orem, Utah, while speaking at an outdoor campus debate planned by Turning Point USA, the conservative youth organization he co-founded and led. Kirk had been a key ally of US president Donald Trump and a highly influential figure in the Make America Great Again (MAGA) movement.

Shortly after the debate event began, with around 3,000 people in attendance, Kirk was fatally shot in the neck with a single bullet by a sniper positioned on the roof of a building approximately 142 yards (130 m) away. He was taken to a local hospital, where he was pronounced dead at age 31. A manhunt for the shooter ended the following day when Tyler James Robinson, a 22-year-old from Washington, Utah, surrendered to the local sheriff. Prosecutors charged Robinson with a total of ten criminal counts including aggravated murder, and announced they would seek the death penalty, alleging a politically motivated attack. Robinson pleaded not guilty to all charges on September 1, 2026. His trial is scheduled to begin on June 21, 2028.

The assassination was highlighted as an instance of increasing political violence in the United States and was condemned by national and foreign leaders. Social media reactions featured expressions of heartfelt messages from the left and right, anguish about political violence, and sharply divisive partisan takes. Trump, members of the Republican Party, and other conservative figures blamed members of the Democratic Party and left-wing or liberal beliefs before a suspect was in custody or a motive was identified.

The Trump administration called for a crackdown against what it called "political extremism" on the left, which was widely criticized by free speech advocates and legal experts as using the assassination as a pretext to silence political opposition. A campaign by right-wing organizations and US government agencies resulted in hundreds of firings or disciplinary actions against people seen as celebrating Kirk's death or making critical comments about him in the aftermath of the assassination. Kirk's memorial service was held at State Farm Stadium in Arizona on September 21.

== Background ==
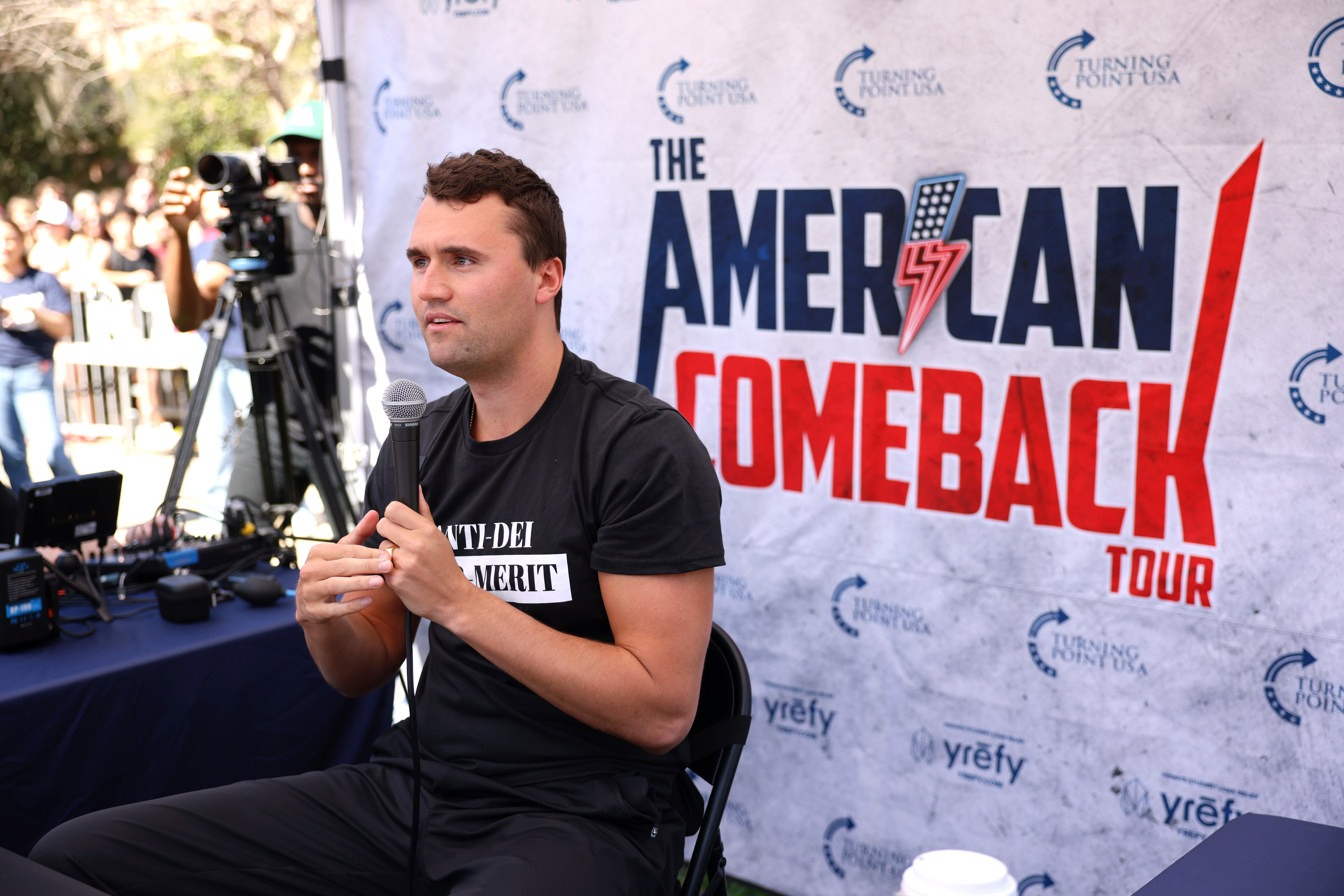
Kirk speaking at Florida State University during an earlier stop of his "American Comeback Tour" on February 28, 2025

Charlie Kirk was an American right-wing political activist and media personality, known for co-founding and serving as CEO of Turning Point USA. A close ally of President Donald Trump, Kirk used his skills in social media and campus organizing to become a highly influential figure in the MAGA movement. Described as "something of a kingmaker" by The New York Times and as a "youth whisperer" by The Guardian, Kirk was able to rally support to protect embattled Trump cabinet nominees and against Republican Party figures he deemed insufficiently, or fully non-supportive of Trump. The Washington Post described him as "one of the most prominent voices on the right" in recent years. Axios described Kirk as a "driving force" in Trump's presidential campaigns.

Kirk's assassination occurred during a period of deepening division and increasingly frequent violence in American politics. It followed a series of violent political incidents, including the January 6, 2021 attack on the US Capitol, the assassination attempts on Trump in July and September 2024, the December 2024 killing of UnitedHealthcare CEO Brian Thompson, the April 2025 arson attack on Pennsylvania governor Josh Shapiro's residence, the May 2025 killing of two Israeli embassy staffers in Washington, D.C., and the June 2025 shootings of two Democratic Minnesota legislators and their spouses. At a campaign event in Kentucky with Nate Morris in June 2025, Kirk himself spoke about the potential for violence. He told the crowd: "We're on the front lines where it's not always safe."

=== Kirk's Utah Valley University appearance ===
Turning Point USA announced on August 27 that Kirk would be visiting several college campuses during September–October 2025 as a continuation of a speech and debate series titled the American Comeback Tour, which began in February. Kirk's appearance at UVU was scheduled to be the first tour stop of the season. Kirk had previously visited UVU in 2019 for a Turning Point USA event which he hosted with conservative political commentator Candace Owens.

A petition was circulated calling on the university to cancel his tour appearance, but university officials permitted the speech, citing free speech and open discussion policies. Preventable flaws in how the event was coordinated and secured were revealed by Kirk's security director, including rooftop exposure, drone restrictions, and staffing gaps in the days before the event. Security was provided by six police officers and Kirk's private security personnel. Although the event was ticketed, the ticketing was not enforced. Metal detectors were not used for entry to the event.

== Timeline of the assassination ==
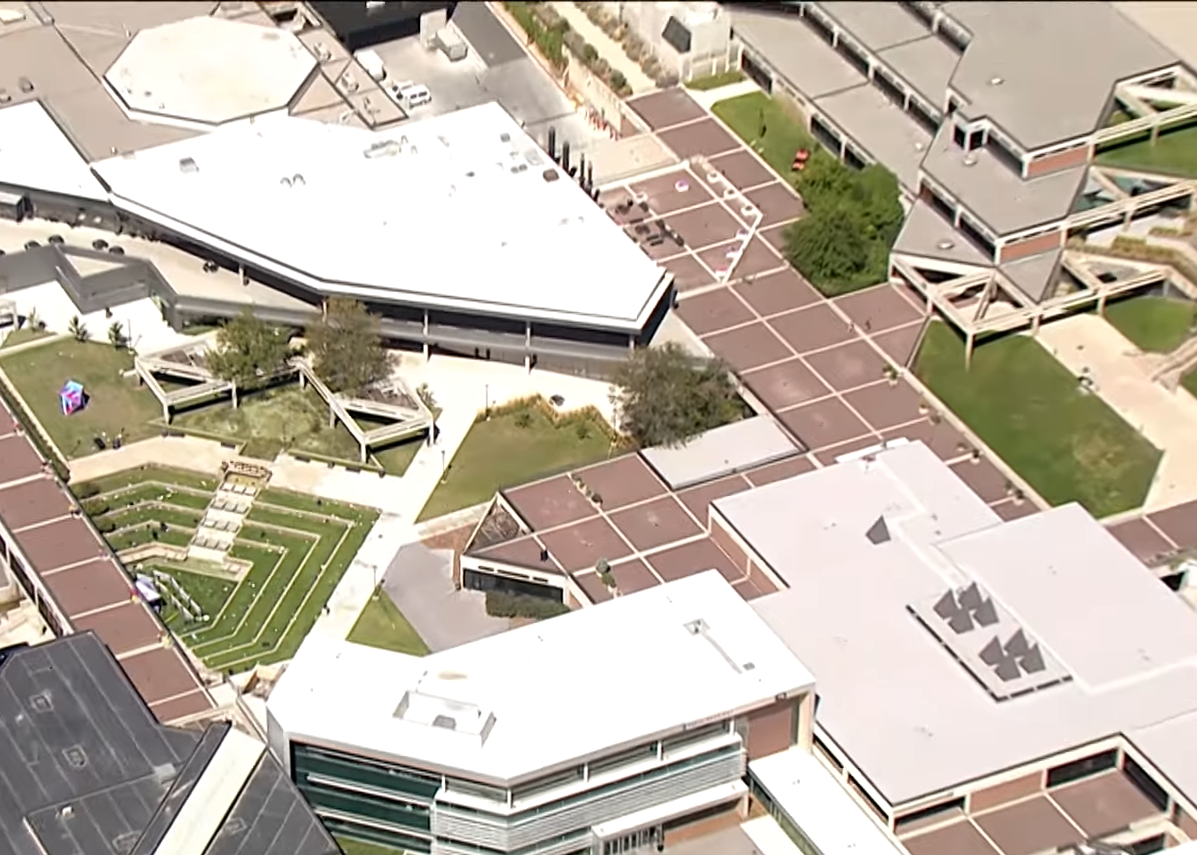
Kirk was under a tent in the grassy amphitheater at the bottom left; the shot reportedly came from the roof of the building at the upper right.

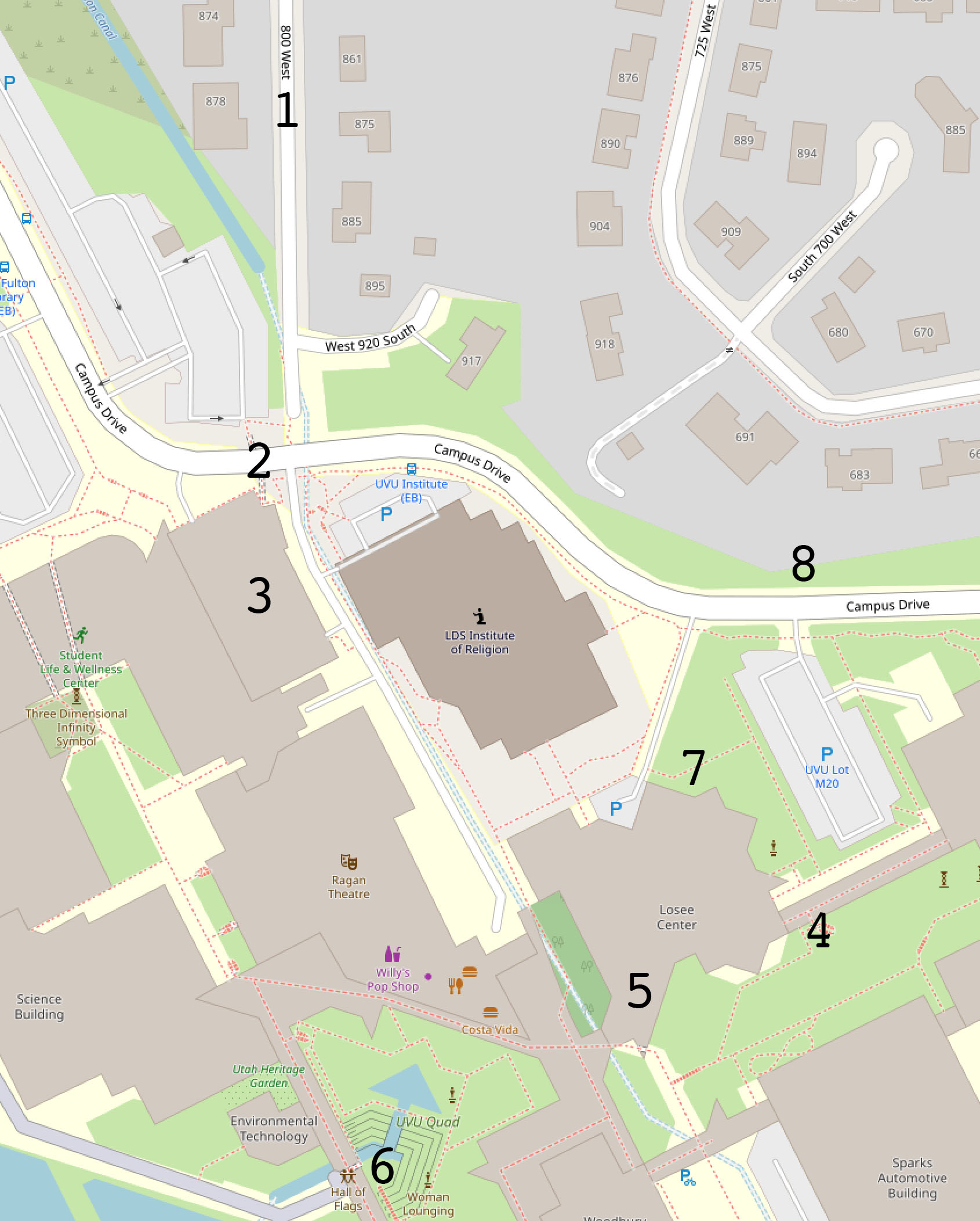
A map of locations: (1) suspect at 11:50 am, (2) pedestrian tunnel, (3) parking garage, (4) stairway to roof, (5) shooter on roof, (6) Charlie Kirk, (7) suspect drops to ground, (8) rifle found in wooded area

Officials stated the suspected gunman arrived on campus in a gray Dodge Challenger at 8:29 a.m. MDT (UTC–6). Security camera footage examined by investigators showed that he was dressed differently than he was around the time of the shooting.

Investigators said that the suspect reappeared on video at around 11:50 a.m., when he moved through a grassy area into a parking lot just north of the campus. (Note: The New York Times linked to this video, posted on September 11, 2025, by TMZ, and stated it seemed to show the suspect in the area described by the investigators. The article also includes a satellite view showing the movements of the suspect around this time, with a location labelled "Seen in TMZ video". The Washington Post published a satellite view with a nearby location labelled "TMZ video point-of-view".) He was wearing a black shirt with a United States flag at its center, a dark baseball cap, and large sunglasses. At 11:53 a.m., he stopped at the top of some stairs and "pulled out his phone" before proceeding down into a pedestrian tunnel. Still images released by the FBI show him ascending a stairwell in a parking garage adjacent to the tunnel.

The speaking event began at noon with about 3,000 people in attendance. Authorities said the suspected gunman was seen at 12:02 p.m. walking on the north side of the Losee Center, where they said he would later shoot Kirk from the roof. Kirk appeared at the event at about 12:09 p.m. and started throwing hats into the crowd. Then, at 12:11 pm, he began speaking.

According to an affidavit, the suspect entered the Losee Center from the southeast side and was seen ascending the stairs next to the building 13 minutes later. The stairs connected with a public walkway adjacent to the roof, and surveillance video showed the suspect crossed a railing from the walkway onto the roof at about 12:15 p.m. He disappeared from view for a short time before running across the roof, then crawling into the suspected shooting position. Investigators said that by 12:22 p.m., the suspected shooter was in position on the roof, lying on his stomach, facing the location where Kirk was speaking about 430 feet or 142 yards (130 m) away.

Sitting under a tent displaying the tour title, Kirk engaged in a back-and-forth discussion about mass shootings in the United States with Hunter Kozak, a UVU student and member of the Unfuck America Tour. Kozak asked, "Do you know how many transgender Americans have been mass shooters over the last 10 years?", to which Kirk responded, "Too many." Kozak followed up with, "It's five. Now, five is a lot, right? I'm going to give you — I'm going to give you some credit. Do you know how many mass shooters there have been in America over the last 10 years?" Kirk replied, "Counting or not counting gang violence?", and Kozak said, "Great."

Immediately following this exchange, at 12:23:30 p.m., Kirk was shot in the neck with a single bullet, which investigators believed had come from the roof of the Losee Center. Emma Pitts, a Deseret News reporter who witnessed the event, told NPR, "I just saw so much blood come out of the left side of Charlie's neck, and then he went limp." Former US representative Jason Chaffetz, who was in attendance, said, "As soon as the shot went out, everybody hit the deck and everybody started scattering and yelling and screaming."

At 12:23:55 p.m., six men carried Kirk to an SUV, which took him to Timpanogos Regional Hospital in Orem, where he was later pronounced dead. His death was announced by Donald Trump at 2:40 p.m. on Truth Social.

Video footage also surfaced of the suspected shooter running from the south corner of the Losee Center roof, where he purportedly shot Kirk, to the north corner, where the ground was higher and he could hang from the edge of the roof and drop to the ground, which occurred at about 12:24 p.m. Palm prints were later found at the edge of the roof, as well as smudges from which samples were collected to look for DNA evidence. A footprint was found on the ground, which showed he was wearing Converse sneakers. He then moved into a wooded area north of the campus, where a scoped rifle containing inscribed bullet casings was later found.

According to available audio, regional law enforcement became aware of the shooting no later than 12:26 p.m. At 12:31 p.m., an officer reported "gunshots heard near the library". At 12:35 p.m., the officer added "maybe the CS building", before describing the suspected shooter as "wearing jeans, black shirt, black mask, long rifle". A minute later, the officer elaborated, "on top of the building on the far north side, just east of the library". A UVU police officer was the first to investigate the suspected shooting position on the roof of the Losee Center. At 12:39 p.m. FBI agents and police chiefs arrived at the event location.

At 1:37 p.m., the university closed the campus and urged everyone to leave. At 2:01 p.m., the university instructed those remaining on campus to "secure in place until police officers can escort you safely off campus". Classes and activities at all campuses, including satellite locations, were suspended until September 15.

== Manhunt ==
FBI-released CCTV footage of a suspect jumping from the rooftop of a building following the shooting. The jumping starts at 18 seconds into the video.

The Utah Department of Public Safety was investigating the crime with the assistance of the Federal Bureau of Investigation (FBI) and the Bureau of Alcohol, Tobacco, Firearms and Explosives (ATF).

=== Initial arrests ===
Two people were arrested soon after the shooting, but were later released. One was arrested on campus grounds after claiming to have shot Kirk. He later told police he "was glad he said he shot the individual so the real suspect could get away." He reportedly had a history of mental health issues and was known to Utah authorities for his habit of disrupting public events. He was taken to a hospital, where police discovered over 20 images of child sexual abuse on his phone. After his release on September 14, he was admitted into jail for obstruction of justice and sexual exploitation of minors. On January 29, 2026, the man pleaded no contest to obstruction of justice, and pleaded guilty to two counts of sexual exploitation of minors. He was sentenced to 15 years imprisonment.

Hours after the shooting, FBI director Kash Patel announced on social media that "the subject" in Kirk's assassination had been apprehended; Utah governor Spencer Cox said that a "person of interest" had been detained. Within two hours of making his initial announcement, Patel said that the subject had been "released after an interrogation by law enforcement."

=== Evidence and leads ===
Law enforcement recovered an older-make Mauser-type Model 98 bolt-action hunting rifle, which was chambered in .30-06, from a wooded area near the shooting, engraved cartridges, and "a footwear impression, a palm print, and forearm imprints for analysis". In a press conference on September 11, officials said that they had "good video footage" and were applying facial recognition technology to it. Later that day, the FBI indicated that facial recognition efforts had been unsuccessful, released photographs of a person of interest, and offered up to $100,000 for information in the case. The FBI also investigated various social media accounts with posts that appeared to indicate foreknowledge of the assassination.

The investigators reported that cartridges found in the rifle were inscribed with various messages, which were rumored to be slogans relating to anti-fascist and "transgender ideology", but were described as a mix of Internet memes and popular culture after an FBI briefing on September 12 revealed the messages. The spent cartridge case was inscribed with "Notices Buldge OwO what's this?" [sic], a reference to furry online roleplay. Three unfired rounds were engraved with "hey fascist! CATCH! ↑→↓↓↓", referencing the directional button sequence used to call in a 500 kg bomb in the 2024 video game Helldivers 2, "O Bella ciao, Bella ciao, Bella ciao, Ciao, ciao!", a reference to the Italian anti-fascist song "Bella ciao" ("Goodbye (ciao) beautiful (bella)"), and "If you read This, you are GAY Lmao". The song "Bella ciao" remains widely known as an anti-fascist anthem; however, it also resurfaced in popular media in the mid-2010s and early 2020s through the television series Money Heist and the video games Hearts of Iron IV and Far Cry 6. During the manhunt, law enforcement agencies received more than 7,000 leads related to the incident and conducted more than 200 interviews.

=== Congressional hearings ===
FBI director Kash Patel testifying before the Senate Judiciary Committee on September 16, 2025

On September 16, 2025, FBI director Kash Patel faced questions from the Senate Judiciary Committee about the investigation and criticism for his social media posts about it. He stated that over 20 users on a Discord discussion group that Robinson was a part of would be investigated. Patel had previously faced criticism for his leadership and handling of the case from federal and local officials, with particular focus on his social media post on the day of the shooting that a suspect was in custody, a statement which he retracted 90 minutes later. The hearing led to bipartisan criticism of Patel, and came after a considerable upheaval at the agency under his leadership that involved widespread reassignments, firings, and loyalty tests.

The next day, on September 17, Patel faced questions from the House Judiciary Committee about the assassination. Patel used his opening statement to take credit for the decisions that he said helped lead to Robinson's arrest. Representative Jasmine Crockett criticized Patel, claiming "if it wasn't for [Robinson's] parents deciding that they were going to turn in their child, it seems like y'all wouldn't've got there."

== Accused ==
Robinson during a court hearing in December 2025

Tyler James Robinson (born April 16, 2003) was identified as the suspect. The day after the shooting, his parents convinced him to come to their residence in Washington, Utah, after they recognized his likeness from news images that authorities alleged were of the shooter. As they discussed the situation, Robinson allegedly implied that he was the shooter and that he planned on committing suicide to avoid imprisonment. His parents allegedly were able to talk him out of doing so, but he hesitated to turn himself in out of fear of being shot by police or a SWAT team being sent to his parents' house. His parents contacted a family friend who was a retired detective and sheriff's deputy. The retired detective called Washington County Sheriff Nate Brooksby (Note: On March 27, 2026, Brooksby resigned from the department following complaints of sexual harassment and allegations he had interfered with the investigation into an ethics violation by one of his deputies (unrelated to the Robinson case).) and made arrangements for Robinson to surrender. He and Robinson's father then drove Robinson to the sheriff's office the evening of September 11 and Robinson was taken into custody without incident.

The son of a social worker and a business owner, Robinson was raised in Washington, Utah, alongside his two younger brothers. Robinson's family are members of the Church of Jesus Christ of Latter-day Saints. Robinson's grandmother said most of the family are Republicans, and added that she did not know "a single Democrat." Childhood photographs show the Robinson family on trips to shoot guns and see weapons displays, including a visit to a military facility in 2017. In 2008, Robinson began attending Riverside Elementary School. He graduated from Pine View High School in May 2021, while earning college credit from Dixie State University (renamed to Utah Tech University in 2020) from 2019 to 2021. On May 31, 2022, Robinson and two family members appeared in a police body camera video being questioned by law enforcement after a traffic collision at an intersection. At the time of his arrest, Robinson was living in St. George, Utah, some 240 miles (390 km) southwest of Utah Valley University. He was in his third year of an electrical apprenticeship program at Dixie Technical College. He had previously enrolled at Utah State University but dropped out after one semester.

=== Investigation ===
Governor Spencer Cox said on September 12 that Robinson was the only suspect. The manhunt had lasted 33 hours. Prosecutors filed seven charges against Robinson, including aggravated murder, felony discharge of a firearm, obstruction of justice, and witness tampering. If found guilty of aggravated murder, Robinson could face the death penalty.

Investigators interviewed Robinson's roommate and romantic partner, who was not considered a suspect. His partner was described as being "aghast" and "shocked" by the shooting and denied having any knowledge of the crime. Governor Cox said that the roommate had been "very cooperative" with investigators, and had turned over private messages incriminating Robinson which discussed the "need to retrieve a rifle from a drop point, leaving the rifle in a bush, messages related to visually watching the area where a rifle was left, and a message referring to having left the rifle wrapped in a towel." The messages also referenced a scope and engraved bullets. The roommate was put under FBI protection until January 15, 2026. The roommate was also interviewed by law enforcement in April 2026 and said that after Robinson returned home the night of the shooting, he began to cry saying that he wished he never did it. The roommate also said that the following day, Robinson said that he intended on turning himself in.

Approximately an hour after the shooting, Robinson asked someone in a private Discord group chat of which he was a member if they saw the news. One of the other members said that Robinson looked like the man in the suspect images released by the FBI. Robinson reportedly joked that he had a doppelgänger who was trying to frame him, that the group should give him a cut of the FBI reward money for turning him in, that he would avoid going to McDonald's (a reference to Luigi Mangione, who was arrested at a McDonald's in Altoona, Pennsylvania, after killing UnitedHealthcare CEO Brian Thompson), and that he would get rid of his manifesto and rifle. Another recovered message, posted later the same day, read: "Hey guys, I have bad news for you all. It was me at UVU yesterday. im [sic] sorry for all of this. im [sic] surrendering through a sheriff friend in a few moments, thanks for all the good times and laughs, you've all been so amazing, thank you all for everything." A friend in the Discord group wrote the next morning that the confession appeared to be true while also calling for prayers, both for Robinson's repentance and for Kirk's family. Discord later suspended Robinson's account. On September 15, the FBI announced that Robinson's DNA matched that found on a towel that was wrapped around the suspected rifle and on a screwdriver found on the roof from where the shot was fired.

=== Views and possible motives ===
Robinson was registered to vote but not affiliated with any party, and there is no record of him voting in Washington County. Robinson had no criminal record prior to his arrest. While Trump and other elected Republicans have alleged Robinson was connected to left-wing groups and threatened a crackdown on them, sources familiar with the investigation stated that, as of September 21, 2025, no such evidence had been found.

On September 14, Governor Cox, a Republican, said that Robinson had very different political views than those of his conservative family and adhered to "leftist ideology". Cox did not provide specifics. According to Cox, Robinson appeared to have become radicalized after dropping out of Utah State University and may have been influenced by aspects of internet culture. Cox also said that one of Robinson's relatives had told investigators that during a family dinner, Robinson had expressed dislike of Kirk and discussed his upcoming visit to Utah Valley University.

On September 16, Utah County prosecutor Jeffrey Gray said that Robinson's mother told investigators that her son had become more political over the last year and had started to "lean more to the left, becoming more pro-gay and trans rights–oriented." According to ABC News, the charging documents did not "indicate the relevance of those stances or whether Kirk's remarks about those issues were a motivating factor". Gray further stated that Robinson had radicalized and grown detached from his conservative family. Robinson's family have since been visiting him virtually and occasionally in-person.

Gray outlined details of text messages that the prosecution believes Robinson sent to his roommate, which stated that he had been planning the shooting for just over a week. When the roommate asked why Robinson had done it, he answered, "I had enough of his hatred. Some hate can't be negotiated out." While talking with his father over the phone on September 11, Robinson allegedly told his father that he had killed Kirk because "there is too much evil and the guy [Kirk] spreads too much hate." ABC News reported, "Gray said he would let a judge determine whether the statements allegedly made constituted a confession."

== Legal proceedings ==
Robinson's first in-person court appearance on December 11, 2025

After his arrest, Robinson was transferred to Utah County Jail in Spanish Fork, where a judge ordered him held without bail. His arraignment was conducted by video feed on September 16 before Judge Tony Graf in the Utah County Justice Court in Provo. The charges included one count of aggravated murder, one count of felony discharge of a firearm, two counts of obstruction of justice, two counts of witness tampering, three counts of victim targeting enhancement, and one count of violence committed in the presence of a child.

Utah state prosecutors announced that they would seek the death penalty, citing aggravating factors; Robinson allegedly targeted Kirk for his political expression and had acted knowing children would witness the assassination.

On September 24, Salt Lake City attorney Kathryn Nester was appointed to defend Robinson. On September 29, Nester asked the judge for more time to review the large amount of evidence in the case before deciding if the defense would seek a preliminary hearing. On October 24, a judge heard arguments over whether Robinson would have to appear in court in a prison uniform and restraints, which the defense argued would undermine his right to a fair trial. On October 27, the judge ruled that Robinson could wear civilian clothes but must be physically restrained for security. The judge did prohibit members of the media from photographing or filming Robinson's restraints.

On November 5, following a motion from the prosecution to limit media coverage in the courtroom while Robinson was present, a number of media organizations, spearheaded by The Salt Lake Tribune, and including The New York Times, CNN, the Associated Press, and Fox News, filed a motion asking the court to notify them of any future requests to limit access to proceedings. Kirk's widow, Erika Kirk, supported the media's request.

Robinson made his first in-person court appearance on December 11. He made his next court appearance on January 16, 2026. On January 22, Erika, out of concern for the trial potentially being delayed, filed a speedy trial motion to the court to ensure Robinson was tried within a certain amount of time. On March 27, Robinson's attorneys filed a motion to delay future court proceedings, citing claims that an analysis from the Bureau of Alcohol, Tobacco, Firearms and Explosives (ATF) could not conclusively connect a bullet fragment recovered during Kirk's autopsy to the rifle allegedly used in the assassination.

In early May, Judge Graf ruled that cameras will be allowed in the courtroom. He also delayed the preliminary hearing due to the large amount of evidence in the case. On June 26, he held a prosecutor in contempt for violating a pretrial publicity order; however, he denied the defense's request to disallow prosecutors from seeking the death penalty.

The five-day preliminary hearing, originally planned for May, was held July 6–10. Though Erika Kirk requested that all evidence be made public, Graf decided that some evidence could be redacted. Following closing arguments for the preliminary hearing on September 1, Graf decided that Robinson would stand trial for aggravated murder. On this day, Robinson pleaded not guilty to all charges. His next court appearance was October 23. On November 9, Robinson's trial was scheduled to begin on June 21, 2028.

== Aftermath ==
=== Government ===
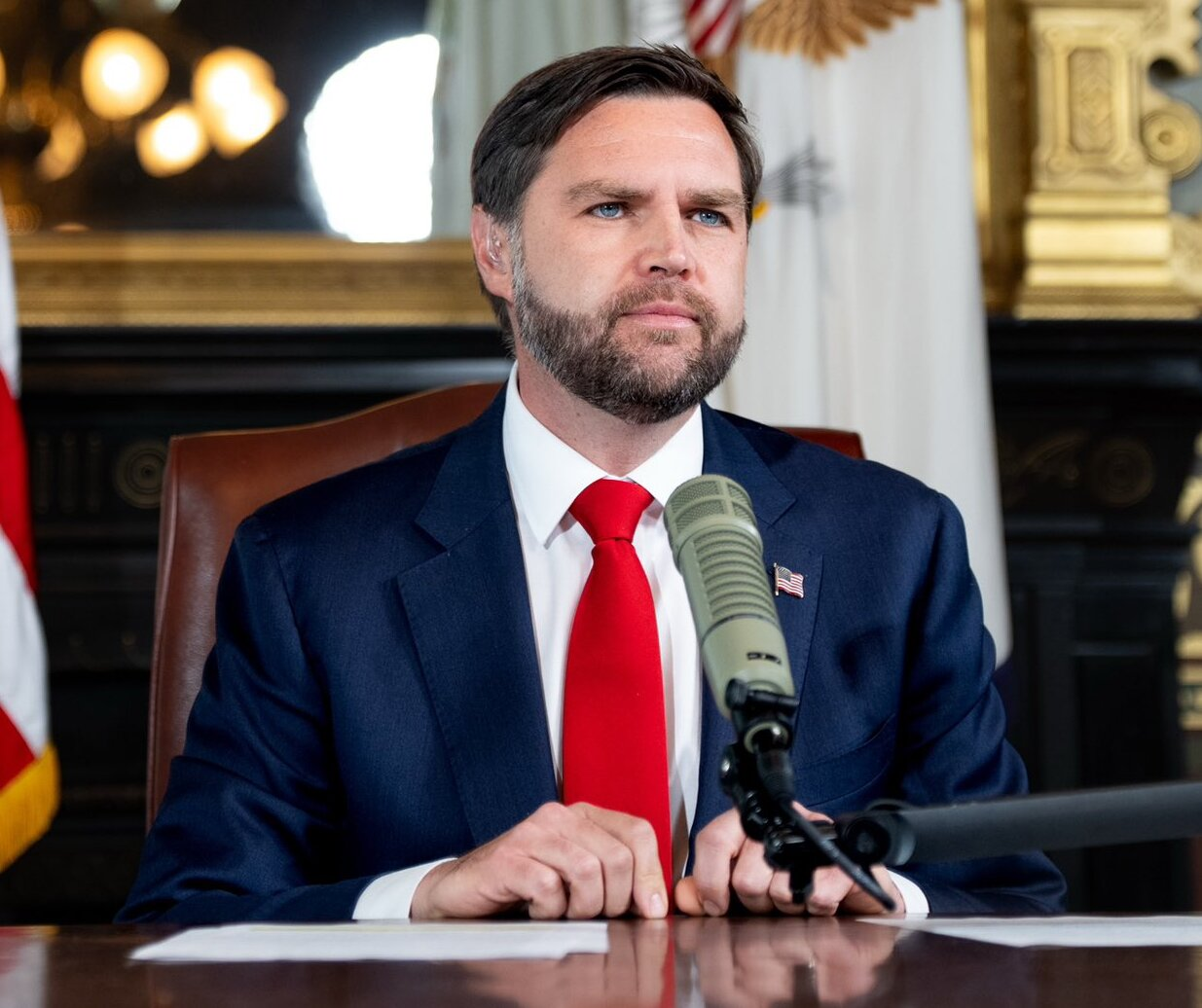
Vice President JD Vance hosting Kirk's podcast in his honor on September 15, 2025

Following Kirk's assassination, Republican government officials at the state and federal levels called on the public to turn in anyone who made statements about the assassination that were considered inappropriate or distasteful. The campaign later broadened to also include statements that were critical of Kirk. The New York Times described the campaign as morphing into a conservative version of "cancel culture". On September 15, the Trump administration threatened a widespread crackdown of liberal groups and donors, asserting that a network of liberal organizations promoted violence and would be dismantled. Trump stated he was looking into labeling some "terrorist organizations", and Vice President JD Vance promised to go after non-profits such as the Open Society Foundations and the Ford Foundation that had provided financial support for liberal and progressive causes. The New York Times suggested that First Amendment rights would make it difficult for the Trump administration to do so. The announcement came amidst the Trump administration's concurrent widespread crackdowns on political opponents and civil society.

The administration's threats against investigating and dismantling liberal groups received widespread criticism from free speech advocates and legal experts, who denounced the moves as using Kirk's assassination as a pretext to crack down on political opposition. NBC News described the Trump administration as appearing "to be using Kirk's assassination as an excuse to crack down on left-wing people and groups". In response to Trump's threats, 100 liberal philanthropies wrote an open letter defending their work and criticizing the administration's intentions to dismantle them, writing:

Organizations should not be attacked for carrying out their missions or expressing their values in support of the communities they serve. We reject attempts to exploit political violence to mischaracterize our good work or restrict our fundamental freedoms, like freedom of speech and the freedom to give. Attempts to silence speech, criminalize opposing viewpoints, and misrepresent and limit charitable giving undermine our democracy and harm all Americans.

Attorney General Pam Bondi received bipartisan pushback after stating the administration would target and prosecute some criticism against Kirk as "hate speech", including veiled criticism by Supreme Court justice Sonia Sotomayor. Bondi's comment was also criticized by some conservative political commentators, including Tucker Carlson and Erick Erickson. Following the comments by Bondi, Jonathan Karl of ABC News asked the president for his opinion on comments made by some of his allies who considered hate speech to be free speech. In response, Trump said that his administration would "probably go after people like you, because you treat me so unfairly, it's hate. You have a lot of hate in your heart." According to Fox News, Bondi lost confidence in FBI director Kash Patel due to his handling of the investigation and manhunt. A former federal prosecutor and legal analyst at MSNBC said Patel's actions could potentially hurt the accused's right to a fair trial.

Since Kirk's assassination, the US Department of Justice reportedly removed a 2024 study, titled "What NIJ Research Tells Us About Domestic Terrorism", which showed that white supremacist and far-right violence "continues to outpace all other types of terrorism and domestic violent extremism" in the United States, in contrast to statements made by the Trump administration. It was replaced by a notice saying: "The Department of Justice's Office of Justice Programs is currently reviewing its websites and materials in accordance with recent Executive Orders and related guidance. During this review, some pages and publications will be unavailable. We apologize for any inconvenience this may cause."

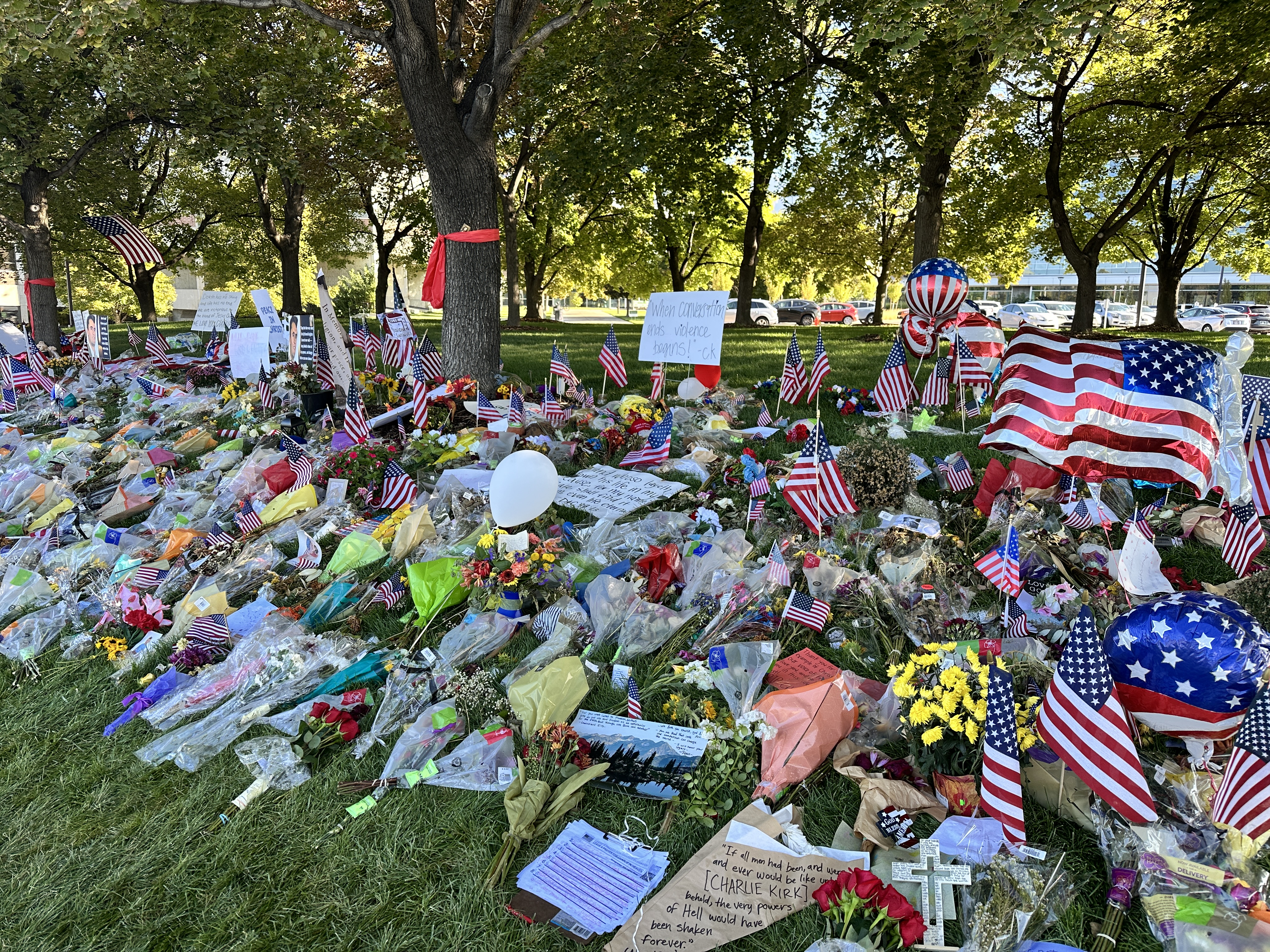
Close-up image of the memorial for Kirk on the campus of UVU on September 17, 2025

The US State Department said it would review the legal status of immigrants found to be "praising, rationalizing, or making light" of Kirk's assassination. White House Deputy Chief of Staff for Policy Stephen Miller said Kirk's assassination was the result of an "ideology" that is "at war with family and nature ... that leads, always, inevitably and willfully, to violence". He later vowed to "dismantle and take on" the violent radical left organizations in the United States by using "the power of law enforcement, under President Trump's leadership". On September 17, one week after the shooting, Trump declared that he would designate antifa as a terrorist group. On September 25, Trump signed a national security memorandum to direct the Justice Department, the FBI, and Joint Terrorism Task Force to focus on anti-fascist political violence "before they result in violent political acts", citing "indicators" such as anti-capitalism, anti-Americanism, and "hostility towards those who hold traditional American views". In January 2026, Utah Senator Mike Lee called for Robinson to be publicly executed. Robinson's lawyers argued that such comments by public officials may make it more difficult to find fair, unprejudiced jurors.

A whistleblower report shared by Illinois senator Dick Durbin in February 2026 stated that the FBI's shooting reconstruction team was delayed in reaching the scene by one day due to a plane and pilot shortage caused by FBI director Kash Patel's use of agency planes for personal use.

=== Funeral, memorials, and posthumous honors ===
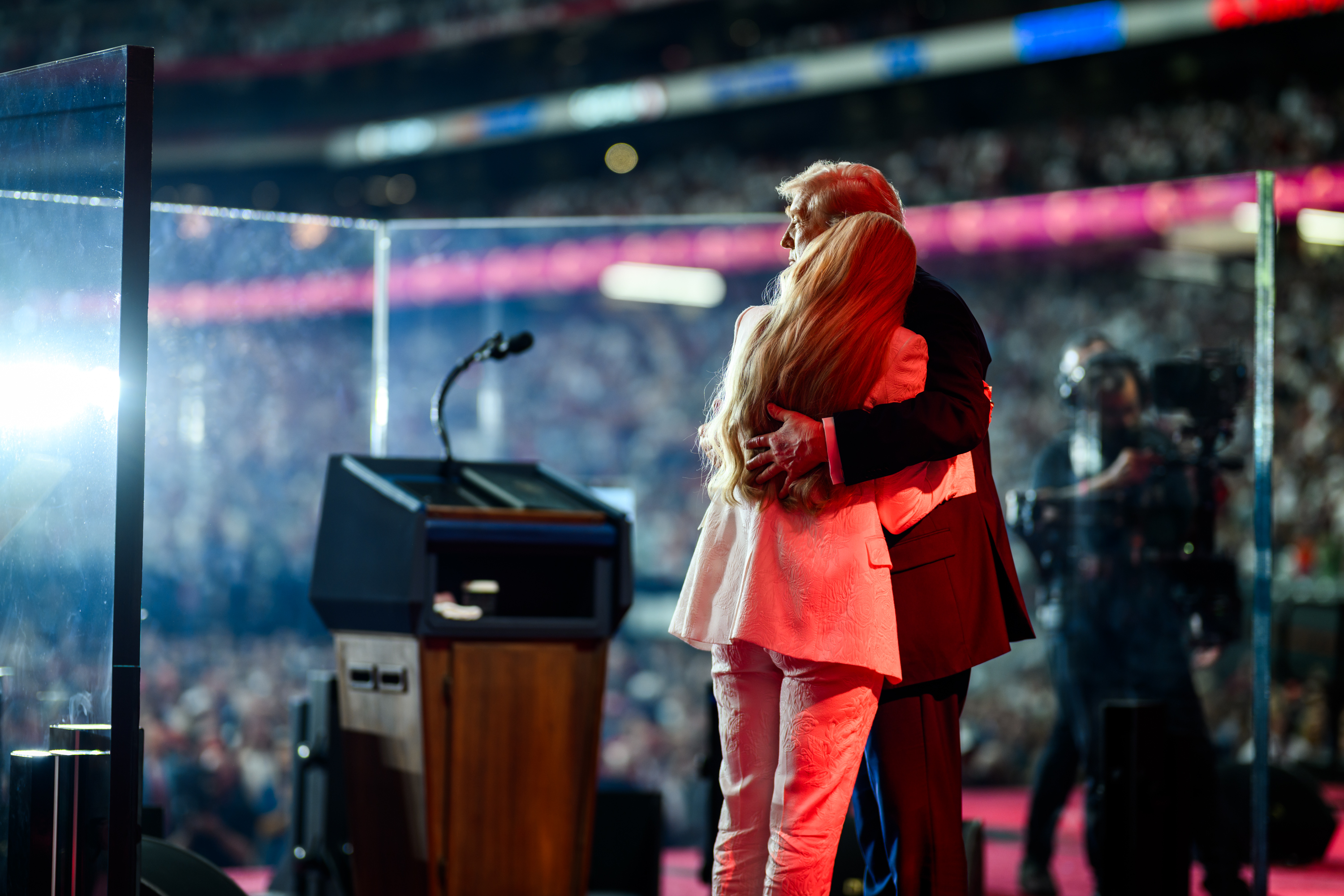
President Donald Trump embracing Erika Kirk at her husband's memorial on September 21, 2025

On September 11, Kirk's casket, accompanied by United States vice president JD Vance, second lady Usha Vance, and Erika, was transported on Air Force Two from Salt Lake City, Utah, to Phoenix, Arizona. Trump ordered all federal government flags to be flown at half-staff until September 14 at 6 p.m. in Kirk's honor. Critics noted that Trump had not done the same when Democratic Minnesota representative Melissa Hortman was killed in June. The New York Times criticized Trump's comments, and described him as abandoning the traditional presidential role as a unifier to instead blame his opponents and vow revenge. Trump later released a video tribute to Kirk and announced that he would be posthumously awarded the Presidential Medal of Freedom.

Also on September 11, a letter was published online from 16 Congressional Republicans to House speaker Johnson calling for a statue to be erected in Kirk's memory in the US Capitol. On September 15, New College of Florida announced plans to erect a statue of Kirk on its campus in Sarasota. Various government officials such as Karoline Leavitt, Mike Johnson, and Robert F. Kennedy Jr. gathered at a prayer vigil at the Kennedy Center on September 14 to honor and give remarks on Kirk's life and work. A memorial service took place on September 21 at State Farm Stadium in Glendale, Arizona, and was attended by Erika, Trump, Vance, and Elon Musk, among others. During the service, Trump said in part that Kirk "did not hate his opponents. He wanted the best for them. That's where I disagreed with Charlie. I hate my opponent, and I don't want the best for them." During an interview on Fox & Friends on September 19, Cardinal Timothy Dolan of the Catholic Church likened Kirk to "a modern-day Saint Paul".

=== Firings over comments ===
Following the assassination of Kirk, there were widespread terminations or suspensions of workers and students for comments or social media posts either celebrating Kirk's death or alleged to be critical of Kirk or of Republican efforts to capitalize on his death. At least 600 Americans were fired or disciplined in some way. Those fired included teachers, firefighters, and members of the military and US Secret Service; many received death threats. Politicians, public figures, and public and private-sector workers also faced firings, investigations, and suspensions over their comments about the killing.

Far-right activists like Laura Loomer called for violence and revenge and doxxed people they accused of celebrating or justifying Kirk's death. Reuters reported that some right-wing influencers who encouraged reporting social media posts had previously mocked political violence; Reuters cited comments from right-wing activists, including Kirk, about past events including the attack on Paul Pelosi. Several people were mistakenly identified as having made hateful comments about Kirk or his death, including a Wisconsin elementary school teacher and an IT technician for Walmart whose family had to flee their home after he was doxxed.

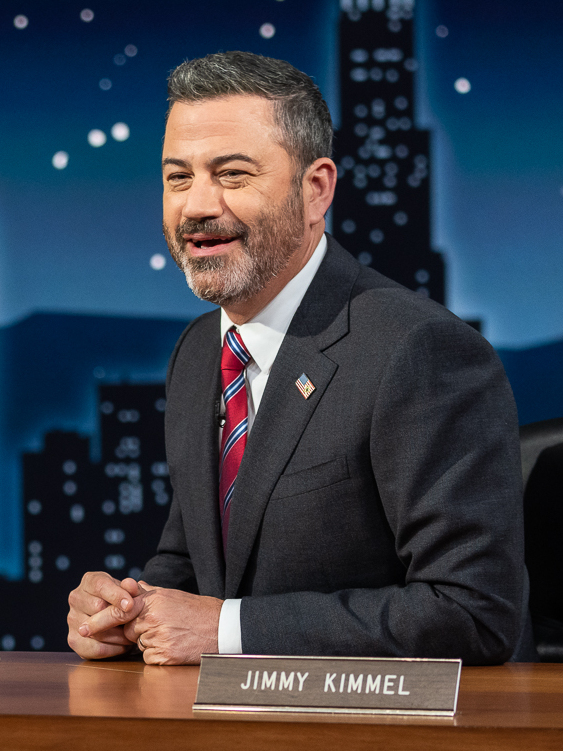
Jimmy Kimmel's show Jimmy Kimmel Live! was temporarily suspended following threats by the Federal Communications Commission to the show's broadcaster, ABC, to revoke its broadcast licences after Kimmel's comments on the assassination.

On September 12, comedian Jimmy Kimmel, on his ABC late-night talk show Jimmy Kimmel Live!, blamed Trump for not uniting the country after Kirk's killing and instead attacking Democrats. On the September 15 episode, Kimmel said the "MAGA gang" was "desperately trying to characterize this kid who murdered Charlie Kirk as anything other than one of them" and was trying to "score political points" from the crime rather than sincerely grieving. FCC chief Brendan Carr said Kimmel appeared to "directly mislead the American public" and threatened possible actions against ABC, including the revocation of the broadcast licenses of its owned-and-operated stations. On September 17, Nexstar Media Group announced that they would pre-empt Kimmel on their 32 ABC affiliated stations "for the foreseeable future". Nexstar had been seeking FCC approval for a $6.2 billion acquisition of Tegna Inc. at the time. ABC then announced that it would suspend the program indefinitely. Variety described the suspension coming after "several prominent conservatives have called for any critic of [Kirk's] work to be silenced, no matter how nuanced the argument may be". Kimmel's show ultimately returned days later after a public backlash.

On September 15, while hosting Kirk's podcast, Vice President Vance called on Americans to report those celebrating Kirk's assassination to their employers and promised to use the federal government to investigate and punish liberal organizations and donors. The Associated Press described the campaign as having "broadened to include even those whose statements were critical of Kirk without celebrating his assassination". Adam Goldstein of the Foundation for Individual Rights and Expression described the shift as a form of right-wing cancel culture, noting that people were being targeted for simply quoting Kirk or failing to mourn his passing adequately. Goldstein said that "government involvement in this does inch this closer to looking like McCarthyism". CNN reported that Disney employees and staff members received death threats and had their email addresses and phone numbers publicized. Senator Ted Cruz denounced the FCC's act by calling it "unbelievably dangerous for government to put itself in the position of saying, 'We're going to decide what speech we like and what we don't, and we're going to threaten to take you out there if we don't like what you're saying'", and noting that this behavior could be used against conservatives in the future.

Following Kirk's death, there were multiple cases where people who had been negatively impacted after comments made about his death received settlements resulting from lawsuits about their dismissals, and about alleged breaches of their constitutional rights. Employers and institutions have paid over $4 million in legal settlements as of July 2026 to individuals who had been fired or penalized over their online reactions to Kirk's death.

== Reactions and analysis ==
Shortly after Kirk's death, Erika spoke to viewers in a livestream from his old podcast studio at Turning Point USA's headquarters. She began the broadcast by thanking first responders, Kirk's staff, and the White House, and she pledged: "My husband's voice will remain." She also called for retribution on "evil-doers", stating: "You have no idea the fire that you have ignited within this wife, the cries of this widow will echo around the world like a battle cry." She vowed to continue carrying her husband's ideals and movement and told viewers that she would make sure his name would never be forgotten. In a later interview with The New York Times, Erika explained how she pushed to see Kirk's body against advisement by law enforcement. She reportedly told authorities, "With all due respect, I want to see what they did to my husband", before kissing him goodbye and stating that he looked like he died happy with a "Mona Lisa-like half smile".

=== Domestic response ===
President Donald Trump addressing the nation from the Oval Office about the shooting, September 10, 2025

Hours after Kirk's killing Trump blamed the "radical left" groups for the death and for rising political violence across the country, but cumulatively over decades most extremist killings in the US have been caused by right-wing perpetrators (excluding the 9/11 attacks). Despite Trump's claim that "the radicals on the left are the problem", from 2022 through 2024, all 61 political killings were committed by right-wing extremists.

The shooting saw bipartisan condemnation from politicians. Messages of sympathy came from United States president Donald Trump, vice president JD Vance, first lady Melania Trump, House speaker Mike Johnson, Senate majority leader John Thune, and former president George W. Bush, among other Republicans. Vance took over as host of The Charlie Kirk Show podcast for the September 15 episode, saying that he would not have become vice president without Kirk and vowing to carry his legacy forward.

Democratic politicians condemned the shooting, including former presidents Bill Clinton, Barack Obama, and Joe Biden, Senate minority leader Chuck Schumer, House minority leader Hakeem Jeffries, California governor Gavin Newsom, and Minnesota representative Ilhan Omar. Politicians linked the shooting to broader political debates. Several congressional Republicans blamed Democrats and accused the left of inciting violence with rhetoric. Democrats and several analysts countered that Trump's divisive rhetoric was also a factor in coarsening public debate, and that political violence had impacted both parties. Democrats also cited the killing to further discussion of gun safety legislation.

In his nationwide address, Trump solely blamed the radical left for Kirk's and other recent deaths, and did not mention recent Democratic victims of violence. NBC News called Trump's response "far more polarizing than many of the other messages offered by politicians and representatives of both parties". Several publications, including among others The Economist, The New York Times, PBS (republishing The Conversation), and Time, noted that contrary to Trump's accusations, most perpetrators of political violence have been right-leaning, a research finding that has been repeatedly confirmed. Days after the assassination, the Department of Justice deleted from its website "What NIJ Research Tells Us About Domestic Terrorism", a 2024 study from its National Institute of Justice that found that the majority of ideologically motivated homicides in the United States since 1990 (excluding the September 11 attacks) had been committed by right-wing extremists.

In response to Trump, Pennsylvania governor Josh Shapiro, himself the target of an arson attack some months earlier, said: "The president shouldn't cherry-pick what counts and what doesn't count. When he does that, it gives a pass to some. We can't have that. This is a moment where leaders need to speak and act with moral clarity, where we need to condemn this type of violence in our communities, in our politics." The next day, Trump stated: "We have radical left lunatics out there and we just have to beat the hell out of them", but later said he hoped his supporters would be nonviolent. During a Fox & Friends interview on September 12, when asked about the presence of radicals on both political sides, Trump responded: "I'll tell you something that's going to get me in trouble, but I couldn't care less. The radicals on the right oftentimes are radical because they don't want to see crime ... The radicals on the left are the problem." Trump's adviser Stephen Miller said that left-wing political organizations constitute "a vast domestic terror movement" and that "we are going to use every resource we have ... throughout this government to identify, disrupt, dismantle and destroy these networks". Opinion editors, as well as both far-right commentators and Trump critics, have compared Kirk's killing to the Reichstag fire—the 1933 arson of the German parliament building that Hitler used as a pretext to suspend civil liberties and prosecute political opposition—some calling the killing Trump's "Reichstag fire moment". Kirk's death has also been discussed in the context of "political martyrdom", where nations promote the martyrdom of deceased individuals. How Democracies Die author, professor Steven Levitsky, argued that exploiting Kirk's killing to justify unleashing attacks on critics is "page one of the authoritarian playbook".

Johnson held a 30-second moment of silence in the US House of Representatives for Kirk, observed by all House members. Following disagreements on the floor, the event descended into partisan rancor and accusations by both sides. Defense Secretary Pete Hegseth said that The Pentagon is "tracking ... very closely" any civilian and military employee who is a Kirk detractor or who celebrated his death, to impose punishment. Deputy Secretary of State Christopher Landau urged social media users to turn in foreign residents of the US who mocked or celebrated Kirk's death.

Elon Musk said in a video clip that "people of the left" were celebrating Kirk's death, commenting: "Whether you choose violence or not, violence is coming to you. You either fight back or you die." At the end of September, Musk called the Anti-Defamation League (ADL) a "hate group" and accused it of being anti-Christian in nature. This came after the assassination brought new attention to the ADL's inclusion of TPUSA, Kirk and the extremist Christian Identity movement in its documentation of alleged right-wing extremism and racism. Following the backlash from Musk and other prominent conservatives, the FBI cut ties with the ADL and Director Kash Patel made a statement condemning the ADL. ADL announced that it was retiring its "Glossary of Extremism" because "an increasing number of entries in the Glossary were outdated".

On September 10, 2026, governor of Utah Spencer Cox designated it "Charlie Kirk Day" in the state to mark the one-year anniversary of Kirk's death.

=== International responses ===
Kirk's death garnered messages of condolence from world leaders and foreign politicians. Argentine president Javier Milei, Australian prime minister Anthony Albanese, British prime minister Keir Starmer and foreign secretary Yvette Cooper, Canadian prime minister Mark Carney, Czech prime minister Petr Fiala, the French foreign ministry, Georgian president Mikheil Kavelashvili and prime minister Irakli Kobakhidze, Hungarian prime minister Viktor Orbán, Israeli prime minister Benjamin Netanyahu, Italian prime minister Giorgia Meloni, Mexican president Claudia Sheinbaum, New Zealand deputy prime minister David Seymour, Polish president Karol Nawrocki, Scottish first minister John Swinney, Serbian president Aleksandar Vučić, Swedish deputy prime minister Ebba Busch, and the Vatican City secretary of state Pietro Parolin offered their condolences and condemned the shooting. Salvadoran president Nayib Bukele criticized the media's coverage of the event. Paraguayan president Santiago Peña paid tribute to Kirk during a speech commemorating the 138th anniversary of the ruling Colorado Party. Pope Leo XIV expressed concern about political violence and prayed for Kirk and his family. Ukrainian president Volodymyr Zelenskyy cited the assassination as an example of "headlines about violent attacks happening all around the world" and offered his condolences during the 80th session of the United Nations General Assembly on September 24. Russian president Vladimir Putin offered his condolences and called the assassination a "disgusting crime".

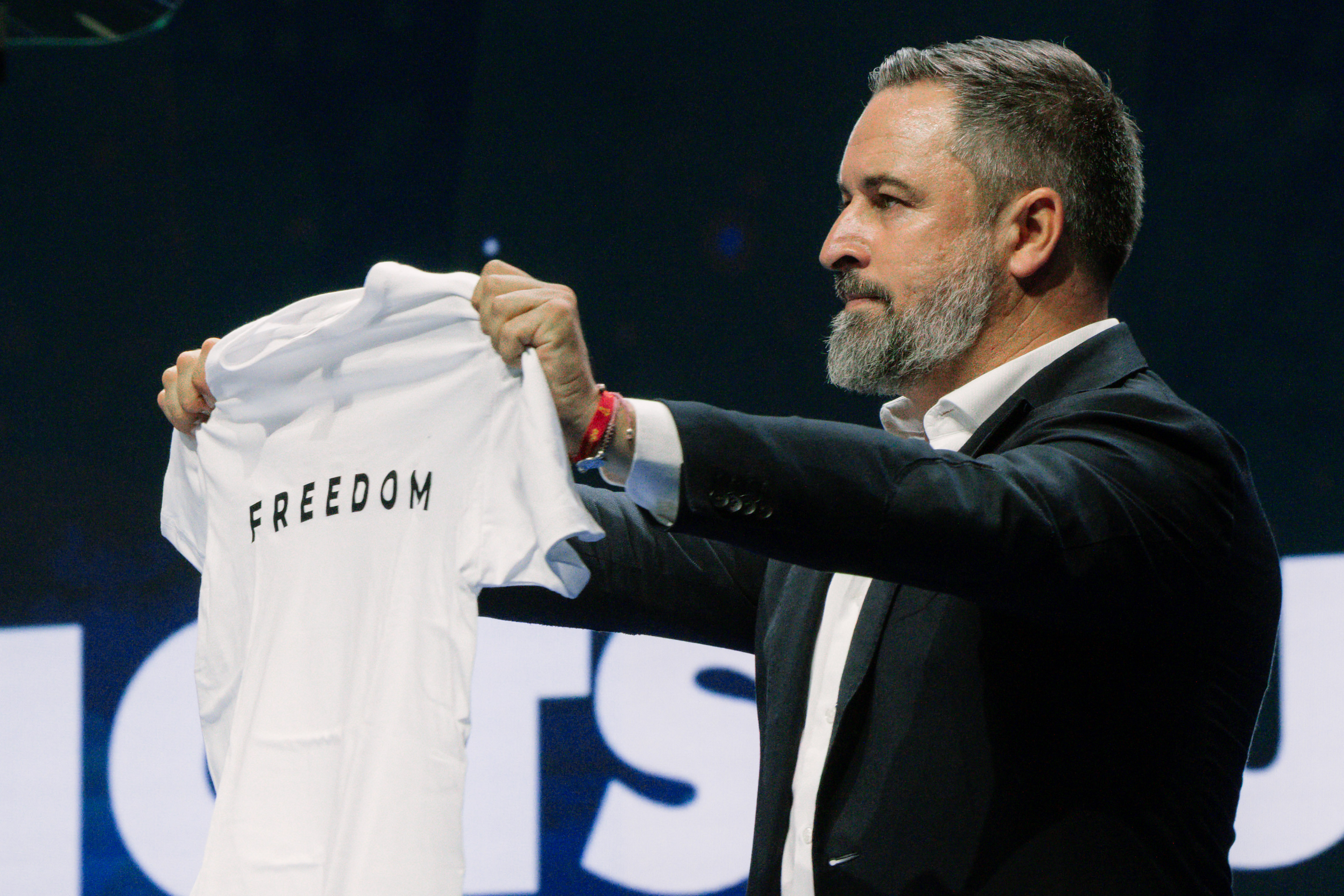
Spanish politician Santiago Abascal four days after Kirk's death, holding a shirt similar to the one Kirk had been wearing when he was shot

European right-wing populist leaders drew upon Kirk's killing to galvanize their supporters and denounce the left. Orbán, of the ruling Hungarian Fidesz party, linked Kirk's assassination to the attacks on the Czech former prime minister Andrej Babiš and Slovak prime minister Robert Fico and urged to "stop the hate-mongering left". Georgian president Mikheil Kavelashvili and Georgian prime minister Irakli Kobakhidze similarly linked the assassination to left-wing politics, with Kobakhidze claiming the assassination showed "where these so-called liberals and pseudo-liberals are dragging the modern world". Geert Wilders of the Dutch Party for Freedom said: "I repeat his true words that are valid for Europe as well: Islam is the sword the left is using to slit the throat of Europe."

Jordan Bardella of the French National Rally blamed the "dehumanising rhetoric of the left and its intolerance [which] fuels political violence" and Alice Weidel of Alternative for Germany said that Kirk had been killed by "a fanatic who hates our way of life". Matteo Salvini, Italian deputy prime minister and leader of Lega, said that he had "cried" over Kirk's death and wished to emulate him by talking directly to youngsters. In Spain, Vox and Patriots.eu president Santiago Abascal paid tribute to Kirk during his party's annual convention by wearing a shirt similar to the one Kirk had been wearing when he was shot. In the United Kingdom, Reform UK leader Nigel Farage paid tribute to Kirk in the House of Commons, saying he mourned the loss of a friend, and Tommy Robinson used the killing to mobilize support for the anti-immigration Unite the Kingdom rally in London on September 13.

On September 11, the European Conservatives and Reformists Group (ECR Group) and Europe of Sovereign Nations Group (ESN Group), the right-wing and far-right political groups in the European Parliament, put forward a motion to hold a minute of silence to honor Kirk. The motion was rejected by Parliament president Roberta Metsola, although Swedish ECR Group MEP Charlie Weimers was permitted to make a statement on Kirk's shooting before the voting session began. Weimers' attempt to yield part of his time for a moment of silence was interrupted by Parliament vice president Katarina Barley. French MEP Nathalie Loiseau of Renew Europe said that she had received death threats after opposing the minute of silence, and commented that even though Kirk was a victim, he "would have been considered a delinquent in France" for his "racist, antisemitic, and homophobic" opinions. Valérie Hayer, leader of the Renew Europe group, similarly said that the European Parliament should not honor Kirk because of his "supremacist, racist, anti-abortion, and pro-Russian" views. A moment of silence was held for Kirk at the Seimas (the Lithuanian parliament) on September 18 following a resolution from Lithuanian Farmers, Greens and Christian Families Union MP Rimas Jonas Jankūnas.

On September 18, Czech cardinal Dominik Duka celebrated a Requiem Mass for Kirk at the Church of Our Lady before Týn. The mass was attended by hundreds of worshippers, including politicians, while dozens of demonstrators gathered in front of the church holding banners describing Kirk as "fascist, racist and sexist".

Following the announcement of Kirk's killing, Russian state media said on social platforms that the United States was gearing up for a potential civil war. Chinese state media depicted the incident as indicative of a disordered and deteriorating society, afflicted by political turmoil and gun violence.

=== Media ===
News of Kirk's shooting and subsequent death dominated the day's news agenda, with major news networks entering into "breaking news mode" around 2:50 pm. ET, upon receiving word that Kirk had been shot in the neck area, with rolling coverage continuing throughout the day. Media organizations generally ran clips of the event that were truncated or otherwise censored to remove the image of the shooting.

Significant public interest in the event saw Fox News, MSNBC, and CNN all "drawing larger audiences than usual". On September 10, 2025, the three networks collectively averaged 6.9 million viewers, a 65% jump from the 4.2 million who watched a week earlier. September 11 saw the three networks draw a combined audience of 6.2 million, up 72% from the prior week's 3.6 million. On September 12, Fox News hosted a primetime special titled Charlie Kirk: An American Original. While condemning the shooting, left-wing publications including The National, The Nation, and The New Republic accused the mass media of "whitewashing" Kirk's career.

Fox News host Jesse Watters commented: "They are at war with us ... We're going to avenge Charlie's death in the way he would want it avenged ... Charlie would want us to put as much pressure on these people as possible."

Left-wing streamer Hasan Piker, who had been due to debate Kirk later in September, called the killing a "terrifying incident" and said, "The reverberation of people seeking out vengeance in the aftermath of this violent, abhorrent incident is going to be genuinely worrisome."

In November 2026, at a stand up event in Madison Square Garden, comedian Dave Chappelle made a comment based on his feelings on Kirk's assassination, in which during his stand up, he went on to say: "I feel fucked up saying this. Its scary being a public figure, and I mean look, ever since that guy, Charlie Kirk, got murdered, and I shouldn't say; this publicly, but I feel better!" Chappelle was immediately met with swift and intense backlash from conservative media outlets and members. Kirk's widow Erika would shortly go onto condemn Chappelle's words, calling it "beyond disgusting" and criticizing the surrounding culture that resulted after her husband's death. Some also pointed out how Kirk also previously defended Chappelle when he was attacked on stage in May 2022.

=== Popular culture ===
The same day of the assassination, American website Jezebel took down a previously published satirical article from September 8 titled "We Paid Some Etsy Witches to Curse Charlie Kirk" that referenced Kirk's rhetoric and people "selling" hexes on Etsy and updated it with a new headline and text to emphasize that it was a humorous piece that had no intention of bringing harm to anyone. On the night of Kirk's assassination, Comedy Central cancelled all scheduled reruns of the South Park episode "Got a Nut", in which the character of Eric Cartman portrays a parodic version of Kirk. This followed an online campaign to have the show cancelled over its satirical portrayal of Kirk shortly before his death. Kirk himself had called his parody in South Park "hilarious". In the week following his death, several professional sports events held moments of silence for Kirk. According to the Hindustan Times, some individuals expressed outrage on social media towards National Football League teams who did not hold a moment of silence.

On September 12 and 13, country singer Morgan Wallen dedicated his song "I'm a Little Crazy" to Erika in performances in Edmonton. On September 14, Coldplay frontman Chris Martin mentioned Kirk's family during the segment of the group's Music of the Spheres World Tour where he asks the audience to send love out into the world, adding: "You can send it to people you disagree with, but you send them love anyway." On the same day, English rap duo Bob Vylan mocked Kirk's death at a concert in Amsterdam, with frontman Bobby Vylan saying, "if you talk shit, you will get banged. Rest in piss, Charlie Kirk, you piece of shit." (Note: Vylan's imperative was variously transcribed as "rest in peace" or "rest in piss".) Subsequently, a Vylan concert in Tilburg was cancelled by the venue. On September 16, an AI-generated song credited to Spalexma, "We Are Charlie Kirk", was released on music streaming services. It briefly topped Spotify's viral songs chart and made it onto Billboard's Hot Christian Songs chart. Comedian Pete Davidson referenced Kirk's killing in the 2026 The Roast of Kevin Hart.

==== Social media ====
News of Kirk's death prompted fervent reactions on social media. The New York Times described social media as featuring heartfelt messages from the left and right, anguish about political violence, and sharply partisan and political takes. Mentions of, and comparisons with, the Reichstag fire and the murder of Horst Wessel soared. A remark Kirk had made in 2023—"It's worth to have a cost of, unfortunately, some gun deaths every single year so that we can have the Second Amendment to protect our other God-given rights"—was reposted numerous times on social media after the shooting. Another clip resurfaced and went viral, in which he said: "I can't stand the word empathy, actually. I think empathy is a made-up, new-age term that does a lot of damage." Several far-right figures encouraged retaliatory violence against Democrats and saw the death as a recruiting event. Before the shooter's identity and motivations were known, several influential right-wing voices called for vengeance and war. In the days after the shooting, social media platforms including Meta, YouTube, Reddit, and Bluesky issued statements denouncing posts that glorified Kirk's killing, which in extreme cases included incitement to commit violence against other right-wing commentators, or media figures like J. K. Rowling.

According to the Associated Press, uncensored videos showing Kirk being shot spread across social media with "lightning speed". The videos were generally described as "graphic" or "gory", leading to an expectation among some that they should be censored, although the videos did not necessarily violate platform policies. To the extent that calls for censorship came from Republican politicians, Politico noted an apparent "whipsaw" in that many social media companies had previously "dismantled many of their safeguards against toxic content — in many cases to avoid Republican criticism". The Tech Transparency Project, a nonprofit watchdog organization, reported that Instagram's teen accounts, which are designed with "additional safety features for teens", could readily find videos of the shooting. Organizations that monitor media for children, including Common Sense Media and parental controls app Bark, reported spikes in traffic following the shooting as parents sought out advice on how to talk to their children about it and prevent them from seeing the video. The day after the shooting, most of the graphic videos had been removed from social media, although they still showed up in searches and algorithmic feeds, particularly on Twitter and TikTok. Asked about Kirk, Senator Chris Coons blamed the Internet for the extremist politics of the United States, and touted widespread Congressional support for the Kids Online Safety Act, a proposed law that CBS News characterizes as an effort to "protect children from dangerous online content". The audio of the gunshot that killed Kirk became a meme on TikTok.

On September 10, 2026, Erika Kirk marked the one-year anniversary of Kirk's death by sharing a black-and-white photo on Instagram of her and Charlie holding hands on their wedding day, along with the caption: "… Until heaven". Other social media users began using the terms "Kirkiversary", "Kirkmas", and "Kirkentine's Day" as dark jokes intended to deride the one-year anniversary of the assassination. Netflix UK were forced to issue a denial after users on X accused the company of making a joke about Kirk's assassination after a post promoting The Gentleman, with the caption "nearly did himself a neck injury", was shared on the same day as the anniversary of Kirk's death.

==== Use of artificial intelligence on social media ====
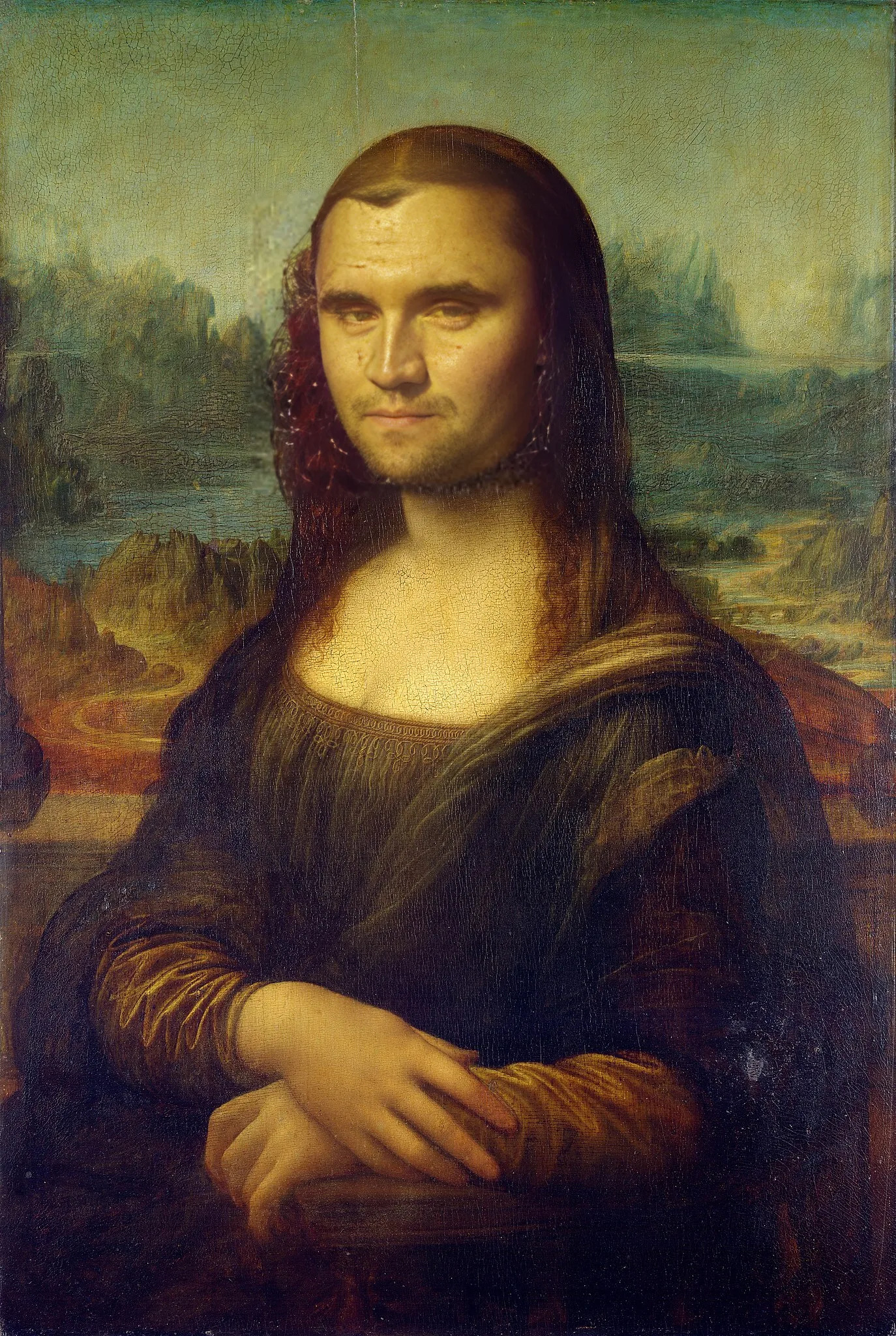
A "kirkified" image of Mona Lisa, created with an AI face swap tool

Artificial intelligence was presumably used in posts on social media by supporters and mourners of Kirk to memorialize him, including posts by megachurches depicting him being welcomed into heaven by Jesus. Additionally, a trend arose to create and spread AI-generated "Kirkified" meme images pasting Kirk's likeness onto the faces of popular culture figures or random people.

=== Public reaction ===
==== Opinion polling ====
Public concern about political violence was high after Kirk's killing. In a September 12 YouGov poll, 87% agreed that political violence is a problem. 18% of liberals and 7% of conservatives interviewed said that political violence "can sometimes be justified". Of those aged 18–29, 22% agreed, while only 3% over 65 did. YouGov said that public attitudes have varied over time depending on the identity of the victims, with concern rising more after an attack on a member of one's own party. Other outlets noted earlier polls with differing results: in a May 2025 poll, roughly 20% of both parties considered violence "acceptable" for political ends, while in two polls from 2023 and 2024, roughly 10% of Democrats and 30% of Republicans said that violence may be "necessary".

According to G. Elliott Morris, polling exaggerates approval of political violence; research by Bright Line Watch has found that less than 5% condone violent felonies to achieve political goals, with little difference between parties. Furthermore, individuals tend to significantly overestimate approval of violence within the other party, and are less likely to support it themselves when informed of the actual statistics.

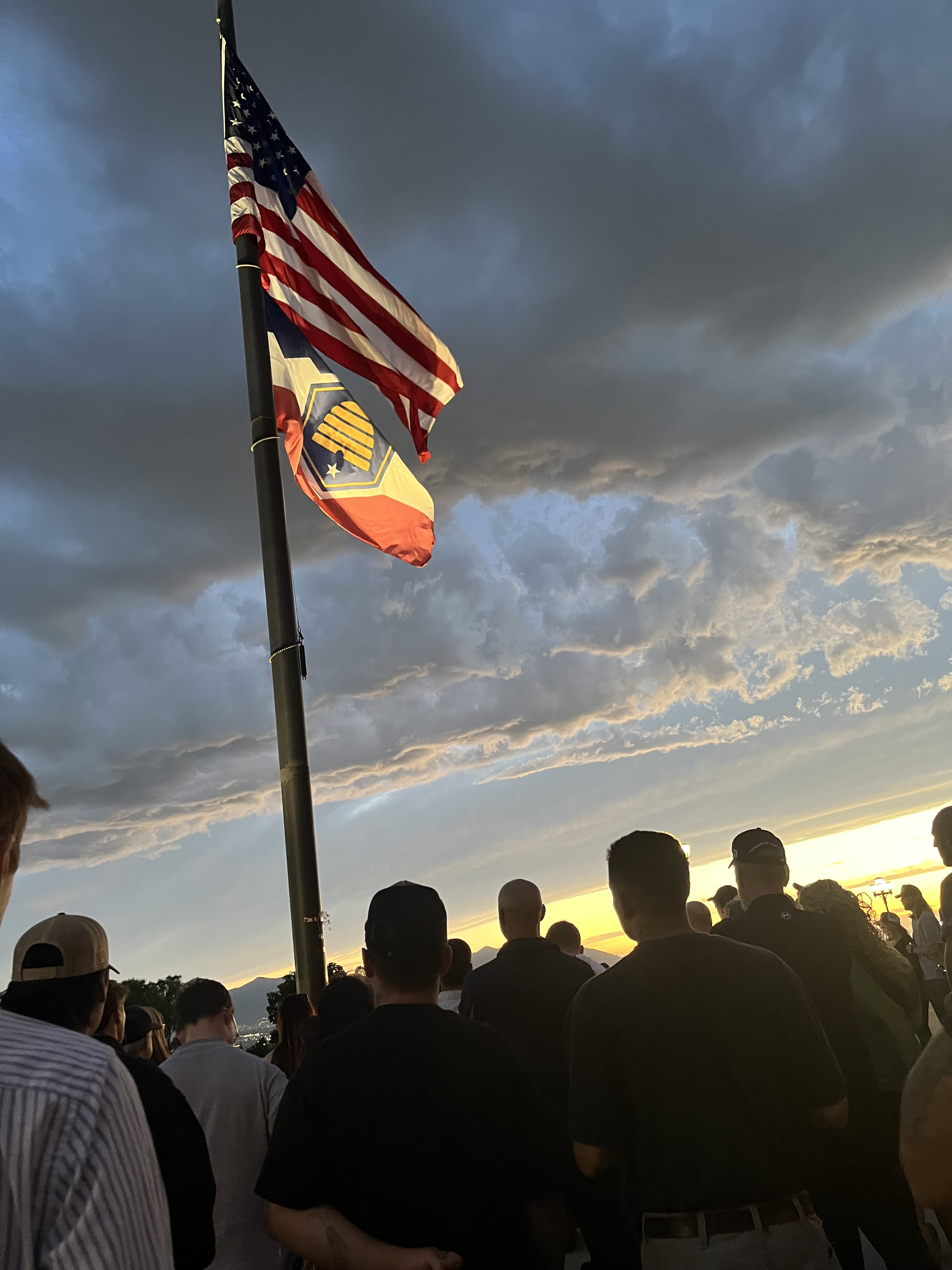
A memorial held for Kirk at the Utah State Capitol on September 11, 2025

The day after the shooting, a YouGov poll asked if it was acceptable to be happy at the death of a public figure; 56% said it was never acceptable, 22% said it was usually unacceptable, 6% said it was usually acceptable, and 3% said it was always acceptable. Republicans were more likely than Democrats and independents to say that it was always rather than usually unacceptable. In a September 14 poll, 51% said that the person who assassinated Kirk was driven by political beliefs, including 63% of Republican, 44% of Democrats, and 46% independents. 40% of respondents were not sure of the political affiliations of the killer; 24% said they believed he was a Republican (41% of Democrats and 13% of Republicans); 21% a Democrat (40% of Republicans and 8% of Democrats); and 15% affiliated with neither.

A September 19 Associated Press–NORC Center for Public Affairs Research poll found a surge in negative sentiment amongst Republican voters in the aftermath of Kirk's assassination. Just 49% of Republican voters said they felt the country was headed in the right direction, compared to the previous June 2025 survey, in which 70% of respondents who identify as Republican said the country is heading in the right direction. The same poll found 8% of Democrats said the country is moving in the right direction, down from 12% in June, and 14% of independents, down from 23% in the June poll.

==== Vigils and donations ====
Following Kirk's death, a mural and memorial site were set up on the Utah Valley University campus, close to the site of the shooting. Candlelight vigils—mostly, but not exclusively, organized by Turning Point—took place in various cities across the United States. Similar vigils were also held in Albania, Australia, Canada, France, Germany, Italy, Malta, Spain, South Africa, South Korea, and the United Kingdom. Several online fundraisers were set up in Kirk's name to honor his legacy and provide financial support for his family. By September 14, the different fundraisers had received donations of over US$6 million.

== Conspiracy theories ==
Disinformation about Robinson was widely shared on social media by both the political left and right, including a doctored photo of him wearing a pro-Trump shirt, and false claims he was a registered Republican, had donated to Trump's campaign, or was a registered member of the Democratic Socialists of America. China, Iran, and Russia spread disinformation using social media bots to inflame divisions and promote their foreign policy objectives. Artificial intelligence tools such as Grok, Perplexity AI, and AI Overviews also disseminated misinformation.

Political consultant Roger Stone said the attack appeared to have been "a professional hit either by a nation state, rogue elements of our own government or a terrorist organization". One theory, promulgated by Russian state media RT, centered on people standing near Kirk, who were purported to have made "unusual gestures" before he was killed. Several senior Russian officials, including former president Dmitry Medvedev and Kremlin special envoy Kirill Dmitriev, speculated on social media about a connection between Kirk's killing and United States support for Ukraine because Kirk had been a critic of Western financial and political support for Ukraine in its conflict with Russia. Other conspiracy theories included that Kirk had faked his death and had hidden a blood bag under his shirt, that Robinson was a scapegoat for the actual assassin, that Kirk was killed by shrapnel from an explosive planted in his microphone and not by a bullet, and that the assassination was a false flag operation to divert attention from the Epstein files.

Following the publication of alleged text messages between Robinson and his partner in the September 16 indictment, commentators on both sides of the political spectrum speculated that they were faked or scripted. Conspiracy theory experts said such speculation is routine, and criminal law expert Steven B. Duke stated: "There is nothing in those messages making it even plausible that they were written by law enforcement."

=== Statements by Candace Owens ===
Political commentator Candace Owens, who was a friend and employee of Kirk, spread various conspiracy theories about the circumstances surrounding the assassination. Owens shared theories that suggested various groups may have been involved in the assassination, including Kirk's security team, and the governments of France, Israel, or Egypt. Kirk's widow, Erika, responded to Owens' claims in an interview, saying; "Stop. That's it. That's all I have to say. Stop." In December 2025, Owens and Erika subsequently had a meeting that the latter described as "a very productive conversation."

In January 2026, Owens stated that Kirk "thought that he was a time traveler," that he may have had some foreknowledge about his own death, that there were "agents that surrounded him throughout his entire life," and that Kirk had been "marked since he was a child." She released what she alleged was an "off-putting" leaked audio recording of Erika speaking days after Kirk's death.

=== "Transgender ideology" misinformation ===
Conservative commentators speculated that the shooter was transgender because Kirk was answering a question about transgender mass shooters when he was shot. The New York Times noted that this was "a grim coincidence that has fed into online conspiracies and speculation"; and Hunter Kozak, who asked Kirk the question, later said: "I couldn't have asked a worse question." More transgender conspiracy theories were spread after it was reported that the suspected shooter had a transgender partner, with some speculating that Robinson may have been motivated to kill Kirk because Kirk had been a proponent of the unsubstantiated claim that mass shooters disproportionately tend to be transgender. In a May 2026 counter-terrorism strategy pamphlet, the White House characterized Kirk's assassin as "a radical who espoused extreme transgender Ideologies [sic]" and cited the killing in its directive to target "anti-American, radically pro-transgender, and anarchist" groups.

Early reporting in The Wall Street Journal incorrectly said that messaging related to "transgender ideology" was inscribed on the bullets used in the assassination, citing an internal bulletin of the ATF. The New York Times reported that a senior law enforcement official with knowledge of the case said that the bulletin had not been verified, and that it did not match other summaries of evidence. The actual inscribed messages did not contain any references to transgender identity, and the Human Rights Campaign published an open letter demanding a retraction and a public apology, saying: "This reporting was reckless and irresponsible, and it led to a wave of threats against the trans community from right-wing influencers—and a resulting wave of terror for a community that is already living in fear." The Wall Street Journal later amended the story with a note from the editor but did not issue a retraction.

=== Purported Groyper motive ===
Social media users speculated that one of the inscriptions found on the bullets could be a reference to the far-right Groyper culture, based in part on the adversarial stance that the Groypers had towards Kirk, such as during their 2019 heckling campaign. Axios described these speculations as "baseless". Nick Fuentes also rejected the speculation, stating that his followers were being "framed".

=== Alleged involvement of Israel ===
In the days immediately following Kirk's assassination, conspiracy theories emerged about the involvement of Israel. Many sources, including Israeli media, have stated that these theories are rooted in antisemitism. Some commentators attempted to link the event to the Israeli Mossad, to Kirk's comments about the Epstein files, or Kirk's claims about Epstein being "a creation of either Mossad [or] Israeli Intelligence". Maram Susli resurfaced an August 2025 post by an Infowars host who stated that Kirk believed "Israel will kill [him] if he turns against them." Tucker Carlson was accused by some pro-Israel groups in the United States of making antisemitic comments at the service for Kirk by suggesting he supported the conspiracy theory that Jews or Israel were responsible for the assassination. Carlson said that Kirk's assassination reminded him of the death of Jesus Christ, whom he said was killed by powerful people for telling the truth.

Israeli prime minister Benjamin Netanyahu rejected the theories, calling them "insane" and issuing multiple video messages claiming no Israeli government involvement in the assassination.

On October 6, right-wing commentator Candace Owens revealed private WhatsApp group messages where Kirk claimed to have "no choice but to leave the pro-Israel cause" due to having lost $2 million from a Jewish donor over his refusal to condemn Tucker Carlson. A day later, Turning Point USA spokesman Andrew Kolvet published a video confirming the authenticity of the leaked text messages. However, no evidence has been uncovered demonstrating the text messages and Kirk's assassination to be connected.

== See also ==
- Gun violence in the United States
- Gun violence in U.S. schools
- NSPM-7 – 2025 US President Trump national security directive
- Political violence in the 2024 United States presidential election
