= Kaure =

Kaure may refer to:

- Kaure language, a Papuan language
- Kaure, Gurdaspur, a village in Punjab, India
- Kaure, a village in Ngamiland East, Botswana

== See also ==
- Kauri (disambiguation)
- Koure (disambiguation)
