= Kauri (disambiguation) =

Kauri is a type of tree.

Kauri may also refer to:

- Kauri, New Zealand, a locality in Northland, New Zealand
- Kauri language, a variety of Jingpho
- Hans Kauri, Estonian biologist and politician

== See also ==
- Kauri-butanol value
- Kauri gum
- Kaure (disambiguation)
- Kouri (disambiguation)
- Kaori, a Japanese given name
- Kawri, a village in Syria
