= Koury =

Koury may refer to:

== Companies ==
- Koury Corporation, company of North Carolina

== People ==
- Allan Koury, Canadian politician
- Frederick J. Koury, founder of City-as-School high school
- Frederick Thomas Koury, American wrestler known as Fred Curry
- Karyn Khoury, American perfumer
- Maurice J. Koury, textile entrepreneur founder of Carolina Hosiery
- Rex Koury, music theme composer of TV show Gunsmoke
- Sadie Koury, founder of Sadie's restaurant chain

== Places ==
- Koury, Mali

== See also ==
- Khoury, a surname
- Coury, a surname
- Kouri (disambiguation)
