= Koure =

Koure may refer to:

- Koure, Guinea, a small town on the outskirts of Conakry
- Kouré, Niger, a rural community noted for its giraffe population
- Gouré, Chad, a community near lake Iro

== See also ==
- Kouri (disambiguation)
- Kaure (disambiguation)
