= Chao Chak =

- Village
- Location within Punjab
- Coordinates: 31.676°N 75.402°E
- Country: India
- State: Punjab
- District: Gurdaspur
- Tehsil: Batala
- Region: Majha

Government
  - Type: Panchayat raj
  - Body: Gram panchayat

Population (2011)
  - Total: 477
  - Total Households: 89
- Sex ratio 233/244 ♂/♀

Languages
  - Official: Punjabi
- Time zone: UTC+5:30 (IST)
- Telephone: 01871
- ISO 3166 code: IN-PB
- Vehicle registration: PB-18
- Website: gurdaspur.nic.in

Chao Chak is a village in Batala in Gurdaspur district of Punjab State, India. The village is administrated by Sarpanch an elected representative of the village. It is located approximately 0.65 km (0.4 mi) from the nearest village, Kaure.

== Demography ==
As of 2011, the village has a total number of 89 houses and a population of 477 of which 233 are males while 244 are females according to the report published by Census India in 2011. The literacy rate of the village is 84.58%, highest than the state average of 75.84%. The population of children under the age of 6 years is 68 which is 14.26% of total population of the village, and child sex ratio is approximately 1125 higher than the state average of 846.

== See also ==
- List of villages in India
