= Murder of Eric Richins =

2022 murder in Utah, U.S.

- Location: Kamas, Utah, United States
- Date: March 4, 2022; 4 years ago 3:21 AM (911 call); 4:58 AM (death pronouncement)
- Attack type: Murder by poisoning, mariticide
- Weapon: Fentanyl
- Victim: Eric Richins
- Perpetrator: Kouri Richins
- Motive: Financial gain; Resentment; Infidelity
- Verdict: Guilty on all counts
- Convictions: Aggravated murder; Attempted aggravated murder; Insurance fraud (2 counts); Forgery
- Sentence: Life imprisonment without the possibility of parole

On March 4, 2022, Eric Eugene Richins, a 39‑year‑old American man living in Utah, died from a lethal dose of illicit fentanyl. On May 8, 2023, his wife, Kouri Darden Richins was charged with his murder; financial charges were added in June 2025, and the murder charges were amended in October 2025. Kouri stood trial for the murder in March 2026. She was convicted by the jury on all counts on March 16.

In 2023, Summit County prosecutors did not seek the death penalty against Kouri Richins: this decision was made in careful consultation with Eric Richins’ father and his two sisters (Katie and Amy).

The case received widespread national and international media attention due to the circumstances surrounding the murder and the subsequent publication of the children's grief book Are You with Me?, attributed to Kouri after Richins' death. The case has been referred to as the "grief author murder trial".

On May 13, 2026, Kouri was sentenced to life in prison without the possibility of parole.

== Background ==
Eric Eugene Richins was born on May 13, 1982, in Bountiful, Utah, to Linda and Gene Richins. He was the oldest of three children and had two younger sisters: Katie Richins (born in 1984), who was 38 years old at the time of her brother's death in March 2022, and Amy Richins, the younger sister (born in 1986) - who was approximately 35 years old at the time. The Richins family lived their entire upbringing on a cattle ranch. Eric was athletic and took part in basketball, baseball, and soccer. He was also an experienced hunter and outdoorsman. He and Kouri Darden met while she was working as a cashier at Home Depot. The couple married in the backyard of their home in Francis on June 15, 2013, and later moved to Kamas, Utah. They had three sons.

Richins owned a successful contracting business, and Kouri worked as a real estate agent who bought and renovated homes.

== Case ==
On March 4, 2022, Kouri called authorities to report that Richins was unconscious at their home. According to her initial statement, the couple had been celebrating the closing of a real estate sale for Kouri, and she had made him a Moscow Mule before going to bed.

A subsequent autopsy revealed that Richins died of a fentanyl overdose. Blood levels of the substance were five times higher than a lethal dose and had been ingested orally.

Before her arrest in May 2023, and while the investigation was ongoing, Kouri published a children's book titled Are You With Me? in March 2023, dedicated to her three children to help them cope with the loss of their father. The book stated that it brought peace and comfort to children who had lost a loved one and centered on a child wondering if their father was present during special occasions such as birthdays, Christmas, and the first day of school. In promoting the book, she appeared on television programs as an example of overcoming grief, a point the prosecution later described as a façade to hide the crime. Text messages shown in court later indicated that the book had been authored by a ghostwriter who had been paid by Kouri.

Kouri, a real estate agent, was deeply in debt and planning her future with another man, Josh Grossman. Prosecutors said she had taken out numerous life insurance policies for her husband without his knowledge, which could have brought her benefits totaling about $2 million. In addition, her phone's Internet search history included queries such as "what is a lethal dose of fentanyl" and "luxury prisons for the wealthy in the United States," according to a digital forensics analyst.

== Aftermath ==
Prosecutor Brad Bloodworth played a clip of Kouri's 911 call from the night Richins died, saying it was "not the sound of a wife becoming a widow," citing the defense's opening statement. Bloodworth said it was "the sound of a wife becoming a black widow." Defense attorney Wendy Lewis said the prosecution "looked at the facts in a way that you want to see a witch, but if you look at them another way, you see a widow." The defense argued that Richins was addicted to painkillers and had asked his wife to buy him opioids. Kouri, 35, was ultimately convicted on March 18, 2026, of aggravated murder. She was also convicted of other crimes, including attempted murder, as she had tried to poison her husband weeks earlier, on Valentine's Day, with a fentanyl sandwich that rendered him unconscious. The jury also found her guilty of forgery and fraudulently claiming insurance benefits after his death.

The trial formally began in 2026, and the prosecution presented a financial motive based on Richins' accumulated debt (more than $2 million) and her interest in collecting on her husband's life insurance policies.

Key evidence accepted by the court included:

- Acquisition of substances: Testimony from a supplier who confirmed that he had sold fentanyl pills to the defendant weeks before Richins death.
- Background: Richins had told family and friends that he feared that his wife was trying to poison him after he had become seriously ill on two previous occasions.
- Forged documents: Evidence that the defendant had attempted to change the beneficiaries of Richins's will without his knowledge.

On March 16, 2026, the jury returned a guilty verdict on all major charges, including first-degree murder. Richins family reacted with relief, declaring that "the truth had come out".

On May 13, 2026, Kouri was sentenced to life imprisonment without the possibility of parole.

On September 24, 2026, Wasatch County Sheriff Jared Rigby and former Summit County Sheriff Dave Edmunds were charged with obstruction of justice in connection to the investigation into Kouri.
