= Kouri, Gnagna =

Kouri Kauri
- Interactive map of Kouri
- Country: Burkina Faso
- Region: Est Region
- Province: Gnagna Province
- Department: Piéla Department

Population (2019)
  - Total: 3,069

Kouri is a town in the Piéla Department of Gnagna Province in eastern Burkina Faso.

Population
Year	Pop.	±%
1985	1,292	—
2006	2,949	+128.3%
2019	3,069	+4.1%
