= Coury =

Coury/Courey are surnames. Notable people with the surnames include:

Coury

- Al Coury (1934–2013), vice-president of American record label Capitol Records
- Anny Buchstab Coury (1929–2026), Ukrainian-born American petroleum geologist
- Dick Coury (1929–2020), American football coach
- Fred Coury (born 1967), American musician
- Gabriel Coury (1896–1956), British Army officer and Victoria Cross recipient
- Steve Coury (born 1957), American football player and coach
- Tino Coury (born 1988), American singer, songwriter, producer

Courey

- Mike Courey (1959–2007), American football player
