= Kaure, Gurdaspur =

Coordinates: 31°40′N 75°24′E

Kaure
- Village
- Interactive map of Kaure
- Country: India
- State: Punjab
- District: Gurdaspur
- Tehsil: Batala
- Region: Majha

Government
  - Type: Panchayat raj
  - Body: Gram panchayat

Area
  - Total: 197 ha (490 acres)

Population (2011)
  - Total: 725; 381/344 ♂/♀
  - Scheduled Castes: 390; 205/185 ♂/♀
  - Total Households: 141

Languages
  - Official: Punjabi
- Time zone: UTC+5:30 (IST)
- Telephone: 01871
- ISO 3166 code: IN-PB
- Vehicle registration: PB-18
- Website: gurdaspur.nic.in

Kaure is a village in Batala in Gurdaspur district of Punjab State, India. It is located 0.65 km (0.4 mi) from the nearest village, Chao Chak, 29 kilometres (18 mi) from sub district headquarter, 50 kilometres (31 mi) from district headquarter and 9 kilometres (5.6 mi) from Sri Hargobindpur.The village is administrated by Sarpanch an elected representative of the village.

== Demography ==
As of 2011, the village has a total number of 141 houses and a population of 725 of which 381 are males while 344 are females. According to the report published by Census India in 2011, out of the total population of the village 390 people are from Schedule Caste and the village does not have any Schedule Tribe population so far.

== See also ==
- List of villages in India
