= Koure, Guinea =

Koure Kouré
- Location in Guinea
- Coordinates: 09°37′10″N 13°36′33″W
- Country: Guinea
- Region: Capital Region (Guinea)
- Elevation: 240 ft (73 m)
- Time zone: UTC0
  - Summer (DST): UTC0

Kouré is a small town on the outskirts of Conakry, and within the administrative remit of the capital city of Guinea, the Capital Region (Capitale d'Etat-Zone Speciale de Conakry or CEZSC).

Two other smaller towns in Guinea share this name: Koure, near the border of Mali north of the Niger River headwaters in the Kankan Region, and Koure in the Lola Prefecture of the Nzérékoré Region of Guinea's far east, along the border with Liberia. This last village, in an area inhabited by the Kapele people, has recently gained attention as the birthplace of the Guinean army officer, Moussa Dadis Camara, who as of December 31, 2008 was the acting president of the country.
