= Political violence in the 2024 United States presidential election =

Several incidents of political violence occurred before, during, and after the 2024 United States presidential election. The years surrounding the 2016, 2020, and 2024 elections have seen political violence as the United States has entered an era of political violence unseen since the Civil Rights Era or the Antebellum period due to the rise of extremist groups such as the Proud Boys and Oath Keepers. Many political and anthropological experts such as Barbara F. Walter and Neil Howe have hypothesized that the United States is nearing a second civil war or era of political violence unseen in American history since the 1860s.

== Background ==
Several scholars, lawmakers, intelligence agencies, and the members of the public have expressed concerns about political violence surrounding the 2024 election. The fears come amidst increasing threats and acts of physical violence targeting public officials and election workers at all levels of government.

Since the 2020 election and continuing into the 2024 election, the election denial movement in the United States has prompted thousands of death threats directed at election workers, officials, and their families, with some receiving letters laced with fentanyl. Threats have led some election workers to resign and have affected recruitment of temporary poll workers. Efforts to protect election workers are diverse, including active shooter drills, provision of trauma kits and Narcan, and the use of bullet-proof vests, bullet-resistant glass, metal detectors, various kinds of barriers, armed guards, police snipers, drones, and security cameras. However, many boards of election lack the funds for such efforts.

In October 2024, Reuters reported that they had identified at least 300 cases of political violence since the January 6 U.S. Capitol attack by Trump supporters, with 51 cases identified between January and October 2024. The pace of incidents have risen since Trump first took office in 2016, with 93 cases reported at its peak in 2020. An August poll by the SNF Agora Institute at Johns Hopkins University indicated that respondents expected "a lot" or " a great deal" of political violence after the election. An October AP-NORC poll found that 27% of Republicans and 42% of voters overall were either extremely or very worried about post election violence. In a NPR/PBS News/Marist poll released on November 4, 72% of likely voters reported being concerned about violence as a result of the election.

Trump has been identified as a key figure in increasing political violence in America both for and against him. Political violence is at its highest since the 1970s, and most recent violence has come from right-wing assailants. Trump has increasingly embraced far-right extremism, conspiracy theories such as Q-Anon, and far-right militia movements to a greater extent than any modern American president. Trump has espoused dehumanizing, combative, and violent rhetoric and promised retribution against his political enemies. (Note: Attributed to multiple references:) Trump has played down but refused to rule out violence following the 2024 election, stating "it depends". Trump has suggested using the military against "the enemy from within" on Election Day that he described as "radical left lunatics", Democratic politicians, and those who oppose his candidacy.

Other political leaders in the United States have also used violent or extremist rhetoric, such as Ohio Republican George Lang who said it may take a civil war to "save America" if Trump loses the election. Following the January 6 United States Capitol attack, 2016 presidential candidate Hillary Clinton called for the "formal deprogramming" of MAGA's "cult members".

== Preparation against ==
In the days before the election, the states of Washington, Oregon, and Nevada put their National Guard troops on standby as a precaution for potential election unrest. In Washington DC, Metropolitan Police Chief Pamela Smith reported that the police will be working 12-hour shifts and depending on events the potential to have longer shifts so that there would be officers throughout the city. Additional fencing was erected around the White House and the Naval Observatory, which contains the Vice Presidents residence, and other businesses in the area had boarded up windows.

== Political violence ==
=== Assassination attempts on Trump ===
On July 13, 2024, Trump survived an assassination attempt while addressing a campaign rally near Butler, Pennsylvania. Trump was shot and wounded on his right ear by Thomas Matthew Crooks, a 20-year-old man from Bethel Park, Pennsylvania, who fired eight rounds with an AR-15–style rifle from the roof of a building located approximately 400 feet (120 meters) from the stage; the shots killed audience member Corey Comperatore and critically injured two other audience members. Seconds later, Crooks was shot and killed by the U.S. Secret Service's counter-sniper team. The motive and cause of the assassination attempt are still under investigation by authorities. On September 11, 2024, a bipartisan Senate report identified tech issues and other preventable mistakes by the Secret Service during the event. On September 15, 2024, Trump survived a separate assassination attempt at Trump International Golf Club in West Palm Beach, Florida. The suspect did not fire his weapon, and no deaths or injuries were reported. The suspect, Ryan Routh, is in custody. In August, a Pakistani national was arrested for allegedly plotting to assassinate Trump.

=== Ballot attacks ===
Locations of ballot drop box arson attacks in October 2024

In October 2024, a series of arson incidents targeted ballot drop boxes across the United States during the election. Fires set in ballot drop boxes have occurred in Washington, Oregon, and Arizona, resulting in damage to hundreds of ballots. Ballot drop boxes are widely used in the United States for mail-in voting, particularly in states with established vote-by-mail systems such as Washington and Oregon. In 2024, the US Department of Homeland Security (DHS) warned that ballot drop boxes were at risk, identifying them as "soft targets" for potential interference. These attacks emerged days before the election, intensifying concerns over voter access and the security of election systems.

==== Washington and Oregon ====
On October 28, 2024, an incendiary device was placed inside a ballot drop box near the Multnomah County Elections Division office in Portland, Oregon. The fire suppression system prevented major damage, although three ballots were affected. Security was subsequently increased around ballot boxes in Multnomah County.

On the same day, a fire broke out inside a ballot drop box at Fisher's Landing Transit Center in Vancouver, Washington, damaging hundreds of ballots. Firefighters quickly contained the flames, but officials from Clark County advised any voter who submitted ballots after 11 a.m. the day prior to request a replacement ballot. In response, additional security measures were put in place, including increased surveillance and monitoring.

Security footage suggested a possible link between the Portland and Vancouver incidents, showing a similar vehicle at both scenes. The attacks took place less than an hour apart from each other, and occurred less than two weeks before the 2024 United States presidential election. A prior arson attack from October 8, 2024, against a separate Vancouver ballot box, in which no ballots were damaged, was also linked to the October 28 attacks. Prior to the fires, the FBI and the Department of Homeland Security had issued a bulletin raising concerns about "election-related grievances" could motivate domestic extremist activity and that ballot drop boxes could be seen as "attractive targets".

==== Arizona ====
In Phoenix, Arizona, a fire was started in a mail collection box, destroying some ballots and other mail. A suspect was arrested and claimed that he was trying to be arrested and that the fire was unrelated to the election. Arizona Secretary of State Adrian Fontes assured affected voters that they would receive replacement ballots.

==== Response and impact ====
Local and state officials, including Washington Secretary of State Steve Hobbs and Oregon Governor Tina Kotek, denounced these arson attacks as direct threats to democratic processes. Election offices in affected areas responded by implementing enhanced security measures, including 24-hour monitoring of ballot drop boxes, to ensure the safety and accessibility of the voting process. These incidents underscored a broader national concern over election security amid heightened political tensions. U.S. Representative Marie Gluesenkamp Perez and Joe Kent, opposing candidates for Washington's 3rd congressional district, both condemned the arson attacks. Shasti Conrad, chair of the Washington State Democratic Party, said the attacks represented an attempt at voter disfranchisement.

==== Investigation ====
The Federal Bureau of Investigation (FBI), along with state and local law enforcement agencies, is actively investigating these incidents. Authorities in Arizona have identified a suspect, while the cases in Washington and Oregon are still under investigation, with efforts to determine potential connections between the incidents. Security measures continue to be reinforced as investigations proceed. The Portland Police Bureau (PPB) and Vancouver Police Department used materials from the incendiary devices attached to the ballot boxes to draw a connection between the Portland and Vancouver attacks. Authorities also found a link between the October 28 incendiary devices and an incendiary device from a separate Vancouver ballot box attack on October 8. A bomb squad removed the October 8 device with no damage to the ballots. In a joint statement, the FBI and district attorney Tessa M. Gorman announced an investigation into the three fires.

The suspect in the Portland and Vancouver attacks was described by the PPB as a white male between 30 and 40 years old, "highly knowledgeable in metal fabrication and welding", with a medium to thin build. Investigators also sought information on a black or dark-colored Volvo S60 with no front license plate, and released two images of the vehicle in question. Police cautioned that the perpetrator likely intended to continue the attacks. The New York Times reported that two law enforcement officials, speaking on the condition of anonymity, claimed the words "Free Gaza" were marked on the October 28 incendiary devices, and "Free Palestine" on the October 8 incendiary device. It was unclear to investigators whether the writings reflected the views of an actual pro-Palestine activist or someone trying to "sow discord" in the United States.

=== Campaign headquarters and workers violence ===
Between September and October, the Democratic Party's campaign office in Tempe, Arizona, was hit by gunfire. The office was shut down on October 6, after the third shooting. After looking for campaign materials for Trump at a tent at a VFW in St Clair Shores staffed by the St Clair Shores Democratic Club, the 55-year-old man reportedly yelled derogatory and anti-LGBTQ slurs and insults at the group. Before leaving he claimed that Trump would win and that he would "exterminate" people like them before entering his vehicle and accelerating towards them. He was later arrested and charged with three counts of assault with a deadly weapon and three counts of ethnic intimidation.

=== Threats and suspicious packages ===
As of March 2024, the Department of Justice's Election Threats Task Force had charged 20 people with threat-related crimes. In September 2024, suspicious packages were sent to state election officials in Iowa, Kansas, Oklahoma, Massachusetts, Missouri, Nebraska, Tennessee, and Wyoming. This resulted in evacuations in several states. The inclusion of white powder in most of the packages mirrored the 2001 anthrax attacks, but the substance in the Oklahoma delivery was identified as flour.

On November 3, a man was arrested after threatening to shoot people at a polling location in Rochester, Minnesota after an election judge at the location reported hearing him state that he would "shoot all the Democrats in the building" when he and another man enter the building to vote. When officers attempted to investigate the incident at the mans home, the man was reportedly belligerent and repeatedly screamed at the officer he was going to kill him.

On November 5, bomb threats that were later identified as Russian originated hoaxes were email to polling locations in the five battle ground states of Georgia, Michigan, Arizona, Wisconsin and Pennsylvania. At least two polling locations in Georgia were briefly evacuated, and Pennsylvania extended their voting hours, while it did not disrupt voting in other locations. The Russian embassy claimed that the allegations of Russian interference were "malicious slander". NBC News analysis found the bomb threats overwhelmingly targeted Democratic-leaning cities and counties.

Also on November 5, New York State Police responded to a polling location in Fowler after a convicted felon attempted to vote and was rejected from the polling site, as he had not re-registered since being released from prison according to their records. After being rejected, the man became irate and made multiple threatening remarks such as that he would burn the place down and that he was going to return with a gun, before fleeing the scene. Officers later arrested the 69-year-old man and he was charged with making a terroristic threat.

=== Violence leading up to Election Day ===
In late January, a fire was investigated by the ATF as a premeditated attack of arson targeting an office that held Conservative Think Tanks. Conservative researcher John Hinderaker who worked at the office labeled the attack as a coordinated firebombing by leftists.

On January 30 in Pennsylvania, Justin Mohn, who espoused right-wing political beliefs, including anti-immigration, anti-LGBTQ, and advocacy for small-government, shot and beheaded his father, a federal employee. Justin brandished his father's head in a YouTube video, which was quickly removed from the platform. In the video, he engaged in an anti-Left and anti-government political tangent. Mohn was later found wandering on a nearby military base. Prior to the attack, Mohn created music and attempted to establish an anti-government civilian militia, which failed.

On February 24, 2024, a man planted and detonated an improvised explosive device outside of an Attorney General's office in Montgomery, Alabama. The man, 26-year-old Benjamin Douglas Calvert, also placed antifascist, anti-police, and anti-ICE stickers on state government buildings. No buildings were damaged and no casualties were reported. Calvert was sentenced to 20 years in prison without possibility of parole.

An alleged arson attack occurred at Bernie Sanders' Vermont campaign office in the first week of April, which damaged the interior of the building. The suspect was seen near the office prior to the attack and had been arrested years earlier after illegally transporting an AK-47.

In early April, a Trump supporter in New Jersey known for brandishing pro-Trump slogans was attacked by a man with a sledgehammer and was critically injured. The victim was later transported to a nearby hospital via Medevac. The attack occurred in an auto-body shop in Middletown on Route 36. Police say the attack may not have been politically motivated.

In early May, an anarchist group named Rachel Corrie's Ghost Brigade claimed responsibility for an arson attack, where at least 15 police cars in Northeastern Portland were destroyed. Other Portland anarchists claimed responsibility for torching a car belonging to Portland City Commissioner Rene Gonzales' family member in an act of intimidation.

On July 2, in Pasquotank County, North Carolina, three black male teenagers were playing in a front yard when a truck carrying four white males all wearing ski masks approached them and asked if they supported Trump. When they responded "no", the occupants of the truck pulled out BB guns and shot them several times, striking at least two of them and breaking windows in the house behind them.

In July, an 80-year-old man in Hancock, Michigan, was hospitalized after being run over while planting a Trump sign in his yard. The suspect called police confessing to the attack, and when police arrived was found dead in his home to a self-inflicted gunshot. In two other earlier incidents in the area, vehicles owned by supporters of candidate Donald Trump were vandalized.

In September, a man in Farmington Hills, Michigan, pulled a knife on a black female postal carrier after becoming upset over a Kamala Harris mailer while verbally assaulting the worker and Harris, calling the worker a "black nigger" and that he did not want a "black nigger in my mailbox". The man was later arrested and federally charged as the postal worker was a federal employee.

On October 3, a fight erupted at a Trump rally between 3 people in Saginaw, Michigan.

In mid-October, a man working for Donald Trump's campaign in South Boston, Massachusetts, was allegedly mobbed by a group of teens for holding a pro-Trump flag, posting a photo of himself in a neck brace after the attack. The teens, who claimed the man attacked them first, retreated after a bystander used pepper spray to deter them.

On October 29, Republican candidate for Washington State House of Representatives, Riaz Khan, was attacked by a man with a hammer while putting up a campaign sign in Mukilteo, Washington. The suspect reportedly shouted Islamophobic and anti-Trump messages during the attack, in which Khan sustained bruising on his back.

On November 2, a 60-year-old man named Robert Yott in Bath, New York, attacked a man in a supermarket wearing a "Trump 2024" cap. Yott punched the man in the mouth and head, breaking several teeth. Yott did not know the victim prior to the attack, and was charged with a felony assault and criminal mischief.

=== Violence against voters, poll workers, and at political events ===
In September, an elderly Harris supporter at a rally was allegedly grabbed by his neck and thrown to the ground before being repeatedly punched by another in York City. The attacker also yelled racial slurs and was later arrested, after rally goers were able to subdue him.

On October 30, a supporter of Donald Trump in Neptune Beach, Florida, was arrested after brandishing a machete in front of two supporters of Kamala Harris at an early voting location.

During early voting in San Antonio, Texas, a voter was arrested and charged for allegedly assaulting an elderly poll worker. The worker reportedly asked the man multiple times to remove his MAGA hat at the polling location. In Texas, it is illegal to wear any clothing showing support of political candidates while in a polling location.

On November 1, 2024, a voter wearing a "Let's Go Brandon" hat was reportedly struck by a poll worker after a verbal altercation over his hat at an Orangeburg County, South Carolina polling location. It is illegal to wear anything supporting a candidate whose name is on the ballot, but wearing a general political message is permitted by South Carolina law.

At a homeless shelter in North Dakota on November 1, a man stabbed another man twice, once in the lungs during a heated argument. The assailant said he felt pressured by provocative comments in late October from President Biden and Vice President Harris that labeled "them [Trump supporters]" as garbage. The suspect also stated "we are at war" after the attack.

On November 2, a 17-year-old male was arrested in Stuart, Florida after he allegedly punched a 70-year-old woman in the stomach at a rally for Kamala Harris.

On November 3, a 24-year-old man went on a profanity filled tirade and assaulted a 74-year-old election judge at a Orland Park voting location, after being asked to not cut in line and wait his turn, the man also struck an 81-year-old woman.

On November 4, an 82-year-old woman wearing a Harris pin was arrested on suspicion of a hate crime after allegedly assaulting a 55-year-old multi-racial Trump supporter in Edmonds, Washington.

Additional security was placed around some ballot drop off locations in Washington DC during election day, after private security alerted the Metropolitan Police Department about an unidentified individual purposefully dumping screws and nails on the road by polling places and ballot drop off locations.

=== Violence during and after Election Day ===
On November 5, a woman in Seattle killed her father in a meltdown on election night, although prior to election results being announced. She attacked and killed her father with an ice climbing axe, and smashed all the windows in the home. The attack was the culmination of an argument over lighting in the house, and was likely not related to the election.

On November 7, a man in Minnesota known for his anti-Trump stances murdered four of his family members: two adults and two children, before committing suicide. Prior to the attack, he stated he would shoot or want his family members killed if Trump won the election. The attacker held anti-Trump, anti-religious, and anti-misogynistic views.

On November 6, in Miami, a mass shooting occurred at a party, resulting from an argument over the election results. The shooter, Brianna Sands, who was likely intoxicated, opened fire on the partygoers. Three people in total were injured, one critically. While the shooter's political affiliation was unclear, the shooting was reported as a political attack.

On December 18, Pacific Islander American KJCT reporter Ja-Ronn Alex was driving to the station's office in Grand Junction when he noticed a taxicab following him. In the parking lot, a man exited the taxi and assaulted him, putting Alex in a chokehold before other employees pulled him away. According to witnesses, the suspect yelled, "This is Trump's America now! I'm a Marine and I took an oath to protect this country from people like you." He was arrested and booked on multiple charges, including bias crimes.

On December 18, in Berwyn, Illinois, a man was shot and killed by police after attempting to assassinate far-right political activist Nick Fuentes during a late-night podcast he was conducting. The assassin killed three others in the prelude to the attack, which was not politically motivated. Before the attack, Nick Fuentes was doxed over controversial misogynistic comments he made on X, responding to anti-Trump remarks following the election. The attacker approached Fuentes' home, shouting for him while wielding a pistol and crossbow, and began patrolling the exterior of the home according to surveillance video provided by Fuentes on X. In an earlier incident regarding the same comments, a feminist activist recording at Fuentes' home was pepper sprayed, resulting in Fuentes being arrested and criminally charged. Criminal charges were then dropped for a civil suit in April 2026.
