= Kowri =

Kowri Kowrī
- Location in Afghanistan
- Coordinates: 36°33′30″N 70°17′3″E
- Country: Afghanistan
- Province: Badakhshan Province
- District: Tagab
- Time zone: + 4.30

Kowri is a village in Badakhshan Province in north-eastern Afghanistan.
