= Kouri, Bazèga =

Kouri Koury
- Location in Burkina Faso
- Coordinates: 12°2′45″N 1°31′19″W
- Country: Burkina Faso
- Region: Centre-Sud Region
- Province: Bazèga Province
- Department: Saponé Department

Population (2019)
  - Total: 822

Kouri is a village in the Saponé Department of Bazèga Province in central Burkina Faso.

Population
Year	Pop.	±%
1985	793	—
2006	883	+11.3%
2019	822	−6.9%
