= Murder in Utah law =

Murder in Utah law constitutes the unlawful and intentional killing, under circumstances defined by law, of people within or under the jurisdiction of the U.S. state of Utah. Utah law categorizes homicide offenses into various kinds with specific criteria, each carrying specific penalties.

== Legal definitions and classifications ==
Under Utah law, homicide offenses are classified as follows:

- Murder: Intentionally or knowingly causing the death of another person. This is classified as a first-degree felony.
- Aggravated Murder: Involves intentional killing under specific aggravating circumstances, such as the murder of a law enforcement officer, multiple victims, or during the commission of certain felonies. Aggravated murder is a capital felony.
- Manslaughter: Recklessly causing the death of another person or committing murder under mitigating circumstances, such as extreme emotional disturbance. This is a second-degree felony.
- Negligent homicide: Causing the death of another person through criminal negligence. This is classified as a class A misdemeanor.

In the 2013 case of State v. Perea, the Utah Supreme Court ruled that the U.S. Supreme Court decision in Graham v. Florida, which prohibits life without parole sentences for juveniles in non-homicide cases, does not apply to individuals aged 19 or older or to homicide cases.

== Penalties ==
Offense	Mandatory sentencing (Parole Eligibility Determined by Parole Board)
Murder or felony murder	15 years to life
Aggravated murder	Death penalty, life without parole, or 25 years to life
Manslaughter	1 to 15 years imprisonment
Negligent homicide	Up to 1 year in jail

== Statistics ==
The United States Centers for Disease Control and Prevention reported in 2020 that Utah had one of the lowest homicide rates in the United States. Despite this, the Utah Department of Public Safety recorded a 44% increase in homicides in 2020 compared to 2019, with a total of 93 homicides reported. By 2023, Utah's violent crime rate had decreased to 232 per 100,000 residents, down from the 2020 spike.

== See also ==
- Criminal law of the United States
- Capital punishment in Utah
