= Reprisals against commentators on the Charlie Kirk assassination =

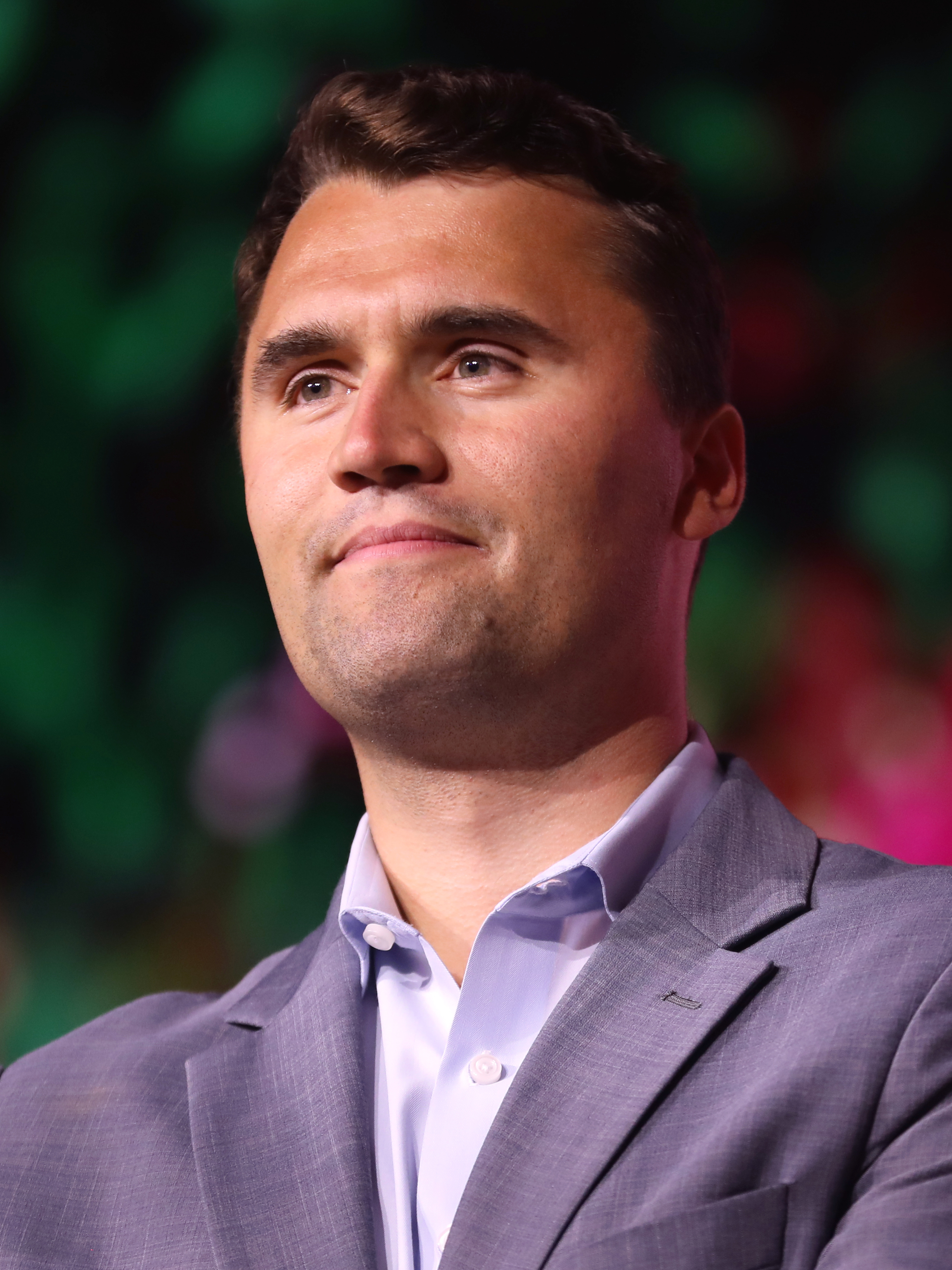
Charlie Kirk (here in June 2024) was assassinated on September 10, 2025, while speaking at Utah Valley University.

After the assassination of American political activist and commentator Charlie Kirk in September 2025, there followed widespread disciplinary and retaliatory actions against people seen as celebrating, justifying, or trivializing Kirk's death, encouraging further political violence, denigrating Kirk, or tarnishing his legacy. These efforts were promoted and directly facilitated by the U.S. federal government: in the immediate aftermath of the assassination, President Donald Trump explicitly condemned "the left" for violence, and pledged to target left-wing groups and causes, monitor political speech, revoke visas, and designate Antifa and groups that might support it as domestic terrorists.

On the night of Kirk's killing, the Department of State announced it would penalize foreigners considered to be "praising, rationalizing, or making light of Kirk's death". Secretary of Defense Pete Hegseth announced an investigation into the reactions of members of the U.S. Armed Forces, as well as subsequent firings and dismissals of those found to have made obscene or blasphemous comments about Kirk. Commentary cited as reasons for firings and other reprisals included comments which openly celebrated Kirk's demise, spoke critically of his politics or political influence, or quoted his words in ways intended to dishonor his memory. In some cases, even criticizing the Republican Party's response to his killing could result in termination of employment or other disciplinary actions.

Following Kirk's death, a number of prominent conservatives called for retaliation against or punishment of private citizens and government or military employees whose comments about Kirk were, in their view, likely to encourage additional political violence, or which were deemed insufficiently respectful towards Kirk and his legacy. They also called for investigations into left-wing groups, universities, and the military for putative anti-Kirk speech. On The Charlie Kirk Show following his death, Vice President JD Vance called for Kirk's followers to report people who made disparaging remarks about Kirk to their employers, with the goal of getting them fired. Trump later announced that any network that criticized him too harshly could be subject to a revocation of their broadcast license. Multiple analysts have regarded these efforts by the political right as a significant crackdown on political speech and dissent in the United States, and an effort to silence criticism of Kirk and the conservative political ideology he promoted. Critics of the Trump administration have labeled its response as a form of cancel culture and censorship, and some have compared it to McCarthyism.

Altogether, over 600 Americans were known to be punished in some way over their comments about Kirk. Roughly one year onward, employers and other organizations had paid out $2 million in legal settlements to people who were fired or otherwise punished in the reprisals.

== Background ==
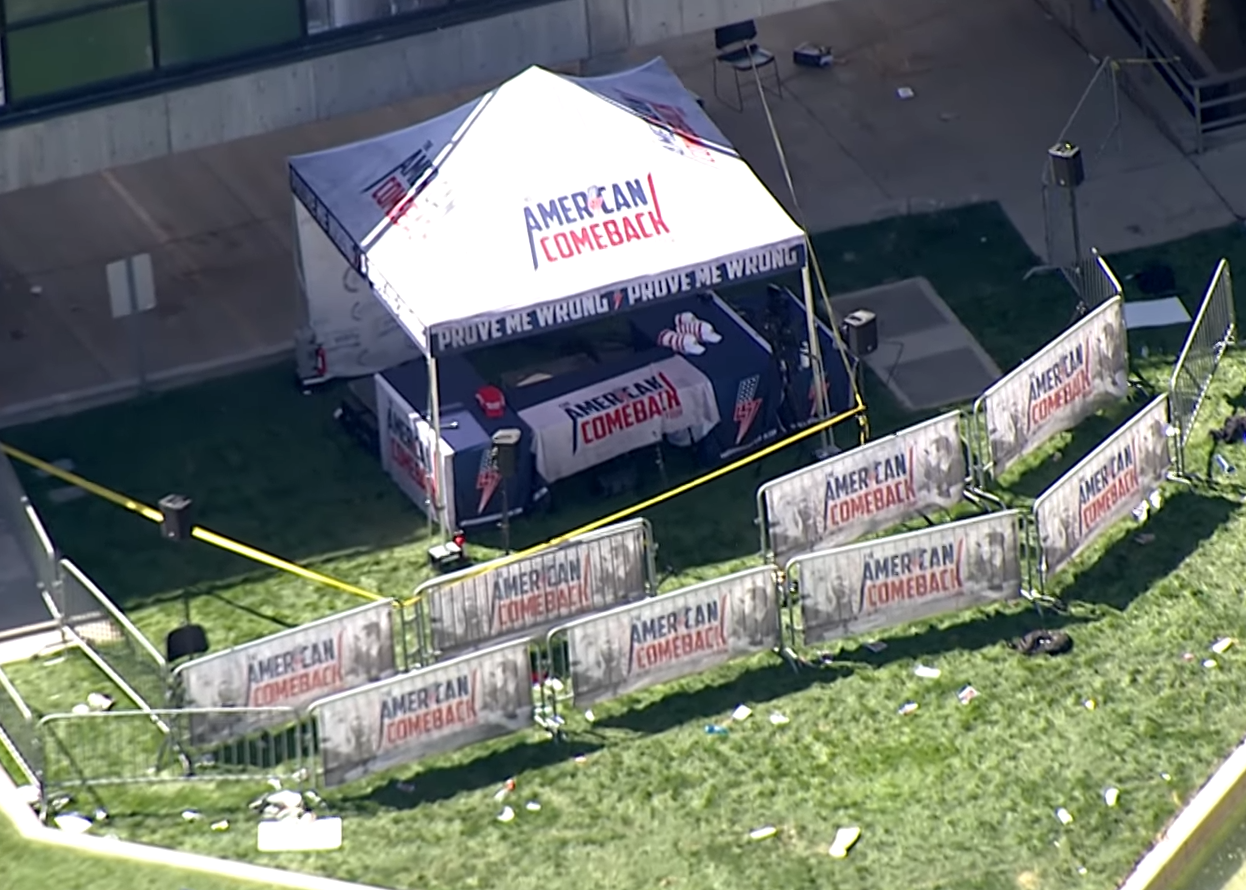
The tent in which Kirk was fatally shot, cordoned off with police tape

Charlie Kirk was an American right-wing influencer who founded Turning Point USA and hosted The Charlie Kirk Show. He was known for his debates on college campuses where he attempted to promote his conservative views to young audiences. His statements about topics such as LGBTQ+ individuals, the role of women in marriage, and race in the United States were controversial. At a campaign event in Kentucky with Nate Morris in June 2025, Kirk himself spoke about the potential for violence. He told the crowd: "We're on the front lines where it's not always safe."

On September 10, 2025, Kirk was engaged in one of his regular debates as part of his American Comeback Tour with college students at Utah Valley University—debating mass shootings in the United States committed by transgender individuals—when a gunman on a nearby rooftop shot and killed him. Reactions on social media varied. The vast majority of people on both sides of the political aisle condemned the murder; some who opposed Kirk's views celebrated, justified, or mocked his death. After the shooting, some users on Bluesky made posts glorifying or celebrating Kirk's killing—which in extreme cases incited further violence against other right-wing figures, several posting or reposting a meme that said "do Trump next" or "Elon next please". This prompted the platform to issue a statement denouncing such posts. Other social media platforms including Meta, YouTube, and Reddit issued similar warnings to their users.

== Initial reactions by the Trump administration ==
Speaking to the nation during the aftermath of Kirk's death, President Donald Trump, while calling for nonviolence and lamenting "the demonization of those with whom we disagree", blamed "a radical left group of lunatics" for the killing; Trump said that leftist political rhetoric and activism was terrorism and hate speech responsible for Kirk's death, and stated that he would "get that problem solved". He subsequently announced that people and groups "on the left" would be investigated for alleged responsibility for political violence and would face retaliatory action. Critics said that Trump was exaggerating the prevalence of left-wing political violence and downplaying a rise in violence on the right, citing statistics showing that cumulatively since 1975, more extremist killings in the U.S. have been caused by right-wing perpetrators than left-wing perpetrators. From 2022 through 2024, all 61 political killings were committed by right-wing extremists.

In an interview on September 13, Trump reiterated his intent to crack down on speech and activism by left-wing and progressive groups, calling for prominent Democratic Party donor George Soros to be jailed, accusing Soros as well as other left-wing political figures and organizations of effectively funding Kirk's murder via support for "violent protest". The groups Trump had explicitly accused of funding and fomenting violence, such as the Open Society Foundation and Indivisible, condemned the killing prior to Trump's remarks and denied ever supporting or funding violent protest. After Jimmy Kimmel's show was indefinitely suspended a few days later when Kimmel opined on air that "the MAGA gang [is] desperately trying to characterize this kid who murdered Charlie Kirk as anything other than one of them and doing everything they can to score political points from it", Trump stated that broadcasters who criticized him too strongly could risk being subject to loss of licensure.

Hosting Kirk's podcast after his death, JD Vance called for the dismantling of progressive political organizations, including Soros's Open Society Foundation, and told Americans to report "uncivil" speech about Kirk to employers and relevant authorities, demanding that individuals who engaged in inappropriate speech about Kirk be terminated. Thousands were flagged by vigilante online conservative groups for allegedly celebrating Kirk's death, often incorrectly and without evidence. Secretary of State Marco Rubio announced that any non-citizens who celebrated Kirk's death would be immediately deported, and Secretary of Defense Pete Hegseth instructed staff to identify and purge any members of the military service or his department who condoned or mocked Kirk's death.

Deputy Chief of Staff Stephen Miller immediately blamed the left for Kirk's murder, writing that left-wing ideology was a "twisted, depraved ... ideology at war with family and nature ... that leads, always, inevitably and willfully, to violence", and accused the left of "celebrating". Miller later claimed on Kirk's podcast with Vance that, on the day before his death, "the last message that Charlie sent me ... was that we needed to have an organized strategy to go after the left-leaning organizations that are promoting violence in this country." Miller alleged that "a vast terrorist network" on the left was responsible for the murder, and declared that the administration would "destroy" progressive political organizations in response, in Kirk's name. Miller said the federal government would devote every resource at its disposal to vengeance against left-wing non-profit and political non-governmental organizations and networks and would "identify, disrupt, dismantle and destroy these networks". Attorney General Pam Bondi indicated on Katie Miller's podcast and in subsequent Department of Justice announcements that she intended to "target" speech against Kirk following his death as hate speech, which led to a backlash within a section of the right.

On September 22, Trump signed an executive order intended to designate antifa as a domestic terrorist organization, and to "investigate, disrupt, and dismantle" individuals and groups associated with, or providing material support, to antifa, raising concerns that it could be used as a pretext to target political opponents. As with his previous attempt in 2020, legal experts said that there is no precedent for labeling a domestic group as a terrorist organization under U.S. law.

== Doxxing ==
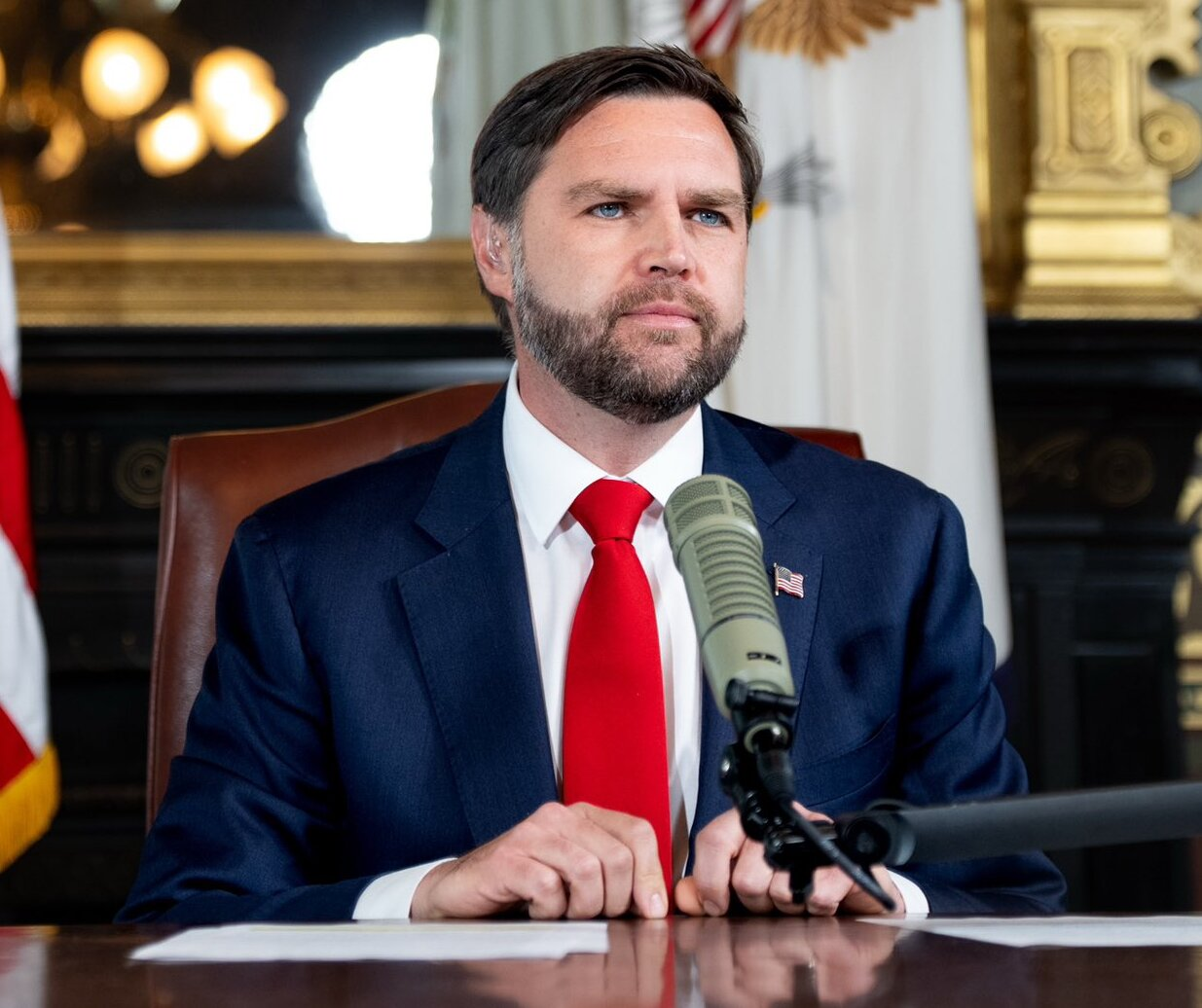
Vice President JD Vance hosting Kirk's podcast

Far-right activists such as Laura Loomer sought to identify social media users who were posting offensive or celebratory content about Kirk's death. Reuters reported that some right-wing influencers who encouraged reporting social media posts had previously mocked political violence; Reuters cited comments from a number of right-wing activists, including Kirk, about past events including the attack on Paul Pelosi. On September 11, in response to the previous day's "horrific assassination", Deputy Secretary of State Christopher Landau invited his social-media followers to report any foreign-born U.S. residents who "glorify violence and hatred" to the Department of State in order to protect the American people. On September 15, Vance guest hosted Kirk's podcast and told listeners that if they saw anyone who was reportedly celebrating Kirk's death to "call them out" and continued stating: "Hell, call their employer. We don't believe in political violence, but we do believe in civility, and there is no civility in the celebration of political assassination."

An organization initially named Expose Charlie's Murderers (later rebranded to the Charlie Kirk Data Foundation) reportedly collected more than 63,000 submissions of public comments about Kirk. The website, hosted under the web platform Epik, was removed on September 16 after violating its Terms of Service. According to Epik, the domain was registered using false information, and they had received credible DDoS threats. Three days after the shooting, the site had accumulated 30,000 submissions; cybersecurity experts characterized the site as a means to coordinate harassment, and as an echo of Turning Point USA's Professor Watchlist. Vance and Republican members of Congress have called for the government to start investigating progressive organizations following Kirk's assassination, and those targeted have compared the firings to those of McCarthyism in the 1950s, when suspected communists were targeted and ostracized from American society.

Due to many unverified accusations, uninvolved individuals with similar names were publicly identified and harassed: a man with the same name of an online poster received threatening messages and phone calls and was suspended from his job, and his family left their home out of safety concerns. In another case, the Students for Trump national chair Ryan Fournier had to retract an accusation against a teacher in Wisconsin, although Fournier asked for doxing and accusations to continue with more evidence. Additionally, the school's principal reached out to Fournier, who did not respond; Fournier ultimately took two days to retract the post, and after he did, he issued an apology that the school's principal called "half-assed".

== Employee terminations and investigations ==
=== United States ===
In the days after the shooting, various people – including teachers, firefighters, and members of the military and U.S. Secret Service – were fired from their jobs for social media posts that celebrated Kirk's assassination or were seen as disparaging of his legacy. Vice President JD Vance called for a crackdown on liberal political groups and an investigation into "uncivil" speech critical of Kirk or disrespectful of his memory or legacy. These calls to use Kirk's death to "justify measures to silence opponents" and crack down on political speech have been echoed by President Trump and other leading Republican officials. Secretary of Defense Pete Hegseth also called for a purge of the military and broad investigation into members found to be critical of Kirk in the wake of his death.

According to a November 2025 Reuters investigation, over 600 Americans were fired from their jobs over comments made about the assassination. The number was likely an undercount, since many terminations would not have been publicly disclosed.

==== Education ====
According to a list compiled by The Chronicle of Higher Education, at least 40 higher education faculty, staff, and students have been terminated, suspended, or expelled for commentary alleged as insufficiently respectful towards Kirk following his death. Several faced consequences for suggesting Kirk's shooting was ironic, in light of his views on gun violence in the United States. A faculty member at Austin Peay State University was terminated for sharing a screenshot on Facebook of a Newsweek headline in which Kirk said that deaths from guns were "unfortunately" worth it in order to preserve the Second Amendment. The university's statement claimed that the post warranted termination because reposting Kirk's own prior remarks justifying gun violence implicitly justified his death. In January 2026, the faculty member was reinstated and awarded $500,000 as part of a settlement. Another staff member at the University of Louisville was placed under investigation for re-posting "without comment" Kirk's remarks on gun deaths being the price of the 2nd amendment.

A South Dakota faculty member was suspended for posting "I don't give a flying f—k about this Kirk person. Apparently he was a hate-spreading Nazi. ... I'm sorry for his family ... But geez, where was all this concern when the politicians in Minnesota were shot? And the school shootings? And Capital [sic] Police?"

An instructor at Enterprise State Community College, Alabama, was terminated for calling attention to the Evergreen High School shooting that happened on the day of Kirk's killing, posting on TikTok, "Let us not forget some other children were shot in another f—king shooting today." Some faculty were terminated for making jokes about the incident, such as an instructor from Guilford Technical Community College who was videotaped by a student while joking that "I'll praise the shooter; he had good aim". Many more educators across the U.S. have been placed on indefinite leave due to negative or unsympathetic comments made about Kirk online.

Middle Tennessee State University fired Assistant Dean of Students Laura Sosh-Lightsy for "inappropriate and callous" social media remarks about Kirk's murder. The University of Mississippi fired Lauren Stokes, an executive assistant to a vice chancellor, after she shared a post critical of Kirk following his assassination. Clemson University terminated an employee and later dismissed two faculty members for "inappropriate" social media posts about Kirk's assassination (initially removing the professors from teaching before firing them). In Chula Vista, a teacher was placed on leave after showing the video to students. Ohio State University professors described a "sense of unease" following firings, expressing concerns over speculation about being recorded by students seeking to catch them expressing negative views about Kirk.

Two school districts in Texas have fired two teachers and placed a third on administrative leave for making comments online about Kirk's death. Both districts said the comments of the fired employees did not reflect the values of their schools. According to Texas governor Greg Abbott, nearly 300 teachers in the state are under investigation for speech criticizing Kirk. A student at Texas Tech University was recorded arguing with another student holding a "RIP Charlie Kirk" sign stating at one point "Yeah, fuck your homie dead" and appearing to touch the MAGA hat the student was wearing. She was later expelled from the university and arrested on misdemeanor assault with Governor Abbott and the Texas Tech Board of Regents Chairman condemning her behavior. A student at Texas State University was expelled for mocking Kirk's death, with a video showing him saying, "Charlie Kirk got hit in the neck, bitch", and mimicking Kirk's death by slapping himself in the neck.

On October 2, 2025, the Rutgers University chapter of Turning Point USA launched a petition against Rutgers professor Mark Bray, calling for the university to fire him. The petition referred to him as "Dr. Antifa" and called him an "outspoken, well-known antifa member". Members of the chapter also called him "a financier of Antifa". Bray responded saying: "I've never been part of an antifa group, and I'm not currently. There's an effort underway to paint me as someone who is doing the things that I've researched, but that couldn't be further from the truth." The petition was posted after the assassination, when Jack Posobiec referred to him as a "domestic terrorist professor" on X. After Fox News publicized the petition, Bray received death threats and his home address was made public, and he and his wife, who also teaches at Rutgers, decided to flee with their two young children to Spain where Rutgers had said they could continue to teach remotely. Their first attempt to fly to Spain was blocked after they went through security at the airport because someone cancelled their reservation, but they succeeded the next day. The Rutgers chapter denied supporting doxxing or harassment.

A professor at Emory University was fired after she posted "good riddance" in response to the assassination. Georgia Representative Buddy Carter had called for her termination from the university after seeing her Facebook posts, and threatened to cancel federal grants to Emory University. The University Senate's Committee for Open Expression denounced the termination, characterizing it as "the sort of viewpoint discrimination that the [university's] Open Expression Policy expressly rejects."

==== Entertainment ====
DC Comics cancelled Gretchen Felker-Martin's Red Hood book series one day after its debut, after the writer commented about Kirk's death on Bluesky, saying "Hope the bullet's OK after hitting Kirk", later deleting the post and "Thoughts and prayers you Nazi bitch". In an interview with The Comics Journal, Felker-Martin stated that when DC called to inform her that this was "something that DC and Warner Brothers couldn't stand behind or defend", she stood by her comments, stating, "I said that I've listened to Charlie Kirk being an overt Nazi for years of my life, and I had no regrets for what I said about him."

PHNX Sports parted ways with Phoenix Suns beat writer Gerald Bourguet over his social media posts about Kirk's death. The Carolina Panthers fired football communications coordinator Charlie Rock after an Instagram story that referenced Kirk's death; the team said it "does not condone violence of any kind". Drew Harrison, a Sucker Punch Productions developer who worked on Ghost of Yōtei and worked for ten years on PlayStation Studios, was fired after sharing on social media that "I hope the shooter's name is Mario so that Luigi knows his bro got his back" — referencing the Mario franchise while associating Kirk's then unidentified killer with Luigi Mangione. In response, Sony Interactive Entertainment stated that Harrison was "no longer an employee of Sucker Punch Productions".

===== Jimmy Kimmel Live! suspension =====
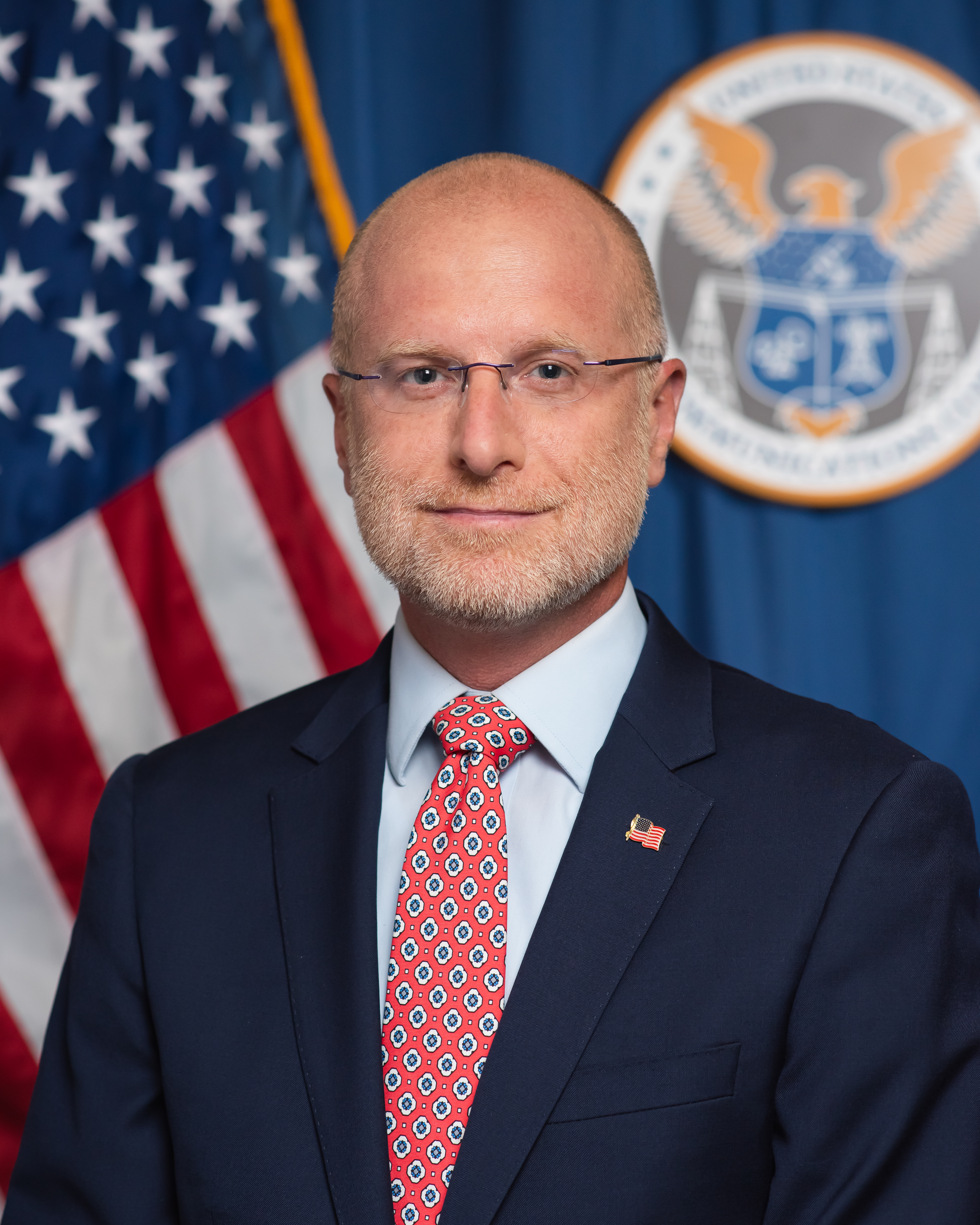
After FCC Chair Brendan Carr warned that ABC's broadcast license could be revoked, the network placed Jimmy Kimmel Live! on suspension.

ABC suspended production of Jimmy Kimmel Live! following remarks made during host Jimmy Kimmel's September 15 broadcast, in which Kimmel said, "The MAGA gang [is] desperately trying to characterize this kid who murdered Charlie Kirk as anything other than one of them and doing everything they can to score political points from it." The suspension followed a suggestion by Trump-appointed Federal Communications Commission (FCC) Chair Brendan Carr that the FCC may revoke ABC affiliates' broadcasting licenses as punishment for Kimmel's remarks and came shortly after Nexstar Media Group and Sinclair Broadcast Group announced that they would pull the show from its ABC-affiliated stations. Kimmel intended to address his comments on the show prior to the suspension.

Jonathan Yerushalmy and Edward Helmore for The Guardian reported that "politicians, media figures and free speech organizations continued to express anger and alarm at the suspension of Jimmy Kimmel's late-night show", highlighting shared concerns that "critics of Donald Trump were being systematically silenced". Trump afterwards suggested that the FCC could revoke licenses if they aired predominantly negative coverage of Trump himself.

Celebrities who refused to work with Disney over the firing included Tatiana Maslany, Damon Lindelof and Frances Fisher. Calls to boycott Hulu and Disney+ circulated across social media. The American Civil Liberties Union called the move "beyond McCarthyism", and the Writers Guild of America and SAG-AFTRA called it an infringement of constitutional rights. FCC Commissioner Anna M. Gomez, the lone Democrat on the board, said in a statement, "This FCC does not have the authority, the ability, or the constitutional right to police content or punish broadcasters for speech the government dislikes."

The suspension was lifted and Kimmel returned to the show on September 23, where he thanked people who supported him and said, "[I]t was never my intention to make light of the murder of a young man. I don't think there's anything funny about it."

==== Press ====
Media analyst Matthew Dowd was fired by MSNBC after he appraised Kirk as "one of the most divisive, especially divisive younger figures in this, who is constantly sort of pushing this sort of hate speech or sort of aimed at certain groups. And I always go back to, hateful thoughts lead to hateful words, which then lead to hateful actions." A reporter in Florida was suspended for texting Congressional Representative Randy Fine immediately after the shooting to ask if it would prompt him to rethink his opposition to gun control.

Karen Attiah was fired from The Washington Post in the aftermath of the shooting. Attiah criticized what she saw as a double standard in the way Kirk's killing was being treated in the media compared to the assassination of Minnesota lawmakers earlier in the year. Attiah was, in turn, the subject of online criticism for misquoting Kirk's comments from July 13, 2023, when she wrote that he had said: "Black women do not have the brain processing power to be taken seriously. You have to go steal a white person's slot." Kirk had actually said in the video:

If we would have said three weeks ago [...] that Joy Reid and Michelle Obama and Sheila Jackson Lee and Ketanji Brown Jackson were affirmative-action picks, we would have been called racist. But now they're comin' out and they're saying it for us! They're comin' out and they're saying, "I'm only here because of affirmative action."

Yeah, we know. You do not have the brain processing power to otherwise be taken really seriously. You had to go steal a white person's slot to go be taken somewhat seriously.

The New York Times noted that "Her post incorrectly said that Mr. Kirk had referred to all Black women." She corrected herself in a Bluesky post days later. Attiah called her firing "part of a broader purge of Black voices from academia, business, government, and media", saying also: "As a columnist, I used my voice to defend freedom and democracy, challenge power and reflect on culture and politics with honesty and conviction. Now, I am the one being silenced – for doing my job." An arbitrator ordered her rehired the following year.

==== Other sectors ====
Private companies such as Freddy's Frozen Custard & Steakburgers have terminated employees for posts deemed inappropriate, and major U.S. airlines American Airlines, Delta Air Lines, and United Airlines have all suspended employees for similar reasons. Nasdaq terminated a junior sustainability strategist for social media posts about Kirk. A Texas Roadhouse employee was fired over his wife's social media comments calling Kirk a "Nazi" and expressing outrage at a perceived undue level of sympathy toward him compared to the victims of school shootings. A Las Vegas radio producer was fired for his posts taking issue with condolences expressed toward Kirk and his family.

Law firm Perkins Coie fired a lawyer "effective immediately" over a post criticizing Kirk after his killing, saying the conduct fell "far short" of firm expectations. The Broad Institute said an employee who posted a "deeply offensive" message about Kirk's assassination "is no longer employed" at the institute. REMSA Health, an EMS provider, fired an employee over a social media post about Kirk that said did not reflect its mission. Office Depot dismissed an employee after a viral video showed staff refusing to print a poster for a Kirk vigil, calling it "propaganda", and Attorney General Pam Bondi threatened to prosecute the fired employee.

=== International ===
==== Australia ====
A South Australian police sergeant is being investigated by the organization's disciplinary unit under the "Police Complaints and Discipline Act 2016" for posts made on social media about the assassination of Charlie Kirk. South Australian Commissioner Grant Stevens confirmed the probe into the Facebook post and stated that the police officer was under investigation, but not suspended.

==== Brazil ====
Vogue Brasil stylist Zazá Pecego was fired on September 13 after sharing the phrase "I love when fascists die in agony" on her social media. She later said the phrase was meant to refer to former Brazilian president Jair Bolsonaro being convicted in the criminal case AP 2668 for the 2022 Brazilian coup plot, rather than refer to Kirk. On the same day, physician Ricardo Barbosa was fired from a clinic in Recife after praising Kirk's shooter's "impeccable aim". Journalist Eduardo Bueno had speeches, participation in events, and a podcast cancelled after praising that Kirk's children would "grow up without the presence of a disgusting, scoundrel, racist, homophobic person, linked to pedophile Donald Trump". Bueno later apologized for the statement, claiming to be the target of an "orchestrated movement by far-right lawmakers"; he nevertheless once again reinforced his disdain for conservative leaders such as Trump, Marco Rubio, and Kirk himself, arguing the world without Kirk's presence "is a place that becomes better". On September 20, São Paulo mayor Ricardo Nunes of the Brazilian Democratic Movement announced that he had initiated the termination process for Sustenidos, the social organization responsible for managing the Municipal Theater Complex since 2021. The termination of the contract came after an employee made a social media post criticizing Kirk.

==== Canada ====
A religious studies and political science professor from the University of Toronto was placed on leave after she made a comment on Twitter: "shooting is honestly too good for so many of you fascist cunts". The university sent an email stating: "The faculty member is now on leave and not on campus. The matter is being looked into and the university will not be commenting further." A Toronto District School Board teacher was also temporarily suspended after showing a video of Kirk's assassination to grade 5 and 6 students.

University of Alberta professor Florence Ashley was put on a week-long, non-disciplinary administrative suspension – without their prior knowledge or consent – for commenting on Bluesky, in reaction to an Ezra Klein headline in The New York Times: "You do not, in fact, ever have to hand it to the Nazis. I utterly do not care for any 'virtues' that someone may perceive in them."

==== Mexico ====
Salvador Ramírez, a congressional staffer from Mexico's ruling National Regeneration Movement (Morena), resigned after comments he made about Kirk having been given "a taste of his own medicine" (Spanish: una cucharada de su propio chocolate) on a Milenio Televisión discussion panel were brought to the attention of U.S. Deputy Secretary of State Christopher Landau. Landau, who served as the U.S. ambassador to Mexico from 2019 to 2021, responded on X (formerly Twitter) with a reminder of the State Department's authority to revoke visas; he also rebuked the broadcaster, which subsequently issued an apology.

==== Netherlands ====
At a performance in Amsterdam on September 13, the front man of English punk duo Bob Vylan said: "Cause if you chat shit you will get banged. Rest in peace Charlie Kirk, you piece of shit." Their subsequent performance in Tilburg on September 16 was cancelled by the promoter.

==== United Kingdom ====
The Oxford Union, a debating society, forwarded evidence for disciplinary proceedings against its president-elect George Abaraonye, who had debated Kirk earlier in the year, after he posted comments appearing to celebrate Kirk's assassination. The Oxford Union condemned both Abaraonye's remarks, and the subsequent racist harassment and threats he received when they were made public. University College, Oxford ultimately determined that the remarks "do not contravene the college’s policies on free speech, or any other relevant policy" and declined to discipline Abaraonye. Fiona Wild, an independent member of Burnley Borough Council, resigned on September 11 following a post in which she said "good riddance" and that Kirk had "brought this on himself".

== Criminal sanctions, immigration consequences, and legal remedies ==
An estimated 600 people were penalized or terminated from their place of work as punishment for their public opinions on Kirk's death, resulting in employers and institutions paying out about $2 million in legal settlements in response to lawsuits from such individuals as of 2026. The Foundation for Individual Rights and Expression counted at least 14 federal lawsuits alleging first amendment violations, which does not include lawsuits in state courts or lawsuits over corporate firings.

The Trump administration revoked the visas of six people who made derisive comments about Kirk.

On September 21, 2025, a retired police officer in Lexington, Tennessee, was arrested and charged with making threats of mass violence after he posted a meme in a Facebook group planning to hold a vigil for Kirk. The meme consisted of an image of President Trump saying "We have to get over it", attributed to "Donald Trump on the Perry High School mass shooting one day after." The meme referenced a shooting that occurred at Perry High School in Perry, Iowa in 2024, and a quote of what Trump had said shortly after. The meme was captioned with "This seems relevant today", and The Tennessean found it had been posted multiple times by social media users since 2024. Sheriff Nick Weems justified the man's arrest, saying the meme "led teachers, parents and students to conclude he was talking about a hypothetical shooting at our school", referring to Perry County High School in nearby Perry County. Weems later acknowledged that he knew the reference to Perry High School in the meme referred to the mass shooting in Iowa, and The Intercept found no sign that teachers and parents reacted the way Weems described. The man's bond was set at $2 million. A hearing on a motion to reduce bail was reset at the prosecutors' request. Charges were dropped against the man in late October; in all, he spent 37 days in jail. In December 2025, the man sued the county and sheriff, alleging violation of his First and Fourth Amendment rights. In May 2026, Tennessee officials agreed to pay the man $835,000 to settle the lawsuit.

A biologist formerly employed by the Florida Fish and Wildlife Conservation Commission eventually received a $485,000 settlement after the Commission fired her for sharing a meme premised on the notion that Kirk did not care about schoolchildren being shot. A public defender in Iowa received a $125,000 compensation from the state, after she was fired in September 2025 for statements that she had made on her personal Facebook page including "live by the sword, die by the sword," and "you reap what you sow." The defender had appealed her termination and was reinstated by the Department of Inspection, Appeals, and Licensing, who disagreed with the Public Defender office claim that her comments were not protected by free speech. The former Ball State University director of health promotion and advocacy settled with the Indiana university for $225,000 after she sued the university following her post criticizing Kirk after his death, where she stated it was a tragedy but that she could not be friends with people who thought Kirk was a good person.

In January 2026, the American Federation of Teachers filed suit against the Texas Education Agency over its leadership in asking superintendents to report teachers for any potential "inappropriate content" they may have shared about Kirk. Prior to the case, the federation reportedly had collected 354 complaints and were still actively investigating 95. A professor at Austin Peay State University was fired after posting the headline of a 2023 news article stating, "Charlie Kirk Says Gun Deaths 'Unfortunately' Worth it to Keep 2nd Amendment" before being reinstated a few months later and receiving a $500,000 settlement.

== Reactions ==
=== Media ===
The Associated Press described the campaign as having "broadened to include even those whose statements were critical of Kirk without celebrating his assassination". Adam Goldstein of the Foundation for Individual Rights and Expression described the shift as a form of right-wing cancel culture, noting that people were being targeted for simply quoting Kirk or failing to mourn his passing adequately. Goldstein said that "government involvement in this does inch this closer to looking like McCarthyism".

In The New York Times, Adam B. Kushner reported the firings as part of a crackdown on free speech in the United States and investigative journalist Kenneth P. Vogel discussed "the emerging White House plan to use the federal government to crack down on the left-wing groups that it believes inspire political violence". The New York Times also described the campaign as morphing into "a conservative version of the cancel culture that only a few years ago was wielded by the American left", and evidence of the rise of a "woke right". Axios described the firings as companies "reacting to pressure from Republican officials and right-wing activists and quickly firing anyone who attempts to justify or minimize the assassination of Charlie Kirk — or even criticize the slain conservative activist." Axios said these firings "demonstrate fast-changing norms around free speech that many find troubling", indicating that employers are more closely monitoring their employees' social media posts.

Telegraph Online echoed these criticisms, saying that while criticism of Kirk is not formally illegal, "what has emerged is a de facto enforcement system, carried out through corporate policies, viral tip-offs, and political pressure", also citing the chilling effect. It suggested that this was less about stopping violence than about policing speech and added: "If meaningful free expression is to endure, society must scrutinize these cases, question who is punished and why, and revisit what protections workers really have. Otherwise, public discourse around volatile figures will become a minefield, where even legitimate criticism carries the risk of career destruction." During Trump's state visit to the United Kingdom on September 16–18, 2025, The Independent accused Trump and his administration of hypocrisy, alleging they pushed for and celebrated the firing and targeting of those that they felt were celebrating Kirk's death, while Trump spoke about the virtues of free speech during his speech at Windsor Castle during a state dinner.

In December 2025, Trump was further accused of hypocrisy after mocking the killing of Rob and Michele Reiner, suggesting that Rob Reiner's death was caused by anger toward his "Trump derangement syndrome", whereas Reiner had condemned Kirk's assassination. In March 2026, Trump was further accused of hypocrisy after celebrating the death of Robert Mueller, a former director of the Federal Bureau of Investigation, writing in a Truth Social post: "Good, I'm glad he's dead. He can no longer hurt innocent people!"

=== Conservative ===
Some right-wing media figures and former members of the administration, such as Alex Jones, Jesse Watters, Elon Musk, and Steve Bannon, stated that Kirk's killing meant that Americans were "in a war" between right and left. Some others on the right, including conservatives who had derided the practice as cancel culture, demanded "retribution" and "vengeance" against the left for speech claimed to have contributed to and celebrated Kirk's death, endorsing speech crackdowns, and retaliation. Musk claimed that "the left is the party of murder" and repeatedly exhorted his followers to "fight"; Musk also sought personally to have individuals deplatformed, imprisoned, or retaliated against for negative commentary about Kirk despite his claim to be a "free speech absolutist" who acquired Twitter to oppose efforts to deplatform individuals in retaliation for unpopular speech, attempting to publicly exert pressure via the social network on Microsoft CEO Satya Nadella to retaliate against employees of its affiliate Blizzard whom Musk alleged had made inappropriate comments about Kirk, and similarly seeking to influence Amazon CEO Jeff Bezos to retaliate against leftist Twitch streamer Hasan Piker for making comments about the shooting with which Musk apparently disagreed. The allegations that Piker or Blizzard employees had celebrated Kirk's death have not been subsequently verified.

Some right-wing officials and members of the media, such as FCC chairman Brendan Carr and conservative podcaster and former Fox News host Tucker Carlson, opposed some of the efforts to limit free speech or criticism in the wake of Kirk's death, particularly efforts to classify speech as hate speech which celebrates Kirk's death or punish free expression online, viewing these as unconstitutional and potentially dangerous crackdown on civil liberties or basic freedoms. Carlson spoke out against the firings on The Tucker Carlson Show, stating that the Trump administration was using Kirk's death to trample on the First Amendment. He warned that if Kirk's death is used as leverage to bring hate speech laws into the United States, it would cause havoc and be a justified moment for civil disobedience.

=== Legal ===
Under case law in the United States, such as Pickering v. Board of Education (1968), it was established that public employees including teachers have the right to free speech on matters of public concern without termination, excluding any statements that are "knowingly" or "recklessly false". Other cases such as Garcetti v. Ceballos (2006) affirm that First Amendment protections are not given for any public employee comments made as representatives for their agencies, and Tinker v. Des Moines Independent Community School District (1969) restricts the protections if the actions or speech would interfere or disrupt the school's operation or infringe on others rights.

In the United States, several of educators and faculty members were fired over comments made about Kirk and his death. Many have filed federal lawsuits indicating that their terminations were unconstitutional and violations of the First Amendment. In South Carolina, a teachers aide filed a federal lawsuit after being allegedly fired over a Facebook post using Kirk's own words and her reaction to it while off-duty. The aide alleged in the suit that the termination violated U.S. and South Carolina's constitutions as did the social media guidelines of her district. A professor at Ball State University who was fired over a private Facebook post filed a lawsuit via the ACLU of Indiana, indicating that her opinion is fully protected under the First Amendment. On September 25, it was reported that a professor at the University of South Dakota was reinstated after being fired for a private Facebook post where he called Kirk "a hate spreading Nazi".

=== Academic ===
Historians Wendy Goldman and Timothy Snyder compared the events to the Great Purge in the Soviet Union of the 1930s, when an assassination prompted Joseph Stalin to proclaim vast non-existent conspiracies; to redefine dissent as terrorism and treason; to encourage people to inform on dissenters; and to engage in a campaign of prosecution, imprisonment, and extrajudicial execution of hundreds of thousands of political opponents.
