= James Allsup =

American white supremacist (born 1995)

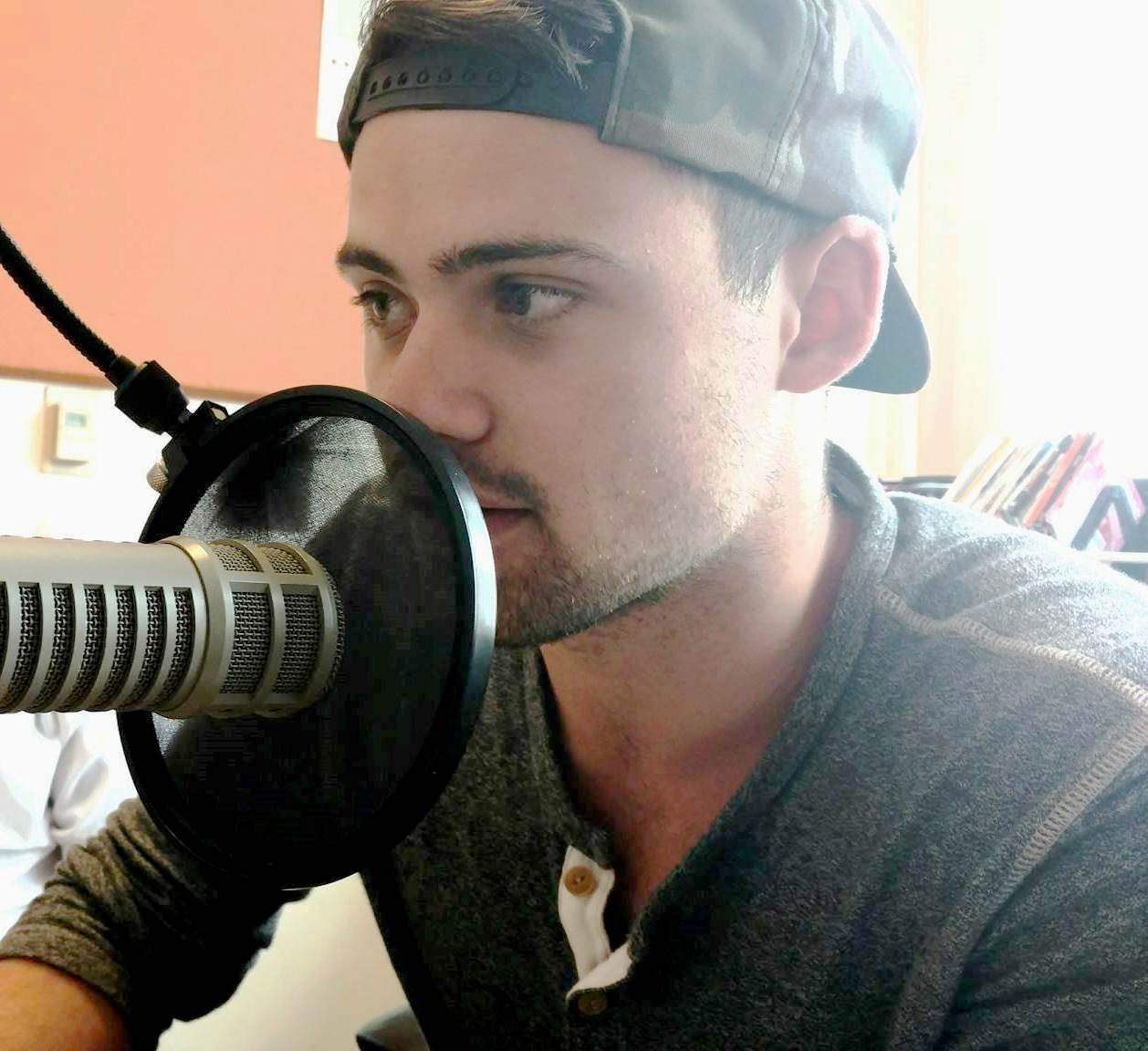
- Allsup in July 2016
- Born: James Orien Allsup; September 7, 1995 (age 30); Beaverton, Oregon, U.S.
- Education: Bothell High School; Washington State University
- Occupations: Activist, podcaster
- Known for: YouTube, Unite the Right rally
- Political party: Republican

YouTube information
- Channel: James Allsup
- Years active: 2015-2019
- Subscribers: 452 thousand
- Views: 74 million
- Last updated: August 26, 2019

James Orien Allsup (born September 7, 1995) is an American white supremacist, neo-Nazi, and former political commentator and podcaster.

In 2015, Allsup began his participation in politics when he was elected president of Washington State University's chapter of the College Republicans. In August 2017, Allsup attended the white supremacist Unite the Right rally in Charlottesville, Virginia. After the rally turned violent, he resigned as president of the College Republicans at WSU in 2017, before being re-elected later in November of the same year. He was unable to take the position per university rules as he was set to graduate. He was a member of the American Identity Movement, a white nationalist, Identitarian, and neo-Nazi organization, until it disbanded in 2020. In August 2019, Allsup's Instagram and Facebook accounts were deleted. According to Facebook, this was "for violating our policies against dangerous organizations and individuals". His YouTube channel was also demonetized around this time. Several days later, the channel was one of several which were deleted from YouTube by Google as part of a policy shift to remove content affiliated with white supremacy. At the time it was deleted, the channel had more than 450,000 subscribers. After previously claiming to not be a white supremacist, fascist, or neo-Nazi, in September 2019 Allsup co-hosted a podcast on the neo-Nazi network The Right Stuff.

In June 2018, he ran unopposed and was elected as a Precinct Committee Officer for Precinct 129 of the Whitman County, Washington Republican Party. On January 7, 2019, the Whitman County Republican Central Committee voted unanimously to eject Allsup from the party, to not recognize his vote on the committee, and to withdraw his voting seat.

== Early life and education ==
Allsup was born in Beaverton, Oregon on September 7, 1995. He graduated from Bothell High School in 2014, and then enrolled at Washington State University (WSU) in Pullman, Washington, graduating in 2017. While attending WSU, he was president of WSU College Republicans and hosted events that brought Republican candidates such as Bill Bryant and Chris Vance to the university.

== Activities ==
=== President of the WSU's College Republicans ===
Allsup was elected president of the WSU's College Republicans chapter in 2015, and remained president until resigning on August 14, 2017. According to one student who attended meetings of the organisation, Allsup changed the nature of the group dramatically.

In January 2017, Allsup arranged for Milo Yiannopoulos to speak at WSU; the event was cancelled due to weather. The president of the WSU Young Democrats, Gavin Pielow, continued to host a "Civics 101" program that had been planned as an "alternative event" to Yiannopolous' planned visit.

As president of the College Republicans, Allsup consistently participated in public forum debates with his counterpart, Pielow. In the spring of 2017, ASWSU senator Kevin Schilling moderated a debate between Allsup and Pielow in which the two discussed Russia's involvement in President Donald Trump's administration, Supreme Court confirmations, U.S. foreign policy, the proposed border wall between the U.S. and Mexico, the national budget, and health care.

In 2016, Allsup served as the Washington coordinator for Students for Rand, the youth division of Rand Paul's presidential campaign.

=== Students for Trump ===
Following the suspension of Paul's campaign, Allsup was hired by Ryan Fournier to serve as the Senior Advisor at Students for Trump, a non-profit political organization based in Campbell, North Carolina supporting Donald Trump's presidential campaign, unaffiliated with the official campaign organization.

Allsup helped to organize the May 9, 2016 construction of the "Trump Wall" at the University of Washington. The wall was 10 by 8 ft (3.0 by 2.4 m) and built out of plywood, painted to resemble a brick wall, with the phrases "Blue Lives Matter" and "Make America Great Again" painted on the front. The event, which was co-hosted by UW Students for Trump and UW College Republicans, was met with "about 100" protesters. Allsup stated that the intended message of the event was "that we need to have a strong immigration policy and enforce the law," and regarding the exposure the event generated, that "the reason people demonstrate is for exposure, media or otherwise."

In January 2017, he attended an inauguration celebration outside the National Press Club in downtown Washington, D.C., where he stated he had been attacked by a protester with a flagpole.

=== Unite the Right rally and aftermath ===
Allsup attended the Unite the Right rally in Charlottesville on August 12, 2017. At the rally, he documented events and delivered a speech defending the protesters there. Allsup was open about his participation in the rally, including his plan to speak, which was disrupted by protesters. On the Monday after the rally, he resigned from his position as head of the College Republicans group at WSU, a move he said he had been planned in advance but had subsequently expedited. In an interview with KREM, he said that he attended the rally "in a media capacity" and was unexpectedly asked to speak by one of its organizers. He also said that he disagreed with the violence that occurred there and with the hateful symbols, such as swastikas, that were being displayed by some of the rally's attendees. After attending the rally in Charlottesville, it was reported by unnamed sources that he uploaded a video documenting his experiences there that was almost immediately taken down.

Images of Allsup attending the rally posted on social media led to demands on social media platforms that WSU expel Allsup, including a petition. Allsup stated on Twitter that if college administrators did expel him, it would result in a "huge civil rights lawsuit win for me." As of the week of August 14, he was not enrolled in classes for the fall semester at WSU.

=== Election to local Republican Party position ===
In an uncontested election in June 2018, Allsup was elected to be the Precinct Committee Officer (PCO) for Precinct #129, a minor "hyperlocal" position of the Washington State Republican Party. PCOs elect the Republican leadership in their respective counties. Allsup was unopposed for the position and the party rules state that an unopposed candidate automatically wins. His election was criticized by many Republican leaders in Whitman County.

According to the Southern Poverty Law Center, which monitors hate groups, Allsup's intentions have been to achieve his white nationalist anti-immigration agenda "through the infiltration of the Republican Party rather than by the radical, revolutionary action favored by vanguardist groups on the extreme fringe." Allsup told a white nationalist podcast in 2017 "You have a seat at the table, and that’s the most important thing, getting that seat at the table, and you can get that seat at the table by, yes, showing up, yes, by bringing people in." Keegan Hankes, a senior research analyst at the SPLC, commented that "Anytime that someone who holds extreme political positions has any foothold in mainstream politics, it’s a problem," and pointed out that using uncontested elections to get a foot in the door has long been a strategy for white nationalists.

On January 7, 2019, the Whitman County Republican Party Central Committee voted unanimously to eject Allsup from the party ranks. The committee voted to withdraw Allsup's voting seat and to not recognize his vote on the committee. Several party officials, including County Commissioners Art Swannack and Michael Largent, commented that Allsup was hardly a Republican. They pointed to the fact that Allsup himself has denied being a Republican.

=== Social media ===
Allsup's account on Twitter was suspended in December 2017. At the time he had amassed about 24,000 followers.

In August 2019, Allsup's Instagram and Facebook accounts were deleted. According to Facebook, this was "for violating our policies against dangerous organizations and individuals". His YouTube channel was also demonetized around this time. Several days later, the channel was one of several which were deleted from YouTube by Google as part of a policy shift to remove content affiliated with white supremacy. At the time it was deleted, the channel had more than 450,000 subscribers. In September 2019, Allsup became a co-host for the Fash The Nation podcast hosted by The Right Stuff.

== Views ==
Allsup has described himself as a "paleoconservative" and a "right-wing libertarian". He has been described as a White Supremacist or White nationalist by many news outlets. The Southern Poverty Law Center lists him as an extremist and describes his ideology as alt-right and white nationalist. The Washington Post described him as a "budding alt-right figure" in 2017. He argues that he is not a white nationalist. Shortly after stepping down as president of the WSU College Republicans, he told KCPQ that "I have fully condemned the KKK, I have fully condemned Nazis, all of that kind of stuff."
