= Washington State University Everett =

Public university campus in Everett, Washington, U.S.

Coordinates: 48.005001°N 122.197486°W

- Type: Public
- Established: 2014
- Chancellor: Paul E. Pitre
- Students: 275
- Location: Everett, Washington, U.S.
- Colors: Crimson & Gray
- Nickname: Cougars
- Website: everett.wsu.edu

Washington State University Everett (WSU Everett) is a campus of Washington State University in Everett, Washington, United States. The land-grant research university was founded in 1890 and the Washington State Legislature approved funding for WSU to expand to Snohomish County in 2011. The campus began with a 95,000-square foot building costing $64 million. The campus was founded in 2014, and courses began in late 2017.

== History ==
Prior to its establishment, regional administrators and politicians had been working to establish a 4-year university in Snohomish County for 23 years. Since 1941, the primary source of higher education in the county was Everett Community College, serving over 19,000 students annually. Washington State University's expansion into Everett aimed to train engineers for the local aerospace and high-tech industries, particularly in Snohomish, Island and Skagit counties.

The campus officially opened in June 2017, with students beginning coursework in Fall 2017 Semester. WSU Everett recorded 222 enrolled undergraduate students for its Fall 2017 Semester, a 17.5% jump from the 189 enrolled the year prior. There is a 91.1 percent graduation rate.

== Campus ==
The main building is a 4 story, 95,000-square-foot (8,800 m^{2}) structure that cost $64.6 million to build. The building includes a roof with 80 kilowatt photovoltaic solar panels. The land is owned by Everett Community College.

The campus does not possess its own independent library and currently shares many of its resources with the neighboring Everett Community College. Everett Community College owns the land.

In 2018, WSU entered into an agreement with the Everett Housing Authority to purchase the 15-acre (6.1 ha) Baker Heights housing complex for construction of an expanded campus. The agreement was cancelled in 2021 after WSU scaled back its expansion plans. Having received a two-year allocation of $10 million from the 2019 state budget for land acquisition, the state legislature allowed a two-year extension to the allocation in finding and purchasing an alternate site after the Baker Heights deal fell through, but WSU let the allocation lapse in March 2023 after failing to find a suitable one within budget by the end of the extension.

== Student life ==
Opportunities for civic engagement by students include a local branch of the Associated Students of Washington State University (ASWSU), which works as an elected student government, the Institute of Electrical and Electronics Engineers for undergraduates involved in computer electrical design, and the non-profit organization Society of Women Engineers.

About 96 percent of students are residents of Washington state, with an average age of 26 years.
