= Professor Watchlist =

Website run by Turning Point USA

Professor Watchlist Education Watch
- Website type: Database of academics believed to "discriminate against conservative students"
- Available in: English
- Owners: Turning Point USA; Turning Point UK
- Website: Professor Watchlist; Education Watch
- Commercial: No
- Launched: 2016; 10 years ago
- Current status: Inactive (Ended March 2026)

Professor Watchlist was a website run by conservative advocacy organization Turning Point USA. The website listed academic staff which Turning Point believed "discriminate against conservative students, promote anti-American values and advance leftist propaganda in the classroom." It was launched in 2016 and had listed about 200 professors by December of that year.

Responses to the site include the American Association of University Professors and The New York Times raising fears that it threatens academic freedoms by harassing and intimidating staff, conservative magazine National Review describing it as an "irritable gesture" of victimhood by conservatives, and concerns about the safety and welfare of staff following a trend of threatening behavior and communication, including rape and death threats, being sent to listed faculty.

In December 2016, 1,500 professors and faculty from across the globe petitioned to have their name added to the list in solidarity with academics who had been targeted and intimidated following their listing, with the message that the listed are "the sort of company we wish to keep."

Turning Point UK also maintained a similar site, Education Watch, which has been described as "McCarthyism in the UK", gaining support from Conservative MP Jacob Rees-Mogg and Home Secretary Priti Patel. The Council for the Defence of the British Universities has also called Education Watch "populist rightwing propaganda".

== Sourcing ==
Concerns had been raised about the process in which academic staff were listed. Professors had reported being listed for any discussion of race or politics, including in academic publications. Julio Cesar Pino, a professor of Latin American history, was added to the list on the basis of rumors that the FBI may have investigated him for having connections to ISIS. Lamb, a director of constitutional enforcement and transparency at Turning Point, had described the site as "simply aggregating" professors who have been the subject of news reports.

David Carillo, an economics professor at Adams State University, which serves incarcerated students, appeared to be included on the watchlist simply for being an inmate himself. Carillo served a twenty-nine year sentence for being a co-conspirator in a gang-related murder in 1993, when he was twenty years old. Professor Watchlist provided no information regarding Carillo's political views.

Campus Reform, a part of the Leadership Institute, and Discover the Networks, a website run by the David Horowitz Freedom Center, were the sources for most of the professors initially listed on the Professor Watchlist.

== Concerns ==
Slate columnist Rebecca Schuman described the website as "abjectly terrifying" and said that she feared for the safety of the listed professors. Some have criticized the website as a threat to academic freedom; Hans-Joerg Tiede, the associate secretary for the American Association of University Professors' department of academic freedom, tenure and governance, told The New York Times, "There is a continuing cycle of these sorts of things. They serve the same purpose: to intimidate individuals from speaking plainly in their classrooms or in their publications." One professor included in the site, George Yancy, wrote that it is "essentially a new species of McCarthyism, especially in terms of its overtones of 'disloyalty' to the American republic".

According to Inside Higher Ed, some critics consider the website "more annoying than dangerous".

Critics including Peter Dreier of Occidental College—who was listed on the site for having criticized the National Rifle Association and using Howard Zinn's A People's History of the United States as a required text—have pointed out errors of fact that may have made Professor Watchlist less than reliable as a source of information. Dreier's entry formerly listed him as a former employee of the Industrial Areas Foundation and as the man who inspired college student Barack Obama to become a community organizer. Dreier identifies these claims about him as "complete fantasy". He also noted elements of his biography that the website completely omitted, such as his work with labor unions, his activism in favor of a minimum wage, and the books he wrote.

Kent State professor Julio Pino said to The New York Times that the site was "a kind of normalizing of prosecuting professors, shaming professors, defaming professors."

The website's organizers said that it simply provided conservative students with a guide to their professors, akin to RateMyProfessors.com, enabling them to avoid left-wing classes.

Over one hundred University of Notre Dame faculty members signed an open letter asking to be included in the site, saying in part:

We surmise that the purpose of your list is to shame and silence faculty who espouse ideas you reject. But your list has had a different effect upon us. We are coming forward to stand with the professors you have called "dangerous," reaffirming our values and recommitting ourselves to the work of teaching students to think clearly, independently and fearlessly.

In response to the Notre Dame letter, University of Chicago psychology professor Leslie Kay started the website "Free Academics". This website lists the names of professors across the United States who have signed it to ask for their names to be added to the list. As of December 2016, it had over 1,500 signatories.

The list has been accused of disproportionately targeting professors of color and other minority professors.

The website had been criticized for using surveillance-type propaganda to manipulate ideas of truth, equality, and freedom. Critics have compared Professor Watchlist to the actions of U.S. senator Joseph McCarthy, who tried to publicly identify American citizens as Communists and Communist sympathizers in the 1950s. The New York Times wrote that it was "a threat to academic freedom."

Hans-Joerg Tiede, a staff member of the American Association of University Professors, said of a professor who was named for writing a book chapter on teaching mathematics to minority ethnic children: "She was inundated with death threats. She was Jewish and received anti-Semitic threats and threats of sexual assault. Instances like that are happening with some regularity".

The website erroneously claimed that Hunter Biden would "assist in lecturing a course" at Tulane University in the fall semester of 2021.

== End of activity ==
Starting in March of 2026, the Professor Watchlist began returning security errors. By April 2026 it reported that it was offline for maintenance, and began returning a HTTP 301 error and redirecting users to the Turning Point, USA website. As of October 2026, Turning Point, USA has not released any statement regarding the removal of Professor Watchlist.

== See also ==
- 2020s anti-LGBTQ movement in the United States § Education (Pre-2025)
- Canary Mission
- Executive Order 14190
- Rate My Professors
- Reprisals against commentators on the Charlie Kirk assassination § Employee terminations and investigations
