= Turning Point Action =

U.S. conservative advocacy group

- Abbreviation: TPAction
- Formation: 2019; 7 years ago
- Founder: Charlie Kirk
- Type: 501(c)(4) organization
- Tax ID no.: 46-4331510
- Headquarters: Phoenix, Arizona
- Location: United States
- Website: www.tpaction.com

Turning Point Action (TPAction) is an American 501(c)(4) organization and political advocacy group that works directly with voters by providing necessary resources to elect conservative leaders. It was founded in 2019 by Charlie Kirk as the sister organization and political advocacy arm of Turning Point USA.

Leading up to the 2024 United States presidential election, TPAction launched "Chase The Vote", focused on deploying thousands of field organizers in key states to engage with voters through relationship-driven strategies to help elect Donald Trump. The program was dubbed as a "force multiplier" by Brian Hughes, a senior campaign advisor for Trump.

TPAction has hosted many rallies across the country, featuring prominent figures such as Donald Trump, Robert F. Kennedy Jr., JD Vance, Tulsi Gabbard, and others.

== History ==
In May 2019, it was reported that Kirk was "preparing to unveil" Turning Point Action, a 501(c)(4) entity allowed to campaign against Democrats. While the group is a separate organization from Turning Point USA, Forbes noted that both were founded by Kirk and use common marketing and branding styles.

In July 2019, TPAction acquired leasing rights to web domains and social media platforms of Students for Trump, a youth group founded in 2015 at Campbell University in North Carolina by John Lambert and Ryan Fournier. The Washington Post reported in 2023 that Students for Trump was separating from Turning Point Action after branding/revenue disputes.

In 2022, Tyler Bowyer left TPUSA to become full time COO of Turning Point Action as well as start the Turning Point PAC with Kirk.

In 2024, the Trump campaign partnered with Turning Point Action and other conservative groups to help execute a ground game strategy in key swing states, Arizona, Michigan, and Wisconsin. TPAction's "Chase the Vote" initiative was a new untested campaign tactic directly using outside organizations to lead canvassing efforts to turn out "low propensity right-wing voters", people who had a high chance to vote for Trump but a low chance to actually cast a ballot.

Chase the Vote's strategy was an answer to substantial Republican losses in the 2022 mid-term elections, which analysts attributed in part to Democrats having an edge with early voting. Due to this, embracing early voting instead of trying to change the voting habits of Republicans in a single voting cycle was a main element of this strategy. Post election data from Arizona suggests that the strategy succeeded.

Founder Charlie Kirk was assassinated at Utah Valley University in Orem, Utah, on September 10, 2025, during what would have been a series of events planned by the company. On September 18, 2025, Erika Kirk, the widow of Charlie Kirk and mother of their two children, was unanimously elected as the new CEO and Chair of the Board of Turning Point USA.

In March 2026, TPAction opened a headquarters in Las Vegas, Nevada as part of their "red wall" strategy which aims to replicate their campaigning success in Arizona by targeting low propensity Republican voters in key swing states. The opening was celebrated with a ribbon cutting ceremony where CEO Erika Kirk was in attendance as well as Nevada Republican Party Chair Michael McDonald.

== Activities ==
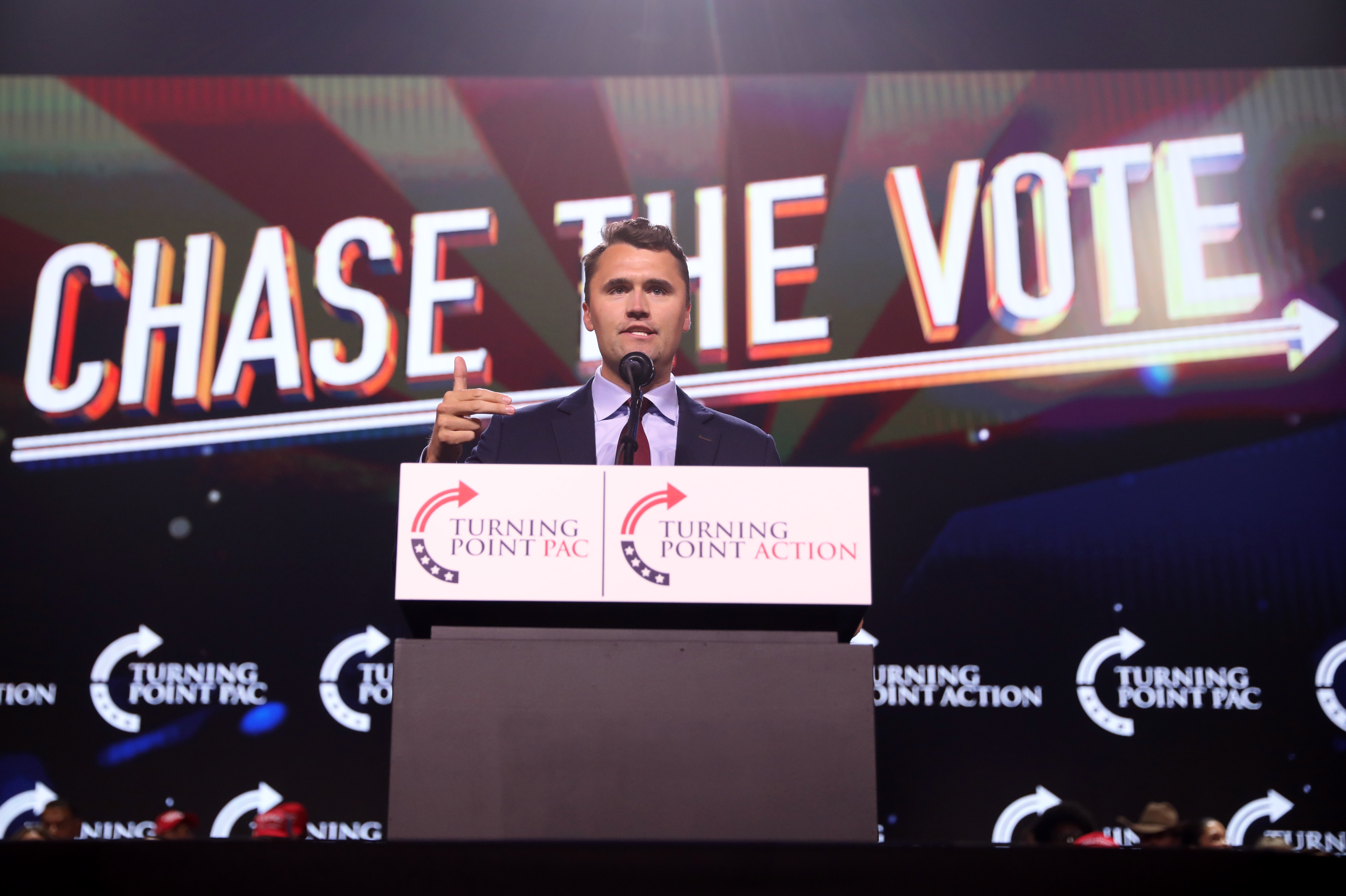
Charlie Kirk at Turning Point Action "Chase the Vote" rally

Turning Point Action is a 501(c)(4) non-profit organization which allows for participation in partisan political campaigns and elections. TPAction has campaigned for and hosted political rallies for many conservative politicians ranging from local offices all the way up to presidential candidates. Many prominent politicians are featured speakers/guests at TPAction activism conferences. During the 2024 presidential election, TPAction executed the largest and most effective ballot chasing operation in the country entitled "Chase the vote".

=== 2020 presidential election ===
In October 2020, Facebook permanently banned Arizona based marketing firm Rally Forge for running what some experts likened to a domestic "troll farm" on behalf of Turning Point Action. A month prior, The Washington Post reported that young people in Arizona, some of them minors, were posting Turning Point content on their social media accounts without disclosing their affiliation with Turning Point. The report from The Washington Post prompted an investigation by Facebook which ultimately concluded in the removal of 200 accounts and 55 pages on Facebook, as well as 76 Instagram accounts.

Twitter responded to the newspaper's questions by suspending at least 262 accounts for their involvement in "platform manipulation and spam." Facebook and Twitter did not penalize Turning Point because they could not ascertain if Turning Point leadership was aware of the actions being carried out on their behalf by Rally Forge.

Turning Point Action issued a statement saying they wanted to work with Facebook "to rectify any misunderstanding" about their content. Austin Smith, a field director for Turning Point, told The Washington Post: "This is sincere political activism conducted by real people who passionately hold the beliefs they describe online, not an anonymous troll farm in Russia."

Jake Hoffman, CEO of Rally Forge, said that "dozens of young people have been excited to share their beliefs on social media" and were "using their own personal profiles and sharing their content that reflects their values and beliefs."

On January 4, 2021, Kirk announced in a tweet that Turning Point Action would be sending more than 80 buses to a January 6, 2021, Trump "Stop the Steal" rally near the White House in Washington, D.C., to protest the outcome of the election. They sent seven buses with approximately 350 participants. Turning Point Action also donated to several "Stop the Steal" rally speakers, including Kimberly Guilfoyle, but did not organize or take part in the march to the Capitol that erupted in violence. Kirk later deleted the tweet and said on his podcast that it was "bad judgment" and "not wise" to enter the Capitol but not necessarily insurrectionist. A Turning Point Action spokesman later said the group condemns political violence.

=== 2024 presidential election ===
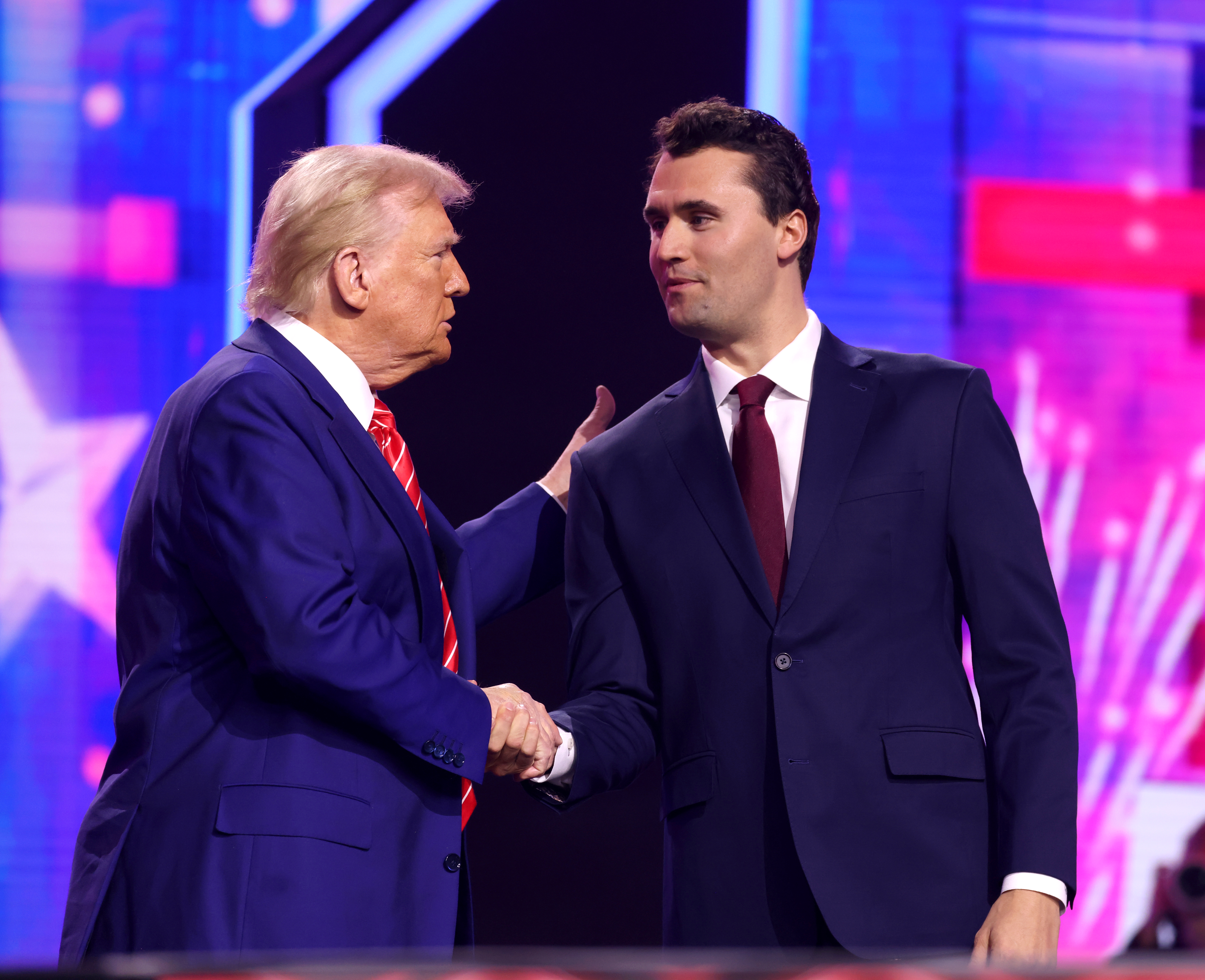
President of the United States Donald Trump with Charlie Kirk at an event co-hosted by Turning Point Action, AmericaFest, in December 2024

TPAction hosted a conference in July 2023 called "ACTCON"; it was hosted in West Palm Beach and drew roughly 6,000 attendees. It had several guest speakers including the event headliner Donald Trump and keynote speaker Tucker Carlson. According to The New York Times, the two day event drew roughly a third of the Republican presidential field as speakers.

On July 26, 2024, while addressing the crowd during Turning Point Action's Believers' Summit in West Palm Beach, Donald Trump told his supporters: "Christians, get out and vote, just this time! You won't have to do it anymore. Four more years, you know what, it will be fixed, it will be fine. You won't have to vote anymore, my beautiful Christians."

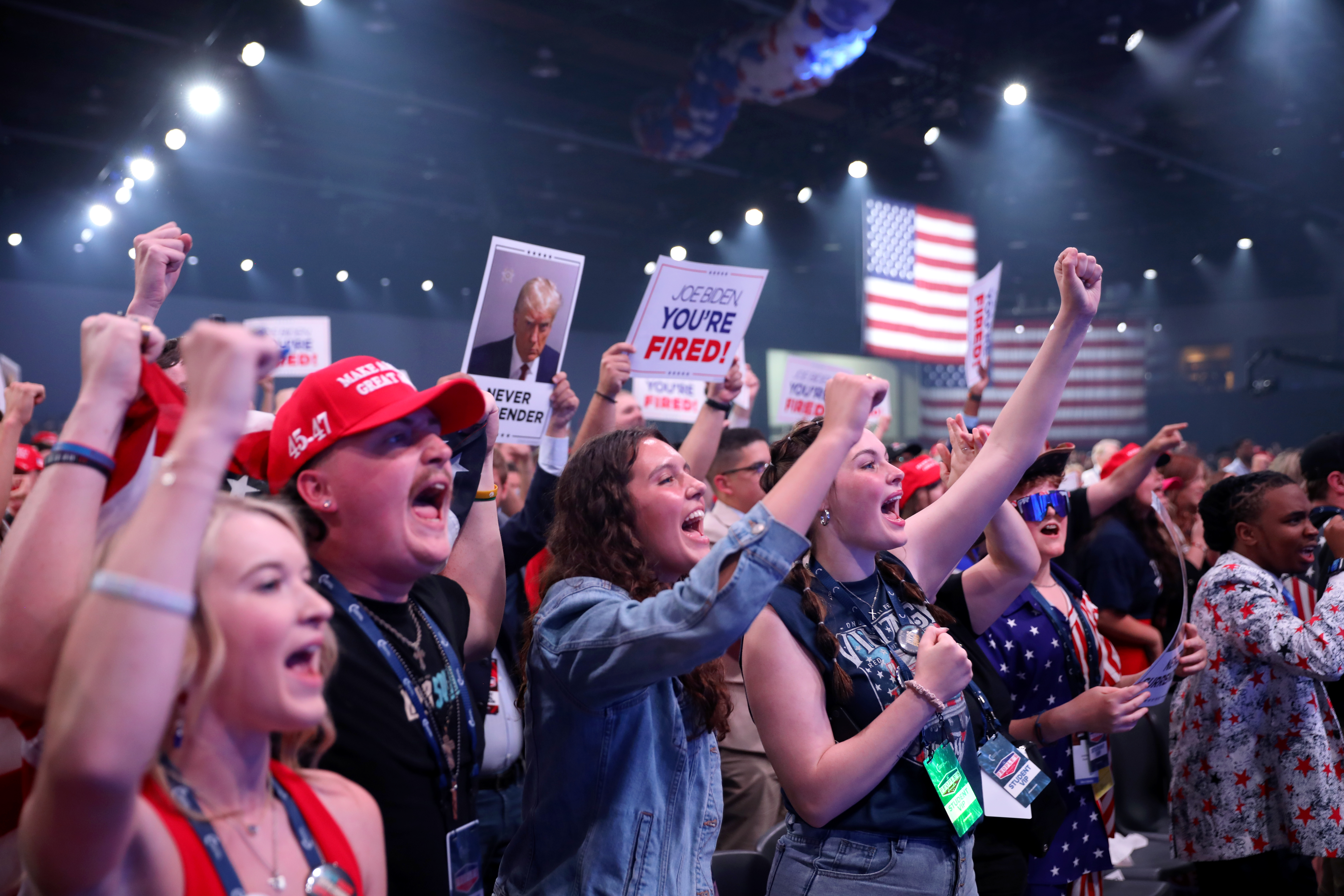
Attendees at a Turning Point Action-hosted event, The People's Convention, in Detroit, Michigan

For the 2024 presidential campaign, Turning Point Action launched a "chase the vote" program that saw 1,000 people hired for voter outreach with a focus on younger voters as well as low-propensity Republican voters in all key battleground states, including Arizona, Wisconsin, partially in Michigan and Pennsylvania. Voter turnout operations are typically run by national and state Republican parties or candidates' own campaigns, but in 2024 a Federal Election Commission decision allowed campaigns to coordinate canvassing with outside groups. For Turning Point, that has meant hiring staffers, developing a canvassing app and staffing tables at both on- and off-campus events. In Wisconsin, TPAction combined their canvassing efforts with those of America PAC.

Before the 2024 election TPAction brought Moms for America into their "Chase the Vote" alliance. The partnership's goal was to have Moms for America help promote events. They also launched a new app focused on get-out-the vote (GOTV) tactics, which provided data with insights to key targets to "chase" during the election cycle.

During the 2024 presidential election, Brian Hughes, a senior advisor on the Trump campaign, called TPAction's field program a "force multiplier" that allowed for more efficient deployment of campaign and RNC assets in key battleground states.

==== "You're being brainwashed" tour ====
Prior to the 2024 presidential election, Charlie Kirk visited around 25 college campuses in the "You're being brainwashed" tour. To encourage Gen Z voter turnout, he engaged in debates with students on a range of political topics. According to Turning Point Action, the tour produced around two billion views on social media. The tour has been praised as having a "critical role" in helping Donald Trump get elected.

=== Commit 100 ===
In 2024, TPAction started "Commit 100", a voter-contact field program which grew into a major campaigning force that contacted more than 552,000 people through various methods including calling, texting, mailing postcards and knocking on doors.

=== 2025 Arizona Governor rally ===
In May 2025, TPAction put on a rally for Rep. Andy Biggs to aid in his bid for Governor of Arizona. Thousands of people attended the rally (many of whom were sporting MAGA hats and T-shirts), which was held in a ballroom of the Arizona Biltmore Resort. Many other Republican lawmakers made appearances to show support including Rep. Burgess Owens (Utah), Rep. Eli Crane (Arizona), Rep. Paul Gosar (Arizona), Lauren Boebert (Colorado), and former Rep. Matt Gaetz (Florida). Before Biggs took the stage to speak, Charlie Kirk opened up with a few words encouraging all who were listening to remember that the very first Trump rally was held in Phoenix back in 2015.

=== Mesa council member recall election ===
In July 2025, TPAction was asked to help with a citizen organized effort to collect enough local signatures to meet a recall election threshold for council member Julie Spilsbury, a moderate Republican in her second term. This effort included the distribution of anti-Spilsbury material around the city's district 2. After the recall election signature threshold was met and exceeded by citizens signing to recall Spilsbury, the council voted unanimously, including Spilsbury, in favor of the recall election. The recall petition outlined that she was guilty of using her political influence for private gain in three specific votes spanning between 2023 and 2024. These three votes pertained to the use of Biden administration ARPA funds for the conversion of a hotel to a homeless shelter, raising city utility rate structures, and increasing council salaries. Spilsbury was censured by the Republican parties of legislative districts 9 and 10, both stating she is no longer recognized as a part of the Republican Party. Another council member voiced an opinion that Spilsbury might be being recalled because she openly supported presidential nominee Kamala Harris.

In November 2025, the Arizona election became nationalized when Spilsbury, one of the national leaders and co-chair of "Republicans for Harris", was recalled from the Mesa district-two seat. She was defeated by Dorean Taylor, a candidate backed by numerous District 2 residents and the Republican parties of legislative district 9 and 10, and supported by TPAction through their ballot chasing efforts. Spilsbury received heavy criticism from her opponents for her approval of Mesa's 2021 nondiscrimination ordinance, which her opponents said permitted trans women into women's bathrooms and locker rooms. The recall was one of the last campaigns Charlie Kirk was involved in with TPAction before his assassination. Some believed this election was an indicator if Turning Point could still remain a political force after Kirk's passing.

=== All in for Indiana rally ===
In December 2025, Turning Point Action hosted the “All in for Indiana” rally at the Indiana statehouse to put pressure on Republican state senators to redistrict. The rally was made up of around 200 people and had Gov. Mike Braun and Lt. Gov. Micah Beckwith along with several other state politicians speak to the crowd making the case for redistricting.

=== 2026 Salt River Project election ===
In 2026, TPAction got directly involved with the Salt River Project board election, registering voters, sending text messages, as well as putting up signs at intersections and all around the metro area. This utility board election received national media attention as well as three times as many early ballots requested compared to two years ago. TPAction backed the sitting board president and vice president, Chris Dobson and Barry Paceley, who ended up winning their respective races while their opposition was backed by several progressive organizations including Jane Fonda Climate PAC and Sierra Club. The goal was to keep more progressive Green New Deal type candidates/policies out so that energy rates did not rise. This also gave TPAction an opportunity to build relationships with voters between larger-scale elections.

=== Build the Red Wall ===
In April 2026, Turning Point Action hosted the "Build the Red Wall" event at the Dream City Church in Phoenix, AZ. The "Red Wall" refers to a political strategy to turn several critical states (including Arizona) "red" (Republican). The event hosted many guest speakers with an emphasis on Arizona politicians such as Andy Biggs, Paul Gosar, Juan Ciscomani as well as some other high profile figures such as Turning Point CEO Erika Kirk, President Donald Trump, Jeremy Roenick, and Danica Patrick.

==== 2026 Iowa Grassroots ====
Even with the state of Iowa trending more towards the right in recent years, the state is considered a battleground for the 2026 midterms. With a Governor and senator seat both being vacated by Republicans (Sen Joni Ernst & Gov. Kim Reynolds) TPA focused on doubling their grassroots foothold in Iowa to help in their campaigning effort. AssociatedPress News has stated TPA's grassroots foothold growing in Iowa as well as Nevada and New Hampshire could provide beneficial to who ever Republicans run for president in 2028. In September 2026, they set up a booth at the Iowa state fair where staffers handed out buttons, registered people to vote and invited them to attend social events.

== Endorsements ==
=== 2026 ===
==== Iowa gubernatorial primary ====
In May 2026, Turning Point Action officially endorsed Zach Lahn, who later won the Iowa gubernatorial primary nomination, receiving 37.68% of the vote. Lahn ran on a platform aimed at improving Iowa public schools, protecting farmers and addressing Iowa's growing cancer rate by opposing liability shields for pesticide companies, particularly regarding glyphosate. Lahn was also endorsed by the MAHA PAC, linked to the Make America Healthy Again movement.

==== Florida primary ====
Turning Point, President Trump, and many of his supporters have endorsed the candidacy of Sydney Gruters in a 2026 bid to fill the seat of retiring Vern Buchanan in the U.S. Congress. Her husband, Joe Gruters, worked on Buchanan's 2006 campaign early in his political career. To run for the federal office, she resigned from her 2023 appointment to the position of executive director of the New College Foundation at New College of Florida that had been made by Governor DeSantis during what several outlets called a controversial restructuring of the state honors college.

== Controversies ==
=== COVID-19 vaccination in the United States ===
In 2021, Kirk compared Biden's vaccination efforts to an "Apartheid-style open air hostage situation". Text messages sent by Turning Point Action using Twilio automatically enrolled donors under a recurring monthly plan. Kirk's spokesperson said they are not anti-vaxx, reiterating that "the vaccine makes logical sense for millions of Americans" but they should "have the freedom to choose", and Kirk was advocating against vaccine mandates and passports for healthy young people. The same spokesperson said the text messages from Turning Point Action were not approved by Kirk and that the automatic contribution function was added by a vendor.

=== Resignation of Austin Smith ===
In April 2024, Arizona state representative Austin Smith, who was an "election integrity warrior" and the TPAction National Field Administrative Director, resigned his TPAction position and quit his state reelection race after he was accused of forging voter signatures on documents he filed for his reelection run.

=== Indictment and presidential pardon of Tyler Bowyer ===
On April 24, 2024, TPAction COO Tyler Bowyer was indicted on nine charges in connection with the 2020 Arizona fake electors plot. On May 21, 2024, Bowyer and 10 of his 17 co-defendants pled not guilty after being arraigned in Maricopa County Superior Court. Bowyer was among five people who made their not guilty plea virtually rather than in-person. In May of 2025, Maricopa County Superior Court Judge Sam J. Myers found that prosecutors failed to provide the grand jury the full text of the Electoral Count Act to the grand jury, which outlines how presidential electoral votes are cast and counted. This ruling meant that Attorney General Kris Mayes would have to convene a new grand jury and share the text of the act in its entirety if she wanted to proceed. The ruling was appealed by Mayes in September 2025, and that appeal was denied. The Arizona Republican Party issued a response to the denied appeal reiterating that the indictment was "politically motivated". In November 2025, Bowyer received a presidential pardon from Donald Trump for his involvement.
