= Council for the Defence of the British Universities =

Council for the Defence of British Universities
- CDBU
- Abbreviation: CDBU
- Formation: 2012; 14 years ago
- Type: CLG
- Region served: United Kingdom
- Chair of the Executive Committee: Julian Preece
- Website: CDBU Official website

The Council for the Defence of British Universities (CDBU) is a group of individuals who express worries about the long-term direction of higher education policy in the United Kingdom and lobby for fundamental changes. They particularly oppose the marketisation of Higher Education in the country.

The CDBU was founded in November 2012 by 66 founding members, including Sir Michael Atiyah, Sir David Attenborough, Alan Bennett, Sir Colin Blakemore, Dame Ruth Deech, Baroness Deech, Marcus du Sautoy, Sir Deian Hopkin, Sir Tim Hunt, Sir Paul Nurse, Dame Bridget Ogilvie, David Pannick, Baron Pannick, Sir Roger Penrose, Martin Rees, Baron Rees of Ludlow, Quentin Skinner, and Sir Peter Swinnerton-Dyer. It is incorporated in England as a not for profit company limited by guarantee.

== Governance ==
The CDBU is run by an executive committee whose chair is Julian Preece. Current members of the executive committee are Susan Bruce, John Holmwood, Ron Barnett, Kelli Rudolph, Benedict Loewe, Christopher Cunningham, Carlos Azevedo, Steven Jones, Terrence Karran, James Ladyman, Anne Sheppard, Aneez Esmail and David Wolton. The current chair of the board of trustees (since 2020) is Rowan Williams, Baron Williams of Oystermouth.

== Campaigns and activities ==
CDBU's three main campaigns are dealing with the Teaching Excellence Framework (TEF), precarious employment in Higher Education, and private for-profit universities. CDBU organises events and annual lectures; the speaker of the 2019 CDBU lecture was Stephen Toope, the Vice Chancellor of Cambridge University. The speaker at the 2017 AGM was FT journalist and writer, Martin Wolf. The guest speaker in 2013 was Stefan Collini.
