= Students for Trump =

U.S. youth political group in support of Donald Trump

- National Chairman: Ryan Fournier
- Founded: 2015
- Headquarters: Phoenix, Arizona, U.S.
- Website: trumpstudents.org

Students for Trump (S4T) is an American group whose mission was to elect President Donald Trump. The group was founded in 2015 by two college students, Ryan Fournier and John Lambert.

In July 2019, Charlie Kirk, CEO of Turning Point USA, partnered with S4T to enlist one million "Students for Trump" across college campuses. Although the joint operation failed to secure President Trump's re-election in 2020 and disbanded in 2023, Trump would return to office the following year.

== History ==
Students for Trump was founded in 2015 by Ryan Fournier and John Lambert, students at Campbell University in North Carolina, United States, who started tweeting positively about Donald Trump. The Houston Chronicle reported that George Lombardi, a New York City real estate developer and friend of Donald Trump who—among hundreds of Trump-supporting Facebook groups—had set up a "Students for Trump" Facebook group, acted as an advisor. On August 6, 2015, Fournier and Lambert were impressed by then high schooler Alexander Chalgren, who appeared as a questioner on the first Fox News Republican primary debate. Alexander asked a question of the candidates concerning ISIL, which was cited as the "most important" question of the evening. The question sparred an intense debate between then Mr. Donald Trump and Senator Ted Cruz. Students for Trump founders reached out to Mr. Chalgren via Instagram inquiring as to his political affiliation, and found him to be an early supporter of Donald Trump. After a brief interview and screening process, Chalgren was offered an integral early position within the organization as South Carolina Director, but eventually rose to the post of National Director. Mr. Chalgren is South Carolina Governor Henry McMaster's adopted cousin. Alexander made his second debut onto the national scene in his This American Life interview with Zoe Chace in 2016. According to The New York Times, Chalgren—who is gay and black—was "arguably the most famous young Trump supporter" at the time.

Fournier's first television appearance for the organization was on TBS. Students for Trump activities were highlighted in a BBC documentary, "Trump's Unlikely Superfans," and an NBC News exclusive titled "Students for Trump: Meet the Millennials Who Want Him to Win." In 2016, the organization switched from a traditional campaign model with Regional, State, and Chapter coordinators, to a model with Campus Ambassadors that perform roles similar to that of a campaign field intern. In August 2016, The Chronicle of Higher Education reported that the organization "had nearly 300 campus chapters and a bevy of social-media followers – 29,000 on Twitter, 59,000 on Instagram, thousands more on Facebook."

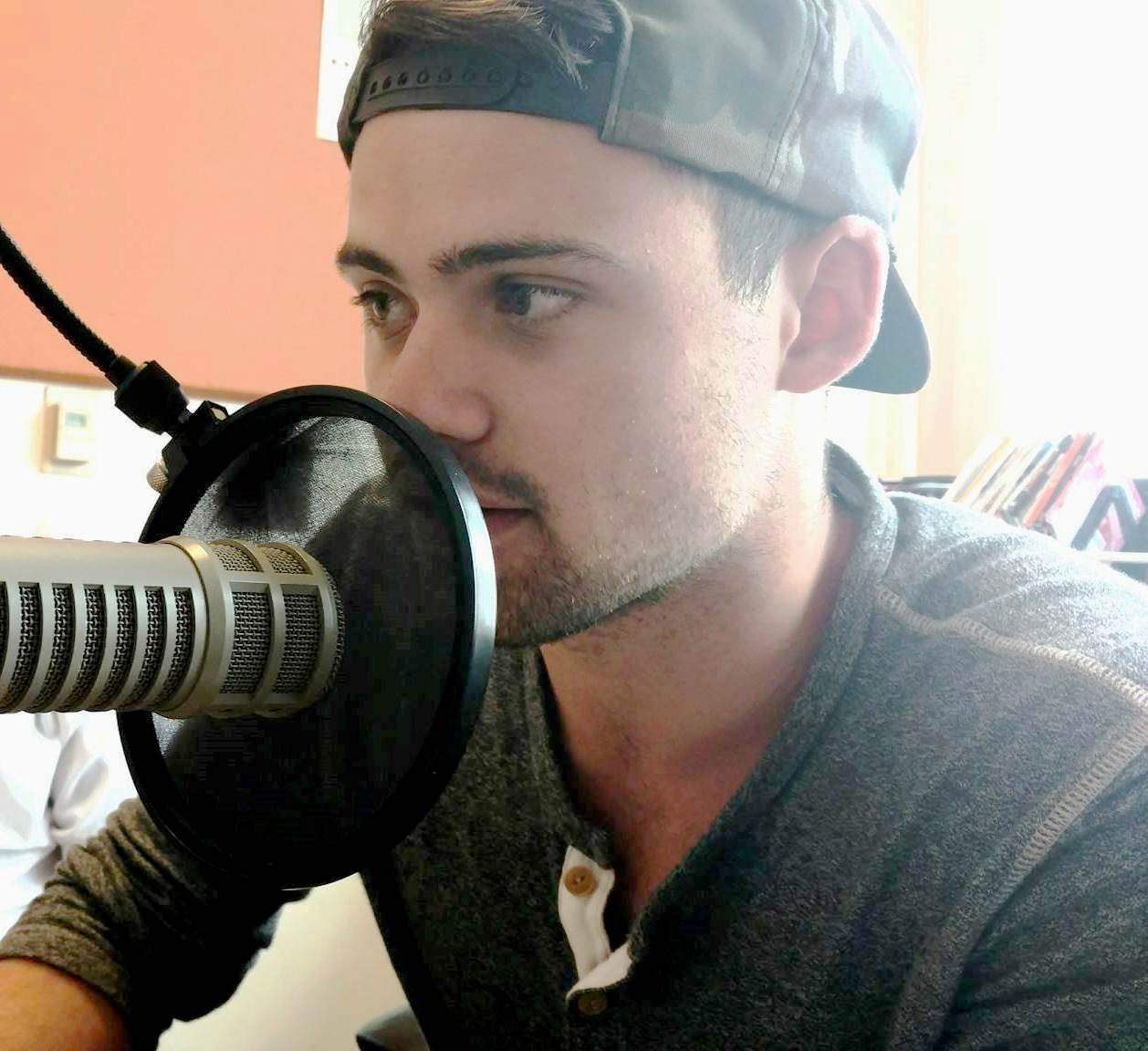
James Allsup on air

The campaign however, had numerous problems before and after the election. In April 2016, a Students for Trump Florida chapter placed a "Make America Great Again" ball cap on a statue of Martin Luther King Jr. just days after the anniversary of his death, prompting widespread outrage. Salon magazine reported that Ryan Fournier worked with white nationalists when he was head of Students for Trump. Media Matters said that Fournier hired white nationalist James Allsup as director of the Campus Ambassador Program. Allsup was a member of the American Identity Movement and marched at the Unite the Right rally in Charlottesville.

By March 2017, following Trump's election as President of the United States, The College Fix reported that the organization's chapters had "largely disbanded or halted meetings." In February 2018, The Daily Beast reported that Students for Trump had never correctly complied with making reports to the Federal Election Commission as a political action committee. The FEC wrote nine letters to the organization requesting information about donors without response, but ultimately decided to take no action other than to warn the political action committee.

On June 23, 2020, Students for Trump held their Arizona Convention at the Dream City church in Phoenix with featured speaker President Donald J. Trump. The event occurred during the COVID-19 pandemic that peaked in the region. Phoenix Mayor Kate Gallegos said that masks would not be required for the event and officials of the Dream City church claimed that air ionizers would protect participants, despite the lack of evidence for its efficacy.

=== Leasing of social media accounts by Turning Point Action ===
On July 2, 2019, the non-profit organisation Turning Point Action acquired leasing rights to web domains and social media platforms Students for Trump.

Later in July 2019, National Chairman Fournier was invited to the White House to discuss liberal bias in social media.

In 2020, Charlie Kirk, CEO of TPAction, briefly served as chair and launched a campaign to recruit one million students for the 2020 Trump reelection campaign. The unsuccessful effort led to TPUSA and the Trump campaign blaming each other for an overall decline in youth support for Trump.

In early February 2023, The Washington Post reported that Students for Trump was separating from Turning Point Action after branding/revenue disputes. Shortly after the article was published, TPAction published a press release stating that the Students for Trump social media accounts would "continue its work with a broad coalition of partners to elect Donald Trump in 2024." The same press release clarified the relationship between TPAction and Students for Trump stating that "Turning Point Action managed and operated SFT social media accounts since the 2020 election cycle". It is unclear if disputes were resolved ahead of the 2024 election.

== Co-founders Fournier and Lambert ==
=== Ryan Fournier ===
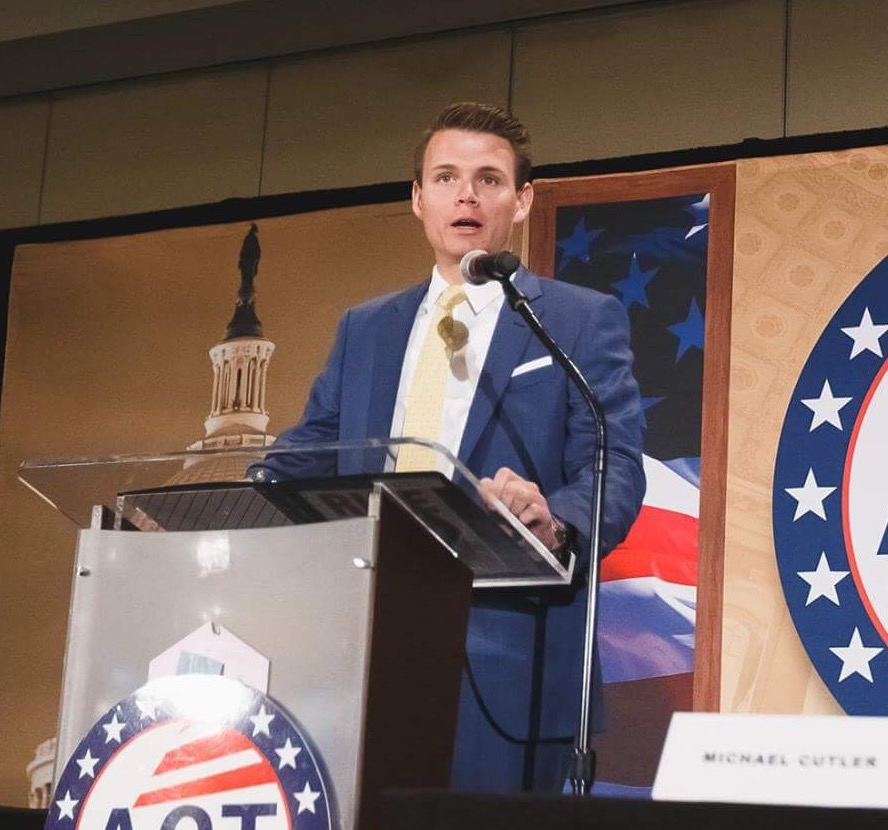
The group's founder, Ryan Fournier

The organization's co-founder, Ryan Fournier, is from Long Branch, New Jersey. Fournier became politically active following his volunteer work for the Mitt Romney 2012 presidential campaign. Prior to launching Students for Trump, Fournier was involved in various local and state political campaigns within North Carolina. Along with being the co-chairman of Students for Trump, Fournier also serves as the president of OpenPoll and xStrategies.

In 2015, Fournier and John Lambert launched Students for Trump as a Twitter account while they were studying at Campbell University in Buies Creek, North Carolina. Fournier graduated from Campbell University in May 2019 with a degree in political science. He is also a member of the Kappa Alpha Order fraternity, Zeta Psi chapter. Fournier is a recipient of the Red Alert Politics 30 Under 30 Award.

In July 2018, Fournier launched a boycott against Walmart for selling shirts labeled "Impeach 45," which resulted in the hashtag #BoycottWalmart trending on Twitter. Walmart pulled the items from its online store, issuing the following statement: "These items were sold by third-party sellers on our open marketplace, and were not offered directly by Walmart. We're removing these types of items pending review of our marketplace policies."

In November 2023, Fournier was arrested and charged with one count of assault with a deadly weapon and one count of assault on a female, as he allegedly grabbed his girlfriend by her right arm and pistol whipped her. The charges were dismissed on December 18, 2023.

In September 2025, Fournier falsely accused the associate principal of an elementary school in Wisconsin of having posted that Charlie Kirk, who had been killed two days earlier, "deserves everything he got". He also posted her picture and her phone number and email address as well as the school's, resulting in a deluge of threatening calls and emails. The school's principal reached out to Fournier who did not respond and waited two days before retracting his post with what the principal called a "half-assed" apology.

=== John Lambert ===
Lambert, a Tennessee native, was arrested in Tennessee in April 2019 on federal charges of wire fraud for posing online as a corporate and patent lawyer from 2016 to 2018, swindling consumers and businesses out of more than $46,000. He pleaded guilty in 2019 and signed a plea deal in 2019 whereby he will forfeit $46,654 and not appeal any sentence of up to 21 months of imprisonment. In May 2021, he was sentenced to 13 months in prison.

== Projects ==
=== "Trump Wall" events ===
On May 9, 2016, a group of students at the University of Washington constructed an 8'x10' "Trump Wall" out of plywood and lumber in the center of the Red Square courtyard. The event, led by UW College Republicans president Jessie Gamble, UW Students for Trump president Chevy Swanson, and S4T senior advisor James Allsup, lasted for approximately an hour and a half, and was met with 10 Trump supporters and over 100 protestors. The wall was painted with a brick design, with "Trump Wall" written on it. At one point, a student attempted to scale the wall. Shortly after this, the organizers were asked by the University Police to take the wall down, which they did. Portland State University Students for Trump, a group unaffiliated with the S4T national organization, hosted a similar event on June 10, 2016.
