= Associated Students of Washington State University =

- Abbreviation: ASWSU
- Established: June 30th, 1928 (93 years ago)
- Founded at: Pullman, Washington
- Location: Pullman, Washington state, United States
- Coordinates: 46.725168°N 117.159598°W
- President: Luke Deschenes
- Vice President: Maccabee Werndorf
- Website: aswsu.wsu.edu

ASWSU refers to the Associated Students of Washington State University. This student government organization encompasses the Washington State University Pullman campus, the Global Campus, Vancouver Campus, Everett Campus, Tri-Cities Campus, and Spokane Campus. Each campus has its own student government and all the student governments come together multiple times a year for the Student Government Council (SGC). The elections happen every spring the Wednesday before spring break.

== ASWSU-Pullman executive branch ==
The Executive Branch currently comprises:

- Luke Deschenes (President)
- Maccabee Werndorf (Vice President)
- Bailey Berger (Chief of Staff and Finances)
- Bryce Becker (Director of Student Health & Safety)
- Cooper Howe (Director of Communication)
- Nicole Allison (deputy director of Communication)
- Alvin Azana (Director of Diversity, Inclusion, & Veteran Affairs)
- JoJo Maestas (deputy director of Diversity, Inclusion, & Veteran Affairs)
- Sophie Kirov (Director of University Affairs)
- Sophia Schnell (deputy director of Student Affairs & Academic Affairs)
- Kassandra Vogel (deputy director of Campus Sustainability)
- Collin Bannister (Director of Legislative Affairs)
- Savannah Eakin (deputy director of Legislative Affairs)
- Dylan Smentek (deputy director of Legislative Affairs)
- Sebastian Sanders (Director of Community Affairs)

== 49th ASWSU Senate ==
The undergraduate student population at Washington State University is currently represented in the 49th ASWSU Senate by the following:

- Bryce Regian (All Campus Senator)
- Brenda Avila (All Campus Senator)
- Chelsea Thumberg (All Campus Senator)
- Malvin Malai-Harrison (All Campus Senator)
- Dawson Dalfrey (All Campus Senator)
- Melissa Torres (All Campus Senator)
- Jocelyn Granados (Uncertified Senator)
- Jelani Christopher (Uncertified Senator)
- Andrew Fritz (Uncertified Senator)
- Wendy Alcantar (Uncertified Senator)
- Richard Aquino (Carson College of Business Senator)
- Donavyn Velez-Fucal (Carson College of Business Senator)
- Mayalin Nakasone (Voiland College of Engineering and Architecture Senator)
- Diana Sotelo (College of Arts and Sciences Senator)
- Connor Simmons (College of Arts and Sciences Senator)
- Bailey McCoy (College of Arts and Sciences Senator)
- Oluwanifemi Shola-Dare (Veterinary Medicine Senator)
- Kaye Wilds Gill (CAHNRS Senator)
- VACANT (Murrow College of Communication Senator)
- Hannah Martian (College of Education Senator)
- Annaka Brayton (Honors College Senator)
- Jacob Martinez (Freshman Delegate)
- Kathryn Carstens (Freshman Delegate)
- Albert James (Administrative Assistant)

== 48th ASWSU Senate ==
The composition of the 48th ASWSU Senate:

- Taylor Heersink (All Campus Senator)
- Grant Esomonu (All Campus Senator)
- Chase Urquhart (All Campus Senator)
- Grace Lim (All Campus Senator)
- Bailey McCoy (All Campus Senator)
- James Myers (All Campus Senator)
- Jocelyn Granados (Uncertified Senator)
- Rachel Kenitzer (Uncertified Senator)
- Camille Naputo (Uncertified Senator)
- Curtis Cohen (Uncertified Senator)
- Lindsay Schilperoort (CAHNRS Senator)
- Hayden Arend (Honors College Senator)
- VACANT (College of Arts and Sciences Senator)
- VACANT (College of Arts and Sciences Senator)
- Synthia Alcantar (College of Arts and Sciences Senator)
- A'Jenae Hardwell (College of Arts and Sciences Senator)
- Diana Baldovinos (Carson College of Business Senator)
- Karen Ngigi (Carson College of Business Senator)
- Hannah Martian (College of Education Senator)
- Kiera Rust (Voiland College Of Engineering and Architecture Senator)
- Taylor Swanson (Murrow College of Communication Senator)
- Hayden Arend (Honors Delegate)
- Jelani Christopher (Freshman Delegate)
- Monica Chavez (Freshman Delegate)
- Serena Rex (Freshman Delegate)
- Armando Valenzuela (Transfer Delegate)

== 47th Senate key legislation ==
The ASWSU Senate is composed of representatives from each of the academic colleges as well as larger jurisdictions, such as all-campus and uncertified, with the role of legislating on behalf of the undergraduate students of Washington State University. One of the earliest key pieces legislation and projects under the 47th Senate (Fall 2017 to Spring 2018) was re-establishing the 'Issues & Forums' committee that fosters political discussion between different points of view, which was led by Senator Schilperoort of the Washington State University College of Agricultural, Human, and Natural Resource Sciences. Another major endeavor was renaming a plaza on campus on behalf of the Multicultural Greek Community at WSU, partly led by Senator Hernandez of the Carson College of Business. All-Campus Senator Pielow authored bills to strengthen the independent and unbiased role of an election board, initiating requirements for all Senators to disclose their affiliated RSOs to tackle fiscal nepotism, and introducing new voter registration campaigns at WSU's dorms during the Week of Welcome. Senators Parchem and Dalton, along with Delegate Brown, attempted to introduce a mandatory sports pass for all undergraduates at WSU, though it was eventually thwarted by Senator Pielow. Honors College Delegate Arend had authored and passed a constitutional amendment that changed the position of Honors College Delegate into Honors College Senator, which was eventually passed and ratified by the voters.

== Historical lobbying efforts ==
ASWSU on most of the campuses recently voted to opt out of the Washington Student Association as a lobbying group. Campus leaders did not believe the lobbying group was providing enough for what students' were paying. ASWSU President (Pullman) Jake Bredstrand also remarked that the addition of community colleges in the lobbying group as it "brings in other schools that have needs far different from ours". The campus newspaper (The Daily Evergreen) recently supported the decision, stating their opinion that "A coalition can be accomplished without a middle-man like the WSA and if it involves more direct talk between Washington colleges, then we all might find a way out of this budget crisis together". ASWSU will now form a "Cougar Coalition" that will lobby exclusively for Washington State University.

== See also ==
- Washington State University
