= Ryan Fournier =

American political activist and radio talk show host (born 1995)

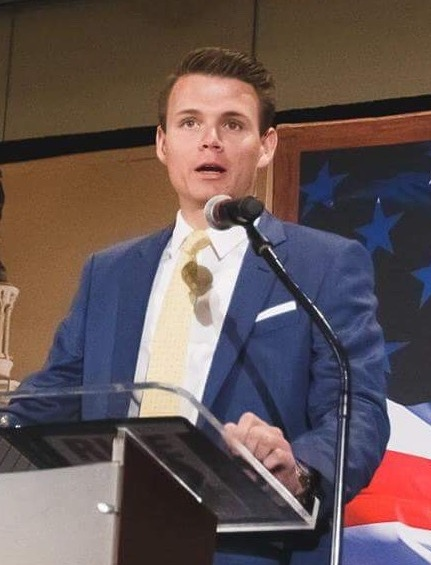
- Fournier in 2019
- Born: December 8, 1995 (age 30); Long Branch, New Jersey, U.S.
- Education: Campbell University
- Occupations: Political activist, writer
- Years active: 2012–present
- Organization: Students for Trump
- Political party: Republican

Ryan Austin Fournier (born December 8, 1995) is an American conservative activist and political commentator. He is the co-founder and acting national chairman of Students for Trump. He drew national attention in 2025 after falsely accusing a Wisconsin elementary school associate principal of celebrating the assassination of Charlie Kirk.

== Early life and education ==
Fournier was born in Long Branch, New Jersey, on December 8, 1995, and spent his formative years in Clayton, North Carolina.

== Career ==
Fournier became politically active following his volunteer work for the Mitt Romney 2012 presidential campaign. Prior to launching Students for Trump, Fournier was involved in various local and state political campaigns within North Carolina. Along with being the co-chairman of Students for Trump, Fournier also serves as the President of OpenPoll and xStrategies.

In July 2018, Fournier launched a boycott against Walmart for selling shirts labeled "Impeach 45," which resulted in the hashtag #BoycottWalmart trending on Twitter. Walmart pulled the items from its online store, issuing the following statement: "These items were sold by third-party sellers on our open marketplace, and were not offered directly by Walmart. We're removing these types of items pending review of our marketplace policies."

== Students for Trump ==
In 2015, Fournier and John Lambert launched Students for Trump as a Twitter account while they were studying at Campbell University in Buies Creek, NC. Within a year, the group had nearly 300 campus chapters and a considerable social media following.

In May 2021, The Daily Beast reported that Fournier testified against long-time friend and co-founder of Students for Trump, John Lambert, in a case where the latter was accused of setting up a fictional New York law firm to pose as experienced attorneys and scam clients. Lambert was sentenced to 13 months in jail for multiple counts of wire fraud. Lambert's defense attorney has named Fournier as the co-conspirator in the case, suggesting that Lambert and Fournier used various gig sites to market themselves as licensed attorneys.

In September 2025, Fournier falsely accused the associate principal of an elementary school in Wisconsin of having posted that Charlie Kirk, who had been killed two days earlier, "deserves everything he got". He also posted her picture and her phone number and email address as well as the school's, resulting in a deluge of threatening calls and emails. The school's principal reached out to Fournier who did not respond and waited two days before retracting his post with what the principal called a "half-assed" apology.

== Views ==
In a since-deleted Facebook post on June 11, 2020, Fournier claimed that donations to Black Lives Matter were being funneled to Democratic campaigns through ActBlue, a Democratic Super PAC. Similar allegations were made by other conservative commentators, such as Candace Owens and the Hodgetwins. The Associated Press and fact-checking website PolitiFact rated the claim as false.

In a tweet dated January 31, 2021, Fournier claimed that the "Biden administration lost 20 million COVID vaccines...". According to PolitiFact, the Biden administration wasn't responsible for losing the vaccines and that the distribution infrastructure under which these vaccines went missing were set up during the Trump administration. PolitiFact rated Fournier's allegations on the missing vaccines as false.

On April 20, 2021, Fournier shared a Facebook post with an image reading "Derek Chauvin did not get a fair trial". The statement was later retracted as an opinion. USA Today fact-checked Fournier's statement and considered it as missing context and ignoring the steps taken to ensure the trial was held in a fair manner.

== Arrests ==
On November 21, 2023, Fournier was arrested in Johnston County, North Carolina, for allegedly assaulting his girlfriend with a deadly weapon. Charges were eventually dropped by the district attorney.

On May 26, 2026, Fournier was arrested in Washington, D.C., and charged with possession of cocaine and "simple assault and attempted threats to do bodily harm." The victim was a new girlfriend. Fournier's associate Jordan Daley, who claimed to be Fournier's security detail, was also arrested on charges of impersonating a Secret Service agent.
