= List of Donald Trump 2016 presidential campaign endorsements =

This is a list of notable individuals and organizations who voiced their endorsement for the office of the president of Donald Trump as the Republican Party's presidential nominee for the 2016 U.S. presidential election.

== Former U.S. federal government ==
=== Vice presidents ===
- Dick Cheney, 46th vice president of the United States (2001–2009)
- Dan Quayle, 44th vice president of the United States (1989–1993)

=== Federal cabinet-level officials ===
- John Ashcroft, 79th United States attorney general (2001–05)
- William Bennett, 3rd United States secretary of education (1985–88)
- John Rusling Block, 21st United States secretary of agriculture (1981–86)
- John R. Bolton, 25th United States ambassador to the United Nations (2005–06)
- Elaine Chao, 24th United States secretary of labor (2001–09)
- Edwin Meese, 75th United States attorney general (1985–88)
- Jim Nicholson, 5th United States secretary of veterans affairs (2005–07)
- Gale Norton, 48th United States secretary of the interior (2001–06)
- Anthony Principi, 4th United States secretary of veterans affairs (2001–05)
- Donald Rumsfeld, 13th and 21st United States secretary of defense (1975–77, 2001–06)
- John W. Snow, 73rd United States secretary of the treasury (2003–06)
- Tommy Thompson, 19th United States secretary of health and human services (2001–05)
- James G. Watt, 43rd United States secretary of the interior (1981–83)

=== Federal departmental officials ===
U.S. Department of Agriculture

- Liz Cheney, former deputy assistant secretary of state for Near Eastern affairs and head of the Middle East Partnership Initiative; daughter of former Vice President Dick Cheney
- Charles F. Conner, former United States deputy secretary of agriculture (2005–09)

U.S. Department of Defense

- William G. Boykin, ret. 3-star general, deputy under secretary of defense for intelligence (2002–07)
- Chapman B. Cox, assistant secretary of the Navy (Manpower and Reserve Affairs) (1983–84)
- Michael Flynn, (Note: Indicated support before Donald Trump's presumptive nomination on May 4.) ret. 3-star general, Director of the Defense Intelligence Agency (2012–14) (Democratic)
- Jeffrey D. Gordon, Pentagon spokesman (2005–09)
- J. William Middendorf, United States secretary of the Navy (1974–77)
- Joseph E. Schmitz, inspector general (2002–05)
- Herbert R. Temple Jr., chief of the National Guard Bureau (1986–90)
- William Winkenwerder Jr., former United States assistant secretary of defense for health affairs (2001–07)

U.S. Department of Energy

- William Flynn Martin, United States deputy secretary of energy (1986–88)

U.S. Department of Health and Human Services

- Don M. Newman, United States deputy secretary of health and human services (1985–89)

U.S. Department of State

- Robert B. Charles, assistant secretary of state for international narcotics and law enforcement affairs (2003–05)

U.S. Department of Justice

- Peter Ferrara, former associate deputy attorney general (1991–93)

=== Independent agencies and commissions ===
- Gary Berntsen, officer of the Directorate of Operations (1982–2005)
- Vernon L. Grose, former member of the National Transportation Safety Board
- Dorcas Hardy, commissioner of the Social Security Administration (1986–89)
- Kay Coles James, former director of United States Office of Personnel Management (2001–05)
- Edmund C. Moy, director of the United States Mint (2006–11)
- Daniel Oliver, chairman of the Federal Trade Commission (1986–90)
- Linda M. Springer, director of the United States Office of Personnel Management (2005–08)
- R. James Woolsey Jr., director of Central Intelligence (1993–95) (Democratic)

=== U.S. ambassadors ===
- Charles L. Glazer, El Salvador (2007–09)
- G. Philip Hughes, Barbados, Dominica, St Lucia, Antigua, St. Vincent, and St. Christopher-Nevis-Anguilla (1990–93)
- Douglas Kmiec, Malta (2009–11)
- John D. Ong, Norway (2002–05)
- Francis Rooney, Holy See (2005–08)
- Faith Whittlesey, Switzerland (1981–83, 1985–88)

=== Other White House staff ===
- Pat Buchanan, White House communications director (1985–87)
- T. Kenneth Cribb Jr., director of the Domestic Policy Council (1987)
- Michael Johns, co-founder and national leader of the U.S. Tea Party movement and former White House speechwriter
- Jeff Lord, White House associate political director (1987–88)

== U.S. Congress ==
=== U.S. senators ===
Current

- ~~Kelly Ayotte, NH-Class 3~~ (previously endorsed Trump, later stated she did not vote for Trump)
- John Barrasso, WY-Class 1
- Roy Blunt, MO-Class 3
- John Boozman, AR-Class 3
- Richard Burr, NC-Class 3
- Bill Cassidy, LA-Class 2
- Dan Coats, IN-Class 3
- Thad Cochran, MS-Class 2
- Bob Corker, TN-Class 1
- John Cornyn, maj. whip, TX-Class 2
- Tom Cotton, AR-Class 2
- Ted Cruz, TX-Class 1
- Mike Enzi, WY-Class 2
- Joni Ernst, IA-Class 2
- Chuck Grassley, IA-Class 3
- Orrin Hatch, Pres. pro tempore, UT-Class 1
- John Hoeven, ND-Class 3
- Jim Inhofe, OK-Class 2
- Johnny Isakson, GA-Class 3
- Ron Johnson, WI-Class 3
- Mitch McConnell, maj. leader, KY-Class 2
- Jerry Moran, KS-Class 3
- Rand Paul, KY-Class 3
- David Perdue, GA-Class 2
- Pat Roberts, KS-Class 2
- Marco Rubio, FL-Class 3
- Tim Scott, SC-Class 3
- Jeff Sessions, AL-Class 2
- Thom Tillis, NC-Class 2
- David Vitter, LA-Class 3
- Roger Wicker, MS-Class 1

Former

- Kit Bond, Missouri (1987-2011)
- Scott Brown, MA (2010–13)
- Ben Nighthorse Campbell, CO (1993–2005)
- Jeffrey Chiesa, NJ (2013)
- Tom Coburn, OK (2005–15)
- Alfonse D'Amato, NY (1981–99)
- Bob Dole, maj. leader, KS (1969–96)
- Bob Kasten, WI (1981–93)
- Trent Lott, maj. leader, MS (1989–2007)
- Mack Mattingly, GA (1981–87)
- Bob Packwood, OR (1969-1995)
- Rick Santorum, PA (1995–2007)
- Bob Smith, NH (1990–2003)
- Jim Talent, MO (2002–2007)

=== U.S. representatives ===
Current

- Ralph Abraham, LA
- Robert Aderholt, AL
- Rick W. Allen, GA
- Mark Amodei, NV
- Brian Babin, TX
- Lou Barletta, PA-11
- Joe Barton, TX
- Mike Bishop, MI
- Rob Bishop, UT
- Charles Boustany, LA
- Dave Brat, VA
- Jim Bridenstine, OK
- Vern Buchanan, FL
- Ken Buck, CO
- Larry Bucshon, IN
- Michael Burgess, TX
- Bradley Byrne, AL
- Buddy Carter, GA
- John Carter, TX
- Steve Chabot, OH
- Curt Clawson, FL
- Tom Cole, OK
- Chris Collins, NY
- Doug Collins, GA
- Mike Conaway, TX
- Paul Cook, CA
- Ryan Costello, PA-6
- Rick Crawford, AR
- John Culberson, TX
- Jeff Denham, CA
- Ron DeSantis, FL
- Scott DesJarlais, TN
- Mario Díaz-Balart, FL
- Dan Donovan, NY
- Jeff Duncan, SC
- Jimmy Duncan, TN
- Renee Ellmers, NC
- Tom Emmer, MN
- Blake Farenthold, TX
- Mike Fitzpatrick, PA-8
- Chuck Fleischmann, TN
- John Fleming, LA
- Bill Flores, TX
- Randy Forbes, VA
- Virginia Foxx, NC
- Trent Franks, AZ
- Rodney Frelinghuysen, NJ
- Scott Garrett, NJ
- Bob Gibbs, OH
- Bob Goodlatte, VA
- Paul Gosar, AZ
- Trey Gowdy, SC
- Sam Graves, MO
- Tom Graves, GA
- Morgan Griffith, VA
- Glenn Grothman, WI
- Frank Guinta, NH
- Brett Guthrie, KY
- Gregg Harper, MS
- Andy Harris, MD
- Vicky Hartzler, MO
- Jeb Hensarling, TX
- Jody Hice, GA
- French Hill, AR
- George Holding, NC
- Richard Hudson, NC
- Tim Huelskamp, KS
- Randy Hultgren, IL
- Duncan D. Hunter, CA
- Darrell Issa, CA
- Evan Jenkins, WV
- Lynn Jenkins, KS
- Bill Johnson, OH
- Sam Johnson, TX
- Walter B. Jones Jr., NC
- Mike Kelly, PA-3
- Trent Kelly, MS
- Peter T. King, NY
- Steve King, IA
- John Kline, MN
- Raul Labrador, ID
- Darin LaHood, IL
- Doug LaMalfa, CA
- Doug Lamborn, CO
- Leonard Lance, NJ
- Bob Latta, OH
- Billy Long, MO
- Barry Loudermilk, GA
- Frank Lucas, OK
- Blaine Luetkemeyer, MO
- Cynthia Lummis, WY
- Tom MacArthur, NJ
- Kenny Marchant, TX
- Tom Marino, PA
- Thomas Massie, KY
- Kevin McCarthy, maj. leader, CA
- Michael McCaul, TX
- Tom McClintock, CA
- Patrick McHenry, NC
- David McKinley, WV
- Cathy McMorris Rodgers, WA
- Mark Meadows, NC
- Luke Messer, IN
- John Mica, FL
- Candice Miller, MI
- Jeff Miller, FL
- John Moolenaar, MI
- Alex Mooney, WV
- Markwayne Mullin, OK
- Mick Mulvaney, SC
- Randy Neugebauer, TX
- Dan Newhouse, WA
- Kristi Noem, SD
- Rich Nugent, FL
- Pete Olson, TX
- Steven Palazzo, MS
- Gary Palmer, AL
- Steve Pearce, NM
- Scott Perry, PA-4
- Robert Pittenger, NC
- Joe Pitts, PA-16
- Mike Pompeo, KS
- Bill Posey, FL
- Tom Price, GA
- John Ratcliffe, TX
- Tom Reed, NY
- Jim Renacci, OH
- Tom Rice, SC
- Phil Roe, TN
- Hal Rogers, KY
- Mike Rogers, AL
- Dana Rohrabacher, CA
- Todd Rokita, IN
- Dennis A. Ross, FL
- Keith Rothfus, PA-12
- David Rouzer, NC
- Ed Royce, CA
- Steve Russell, OK
- Paul Ryan, WI, House speaker
- Matt Salmon, AZ
- Mark Sanford, SC
- Steve Scalise, maj. whip, LA
- David Schweikert, AZ
- Austin Scott, GA
- Jim Sensenbrenner, WI
- Pete Sessions, TX
- John Shimkus, IL
- Bill Shuster, PA
- Adrian Smith, NE
- Chris Smith, NJ
- Jason T. Smith, MO
- Lamar Smith, TX
- Elise Stefanik, NY
- Steve Stivers, OH
- Marlin Stutzman, IN
- Dave Trott, MI
- Michael Turner, OH
- Ann Wagner, MO
- Tim Walberg, MI
- Greg Walden, OR
- Mark Walker, NC
- Jackie Walorski, IN
- Mimi Walters, CA
- Randy Weber, TX
- Brad Wenstrup, OH
- Bruce Westerman, AR
- Lynn Westmoreland, GA
- Roger Williams, TX
- Rob Wittman, VA
- Steve Womack, AR
- Rob Woodall, GA
- Kevin Yoder, KS
- Ted Yoho, FL
- David Young, IA
- Don Young, AK
- Todd Young, IN
- Lee Zeldin, NY

Former

- Steve Austria, OH (2009–13)
- Bob Barr, GA (1995–2003)
- Kerry Bentivolio, MI (2013–15)
- John Boehner, speaker, OH (1991–2015)
- Paul Broun, GA (2007–15)
- Eric Cantor, maj. leader, VA (2001–14)
- Joseph Cao, LA (2009–11)
- Bob Dornan, CA (1977–1983, 1985-1997)
- Mark Foley, FL (1995-2006)
- Virgil Goode, VA (1997–2009)
- Jack Kingston, GA (1993–2015)
- James Lightfoot, IA (1985–97)
- Bob Livingston, LA (1977–99)
- Tom Luken, OH (1974–75, 1977–91) (Democratic)
- Bob McEwen, OH (1981–93)
- Guy Molinari, NY (1981–89)
- Sue Myrick, NC (1995–2013)
- Doug Ose, CA (1999–2005)
- Joe Walsh, IL (2011–13)
- Frank Wolf, VA (1981–2015)

== U.S. state officials ==
=== State and territorial governors ===
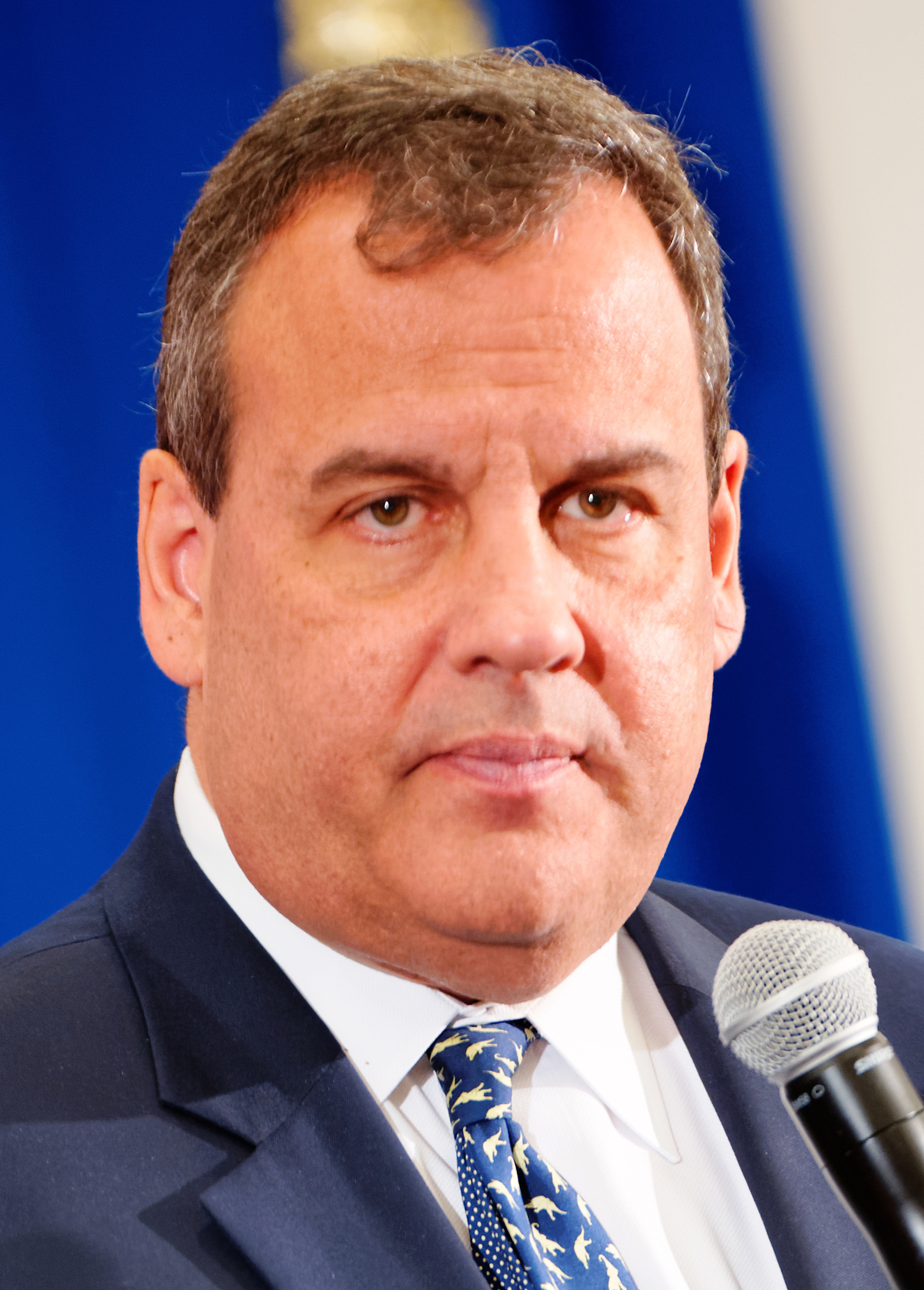
New Jersey Governor Chris Christie in 2015

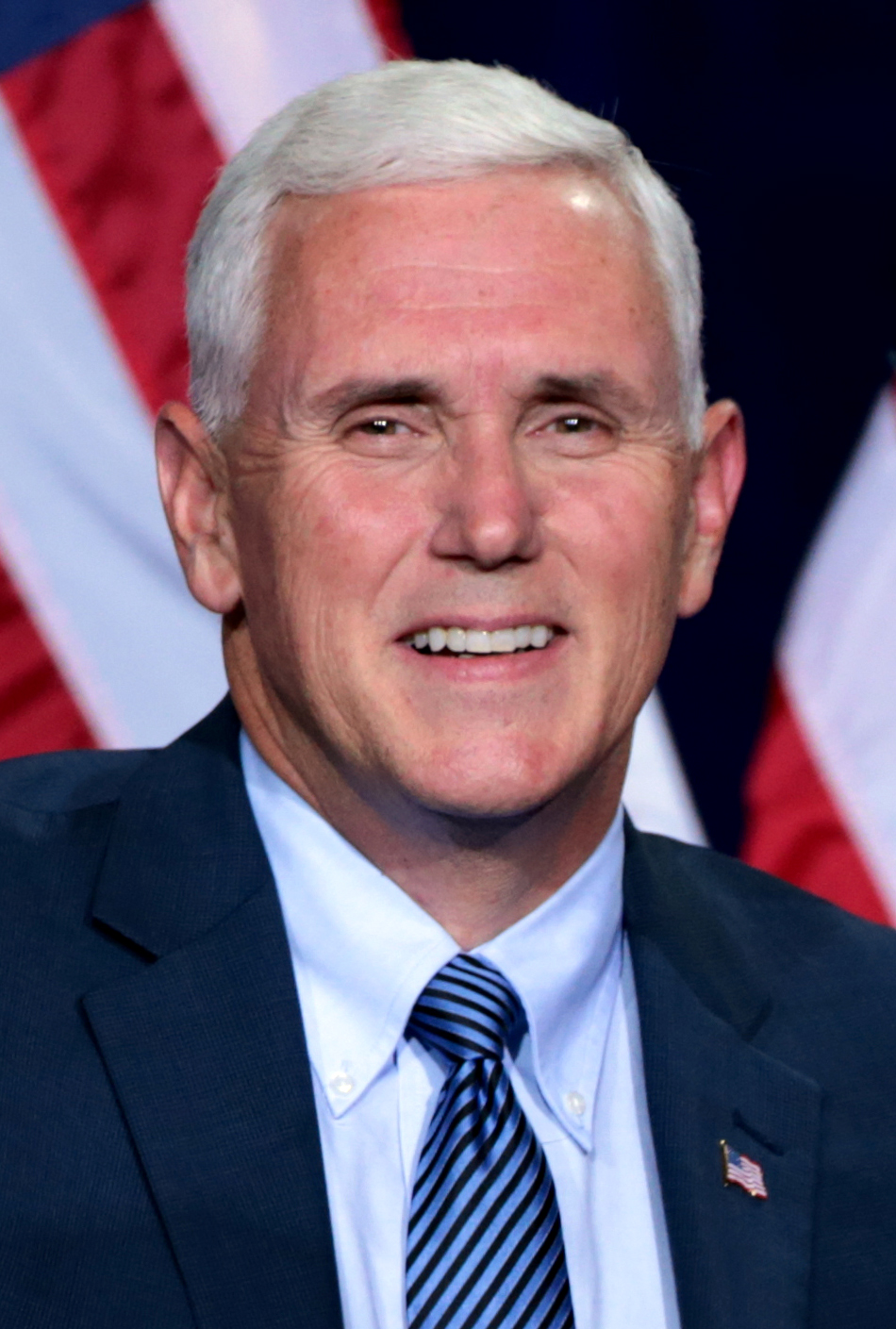
Governor Mike Pence in 2016

Current

- Greg Abbott, 48th governor of Texas
- Matt Bevin, 62nd governor of Kentucky
- Terry Branstad, 39th & 42nd governor of Iowa
- Sam Brownback, 46th governor of Kansas
- Phil Bryant, 64th governor of Mississippi
- Eddie Calvo, 8th governor of Guam
- Chris Christie, 55th governor of New Jersey
- Jack Dalrymple, 32nd governor of North Dakota
- Doug Ducey, 23rd governor of Arizona
- Mary Fallin, 27th governor of Oklahoma
- Nikki Haley, 116th governor of South Carolina
- Asa Hutchinson, 46th governor of Arkansas
- Paul LePage, 74th governor of Maine
- Pat McCrory, 74th governor of North Carolina
- Matt Mead, 32nd governor of Wyoming
- Mike Pence, 50th governor of Indiana (Trump later nominated Pence as his running mate for his campaign.)
- Pete Ricketts, 40th governor of Nebraska
- Rick Scott, 45th governor of Florida
- Ralph Torres, 9th governor of the Northern Mariana Islands
- Scott Walker, 45th governor of Wisconsin

Former

- Haley Barbour, 63rd governor of Mississippi (2004–12)
- Jan Brewer, 22nd governor of Arizona (2009–15)
- Donald DiFrancesco, 51st governor of New Jersey (2001–02)
- Bob Ehrlich, 60th governor of Maryland (2003–07)
- Jim Gilmore, 68th governor of Virginia (1998–2002)
- Dave Heineman, 39th governor of Nebraska (2005–15)
- Mike Huckabee, 44th governor of Arkansas (1996–2007)
- Bobby Jindal, 55th governor of Louisiana (2008–16)
- Frank Keating, 25th governor of Oklahoma (1995–2003)
- Linda Lingle, 6th governor of Hawaii (2002–10)
- Sarah Palin, 9th governor of Alaska (2006–09)
- Sonny Perdue, 81st governor of Georgia (2003–11)
- Rick Perry, 47th governor of Texas (2000–15)
- Don Sundquist, 47th governor of Tennessee (1995–2003)
- John H. Sununu, 75th governor of New Hampshire (1983–89), White House chief of staff (1989–91)

=== State executive officials ===
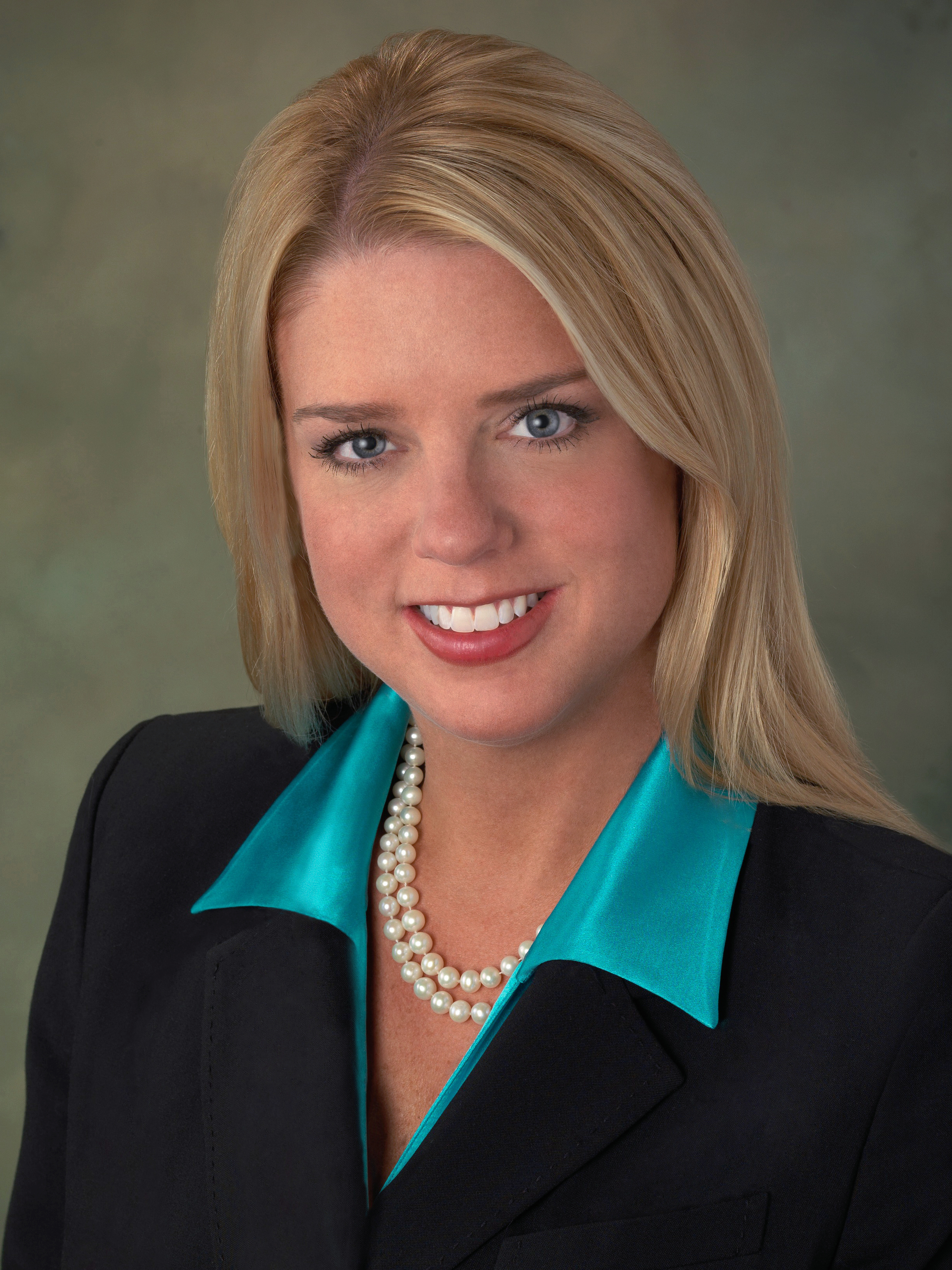
Attorney General of Florida Pam Bondi

Current

- Pam Bondi, 37th attorney general of Florida
- George P. Bush, 28th commissioner of the Texas General Land Office
- Mike DeWine, 50th attorney general of Ohio
- Jeff DeWit, 43rd state treasurer of Arizona
- Diane Douglas, Arizona superintendent of public instruction
- Lynn Fitch, 34th Mississippi state treasurer
- Tim Griffin, 16th lieutenant governor of Arkansas
- Jon Husted, 50th Ohio secretary of state
- Mark Hutchison, 34th lieutenant governor of Nevada
- Cindy Hyde-Smith, 7th Mississippi commissioner of agriculture and commerce
- Peter Kinder, 46th lieutenant governor of Missouri
- Kris Kobach, 31st secretary of state of Kansas
- Adam Laxalt, 33rd Nevada attorney general
- Josh Mandel, 48th Ohio state treasurer
- Henry McMaster, 91st lieutenant governor of South Carolina
- Sid Miller, 12th Texas commissioner of agriculture
- Mary Mosiman, auditor of Iowa
- Bill Northey, 4th Iowa secretary of agriculture
- Dan Patrick, 42nd lieutenant governor of Texas
- Jim Reese, 4th Oklahoma secretary of agriculture
- Sean Reyes, 21st attorney general of Utah
- Kim Reynolds, 47th lieutenant governor of Iowa
- Leslie Rutledge, 56th attorney general of Arkansas
- Bill Schuette, 53rd attorney general of Michigan
- Ryan Sitton, Texas railroad commissioner
- Eric Skrmetta, Louisiana public service commissioner
- Michael G. Strain, 9th Louisiana commissioner of agriculture and forestry
- Mary Taylor, 65th lieutenant governor of Ohio
- Walter E. Whitcomb, commissioner of the Maine Department of Agriculture, Conservation and Forestry
- Dave Yost, 32nd Ohio state auditor

Former

- André Bauer, 87th lieutenant governor of South Carolina (2003–11)
- Ken Blackwell, 48th Ohio secretary of state (1999–2007)
- Margaret Farrow, 42nd lieutenant governor of Wisconsin (2001–03)
- John H. Hager, 37th lieutenant governor of Virginia (1998–2002)
- Evan Hultman, 28th attorney general of Iowa (1961–65)
- Jerry Kilgore, 42nd attorney general of Virginia (2002–05)
- Loren Leman, 8th lieutenant governor of Alaska (2002–06)
- Mead Treadwell, 11th lieutenant governor of Alaska (2010–14)
- Cathy Zeuske, 31st state treasurer of Wisconsin (1991–95)

=== State legislators ===
- Alabama state representative: Ed Henry
- Alaska state senators: John Coghill, Charlie Huggins, Lesil McGuire
- Alaska state representative: Mike Chenault
- Arizona state representative: Phil Lovas
- California state senators: Tom Berryhill Mike Morrell, Jeff Stone, Joel Anderson
- California state assemblymen: Jay Obernolte and Bob Pacheco, Melissa Melendez, Travis Allen, Matthew Harper
- Colorado state senators: Ray Scott, John Cooke, Kent Lambert, Vicki Marble, Tim Neville, Jerry Sonnenberg, Laura J. Woods
- Colorado state representatives: Clarice Navarro, Jon Becker, Perry Buck, Dan Nordberg, Bob Rankin, Lori Saine, James Wilson, JoAnn Windholz
- Connecticut state senators: Kevin C. Kelly, Michael A. McLachlan
- Connecticut state representatives: Anthony D'Amelio,
- Delaware state senator: Colin Bonini
- Florida state senators: Dennis Baxley, Joe Negron
- Florida representatives: Matt Gaetz and Lake Ray, Gayle Harrell, Debbie Mayfield, MaryLynn Magar, Michelle Rehwinkel Vasilinda (Independent)
- Georgia state senators: Burt Jones, Michael Williams, John Wilkinson
- Georgia state representative: Steve Tarvin
- Iowa state senators: Brad Zaun, Jerry Behn, Julian Garrett, David Hartsuch, Ken Rozenboom, Tom Shipley
- Iowa state representatives: Robert Bacon, Linda Upmeyer, Dawn Pettengill, Megan Jones, Mary Ann Hanusa, Linda Miller, Mike Sexton, Dave Deyoe, Dean Fisher
- Maryland state Senators: Justin Ready, H. Wayne Norman Jr., J. B. Jennings
- Maryland state representatives: Susan W. Krebs, Richard Impallaria, Pat McDonough
- Massachusetts state representatives: Geoff Diehl, Keiko Orrall
- Michigan state senators: Jack Brandenburg, Joe Hune, Mike Green, Arlan Meekhof, Judy Emmons
- Michigan state representative: Kevin Cotter
- Mississippi state representatives: Becky Currie, Alex Monsour, Margaret Rogers, Gary Chism, and Gary Staples
- Missouri state senators: Brian Munzlinger, Mike Parson, Eric Schmitt
- Nebraska state senator: Beau McCoy
- Nevada state senators: Michael Roberson, Don Gustavson
- Nevada state assemblymen: Brent A. Jones and Chris Edwards, Paul Anderson, Jill Dickman, Ira Hansen, Jim Wheeler, Philip "P.K." O'Neill
- New Hampshire state senators: Nancy Stiles, Jeb Bradley, Chuck Morse
- New Hampshire state representatives: Shawn Jasper
- New Jersey assemblyman: Robert Auth and State Assemblywoman Holly Schepisi
- New Jersey state senators: Michael J. Doherty and Joe Pennacchio
- New Mexico state representatives: Alonzo Baldonado, Sharon Clahchischilliage
- New York state senators: John DeFrancisco, Martin Golden
- New York state assemblyman: Bill Nojay (deceased)
- North Carolina state senators: W. Brent Jackson
- North Carolina state representatives: Julia C. Howard, Pat Hurley, Linda P. Johnson, Pat McElraft, Michele D. Presnell
- North Dakota state representative: Michael Don Brandenburg
- Ohio state senator: Keith Faber
- Ohio state representative: Cliff Rosenberger
- Oklahoma state senators: Eddie Fields
- Oregon state senators: Brian Boquist, Alan Olsen
- Oregon state representatives: Vic Gilliam, Mike Nearman, Sherrie Sprenger, John Huffman
- Pennsylvania state Senators: Camera Bartolotta, Michele Brooks, Kim Ward
- Pennsylvania state representatives: Mike Vereb, Mauree Gingrich, Julie Harhart, Sandra Major, Donna Oberlander, Kristin Phillips-Hill, Tina Pickett, Kathy Rapp, Judy Ward, Jerry Knowles, Stephen Barrar, Daryl Metcalfe, Eric Nelson, Greg Rothman, Rick Saccone, Kerry Benninghoff, Stephen Bloom, Martin Causer, Jim Christiana, Lynda Schlegel-Culver, Sheryl M. Delozier, Russ Diamond, George Dunbar, Cris Dush, Brian Ellis, Eli Evankovich, Garth Everett, Seth Grove, Marcia Hahn, Doyle Heffley, Sue Helm, David Hickernell, Rich Irvin, Lee James, Barry Jozwiak, Rob Kauffman, Ryan Mackenzie, Ron Marsico, John McGinnis, David R. Millard, Dan Moul, Mark Mustio, Jason Ortitay, John D. Payne, Jeff Pyle, Mike Regan, Mike Reese, Brad Roae, Tommy Sankey, Stan Saylor, Craig Staats, Will Tallman, Tarah Toohil, Ryan Warner, Jeff Wheeland, David H. Zimmerman
- South Carolina state senator: Katrina Shealy
- South Carolina state representative: James H. Merrill (former majority leader)
- South Dakota state senators: Ried Holien, Larry Rhoden
- Tennessee senator: Mae Beavers
- Texas State senators: Donna Campbell, Lois Kolkhorst, Paul Bettencourt, Craig Estes, Bob Hall, Charles Perry
- Texas state representatives: Byron Cook, Charlie Geren, Todd Ames Hunter, Geanie Morrison, Larry Phillips, James White, Doc Anderson, Dustin Burrows, Tom Craddick, Pat Fallon, Dan Huberty, Mark Keough, Phil King, Jodie Anne Laubenberg, Will Metcalf, Jim Murphy, Tan Parker, Dennis Paul, Ron Simmons, Drew Springer Jr., Tony Tinderholt, Bill Zedler, John M. Zerwas
- Utah state representatives: Greg Hughes (Speaker), Jake Anderegg
- Utah state senators: Ralph Okerlund (Senate Majority Leader), David Hinkins
- Virginia state senators: Mark Obenshain, Jill Vogel, Frank Wagner
- Virginia state delegates: Ron Villanueva and Scott Taylor, Brenda Pogge, Rob Bell, Glenn Davis, Terry Kilgore, Dave LaRock
- Washington state senator: Don Benton
- West Virginia state senators: Donna J. Boley and Bill Cole (president), Ryan Ferns, Richard Ojeda (Democrat)
- West Virginia state delegates: Ray Canterbury, Joshua Nelson, Randy Smith, and Ron Walters
- Wisconsin state senators: Alberta Darling, Mary Lazich, Scott L. Fitzgerald
- Wyoming state representative: Hans Hunt

Former

- Arizona state senators: Lori Klein, Thayer Verschoor
- California state senator: Tony Strickland
- California state assemblymen: Martin Garrick
- Colorado state legislators: Rep. B.J. Nikkel (Colorado co-chairman and Colorado Women For Trump Coalition director), Senator Greg Brophy (Colorado co-chairman)
- Florida state commissioner: Louis E. Sola
- Idaho state representative: Phil Hart
- Iowa state senators: Kitty Rehberg, Sandy Greiner
- Iowa state representatives: Teresa Garman, Annette Sweeney, Dave Tjepkes, Kenneth Veenstra, Ralph Watts, Betty De Boef
- Louisiana state senator: Troy Hebert (Independent)
- Michigan state senators: Randy Richardville,
- Michigan state representatives: Rick Johnson, Andrew Richner
- Ohio state representatives: Matt Huffman
- South Carolina state senator: Jake Knotts
- Texas state representatives: Martha Wong, Wayne Christian
- Virginia state senators: Jeannemarie Devolites Davis, Jeff McWaters

== U.S. municipal officials ==
=== Mayors and county executives ===
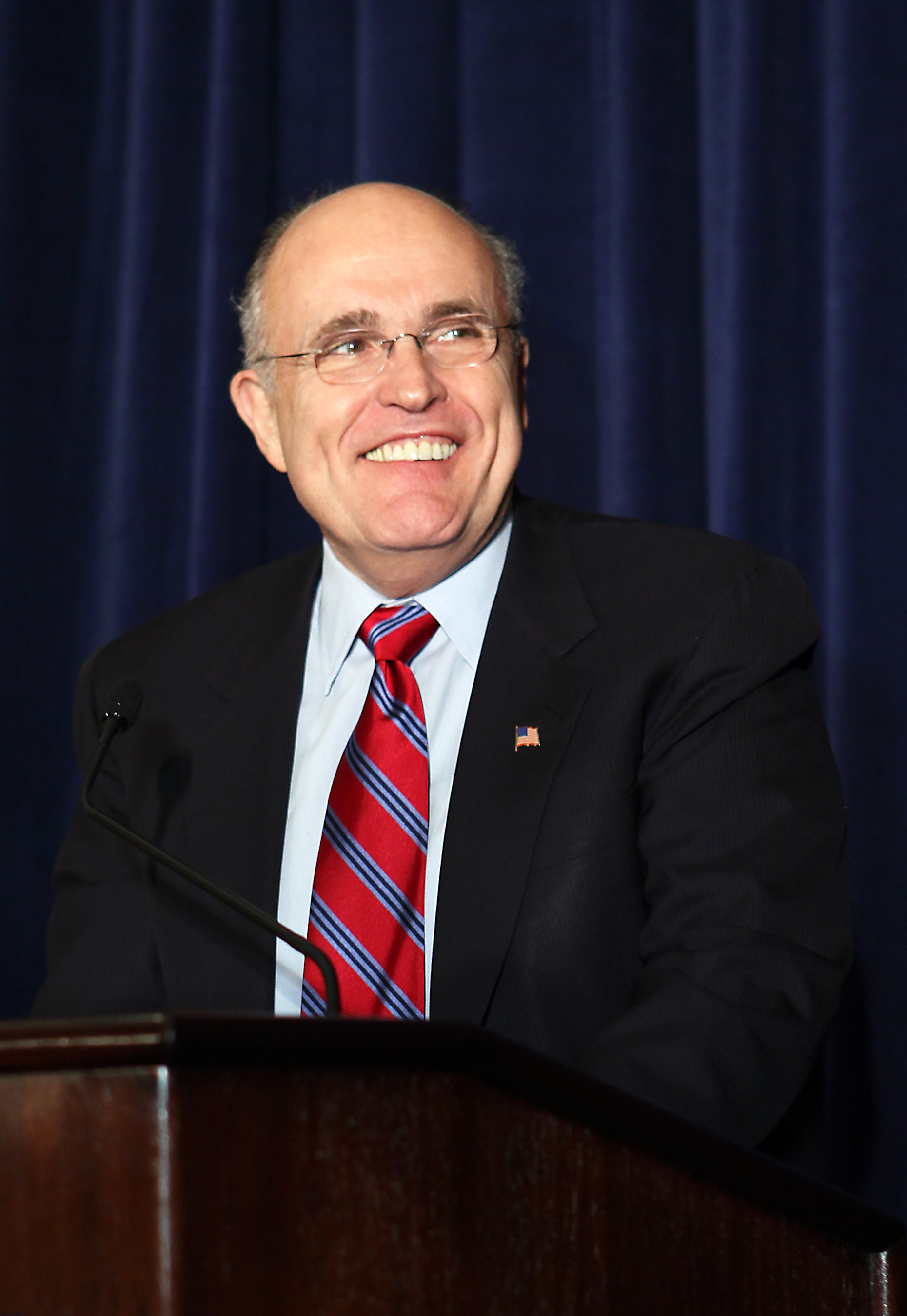
Former mayor of New York Rudy Giuliani in 2009

Current

- Dewey F. Bartlett Jr., 39th mayor of Tulsa
- Mary Hawkins Butler, mayor of Madison, Mississippi
- Gabriel Campana, mayor of Williamsport, Pennsylvania
- Lenny Curry, mayor of Jacksonville
- Ed Mangano, 8th Nassau County executive
- Jean Stothert, 51st mayor of Omaha

Former

- Greg Edwards, 5th Chautauqua County executive (2006–13)
- Charles Evers, mayor of Fayette, Mississippi (1969–81, 1985–89)
- Drew Ferguson, mayor of West Point, Georgia, 2016 Republican nominee for Georgia's 3rd congressional district
- Rudy Giuliani, 107th mayor of New York City (1994–2001)
- Tom Leppert, 60th mayor of Dallas, Texas (2007–11)
- Rick Mystrom, mayor of Anchorage (1994–2000)

=== Municipal executive officials ===
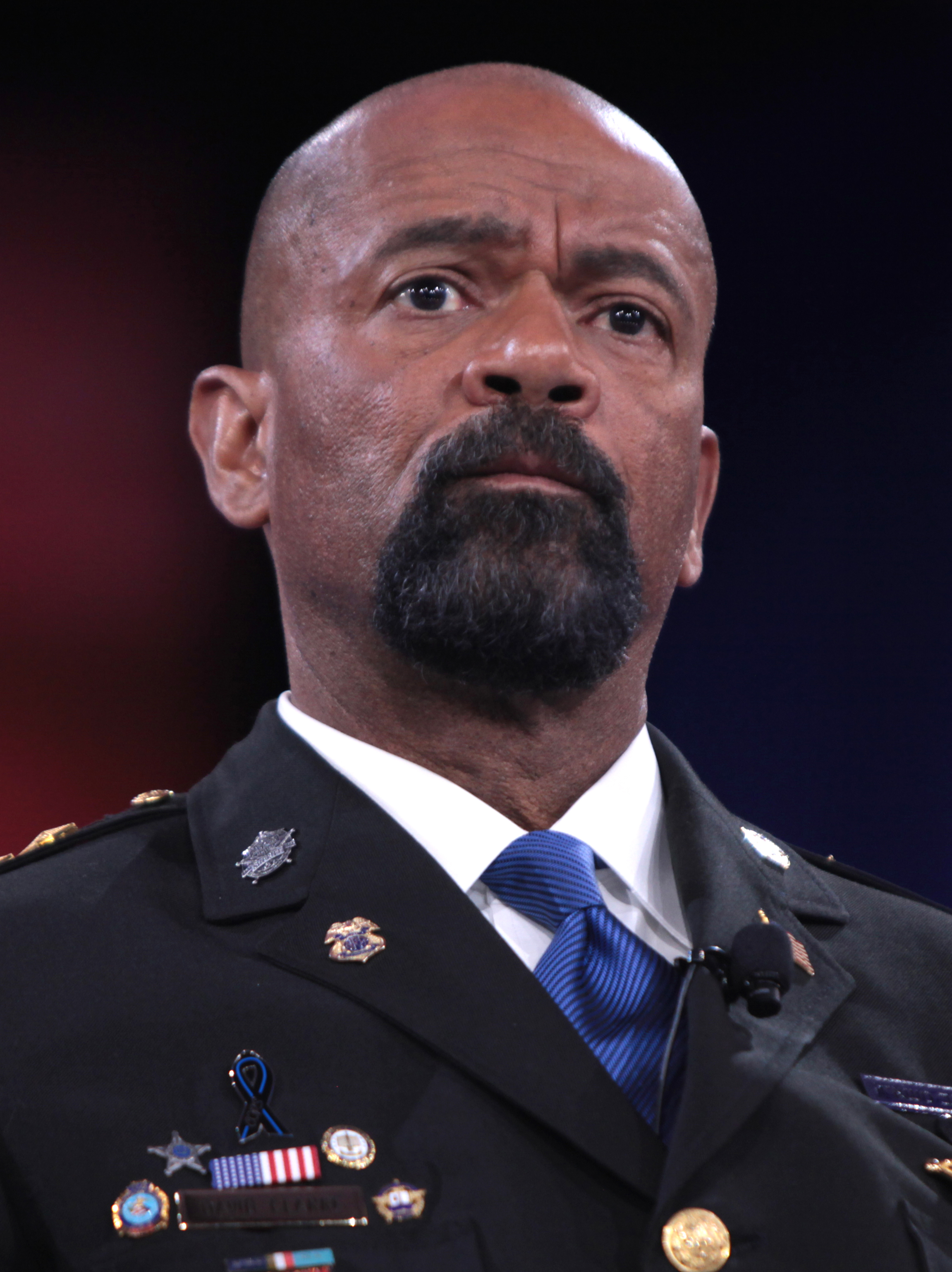
Sheriff David Clarke in 2016

Current

- Joe Arpaio, sheriff of Maricopa County
- Rob Astorino, Westchester County executive, 2014 Republican nominee for Governor of New York
- Paul Babeu, sheriff of Pinal County
- David A. Clarke Jr., sheriff of Milwaukee County
- James M. Cummings, sheriff of Barnstable County
- Ed Day, Rockland County executive
- Greg Hartmann, member of the three-member board of commissioners in Hamilton County, Ohio
- Chuck Jenkins, sheriff of Frederick County
- Peggy Littleton, El Paso County commissioner
- Dick Monteith, chairman of the Stanislaus County Board of Supervisors
- Michelle Park Steel, member of the Orange County Board of Supervisors
- Corey Stewart, chairman of the Prince William Board of County Supervisors
- Carolyn Bunny Welsh, Chester County sheriff

=== Municipal legislators ===
Current

- Joseph Borelli, council member for the 51st District in the New York City Council, minority whip

Former

- Vincent M. Ignizio, council member for the 51st District in the New York City Council
- Andrew Stein, 22nd borough president of Manhattan (1978–85) and New York City Council president (1986–94) (Democratic)

== Retired U.S. military personnel ==
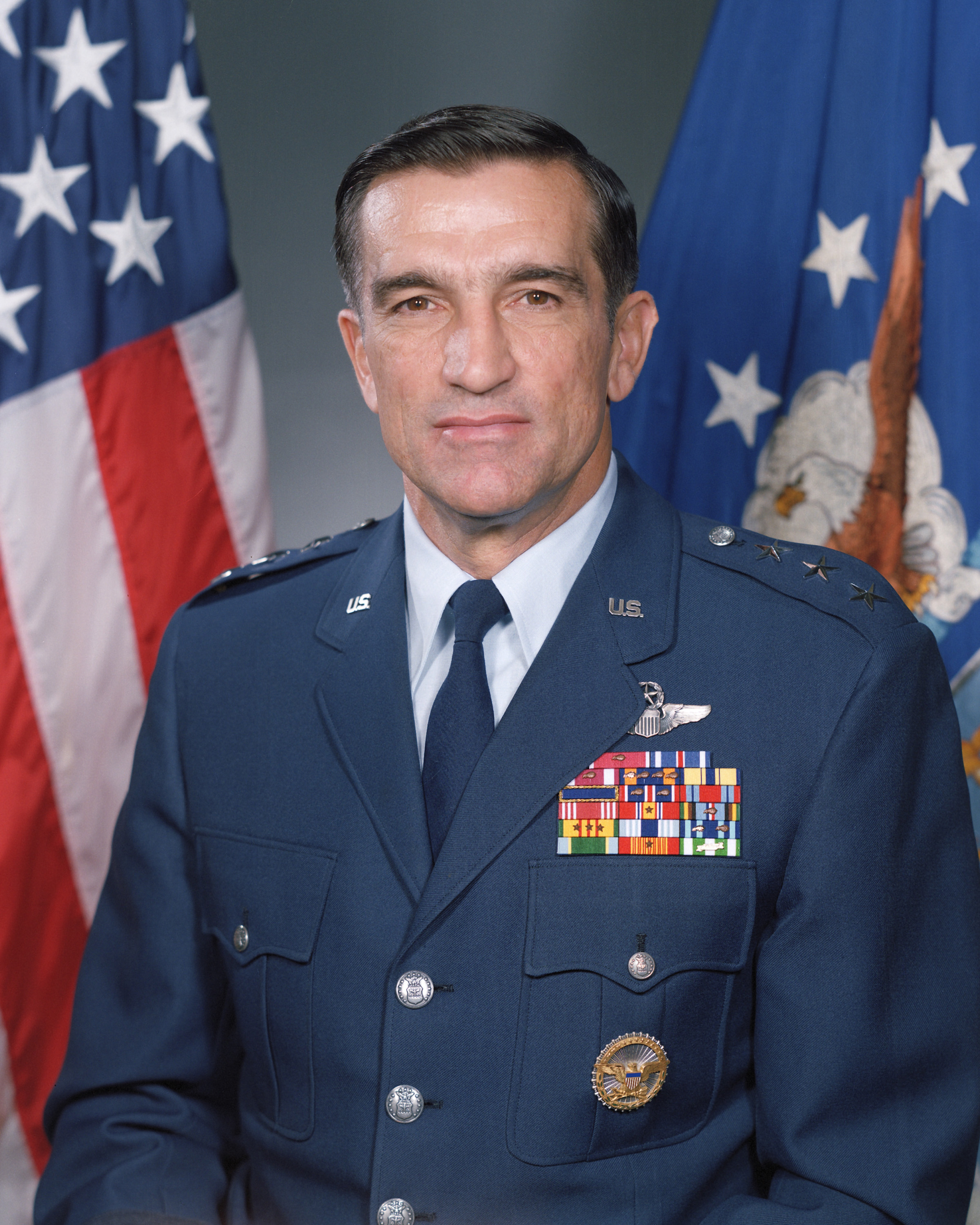
General Robert C. Oaks in 1986

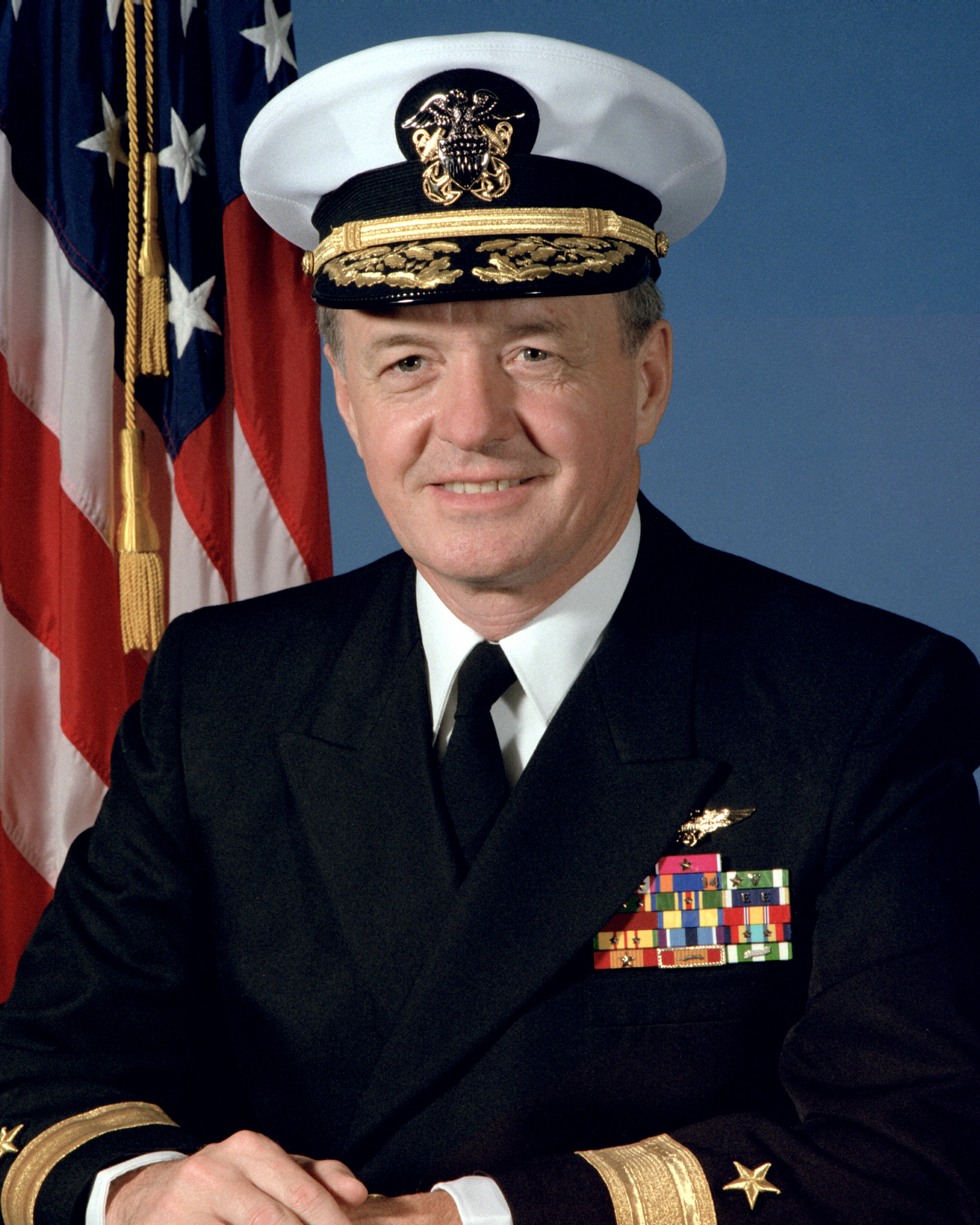
Vice Admiral Jerry L. Unruh in 1988

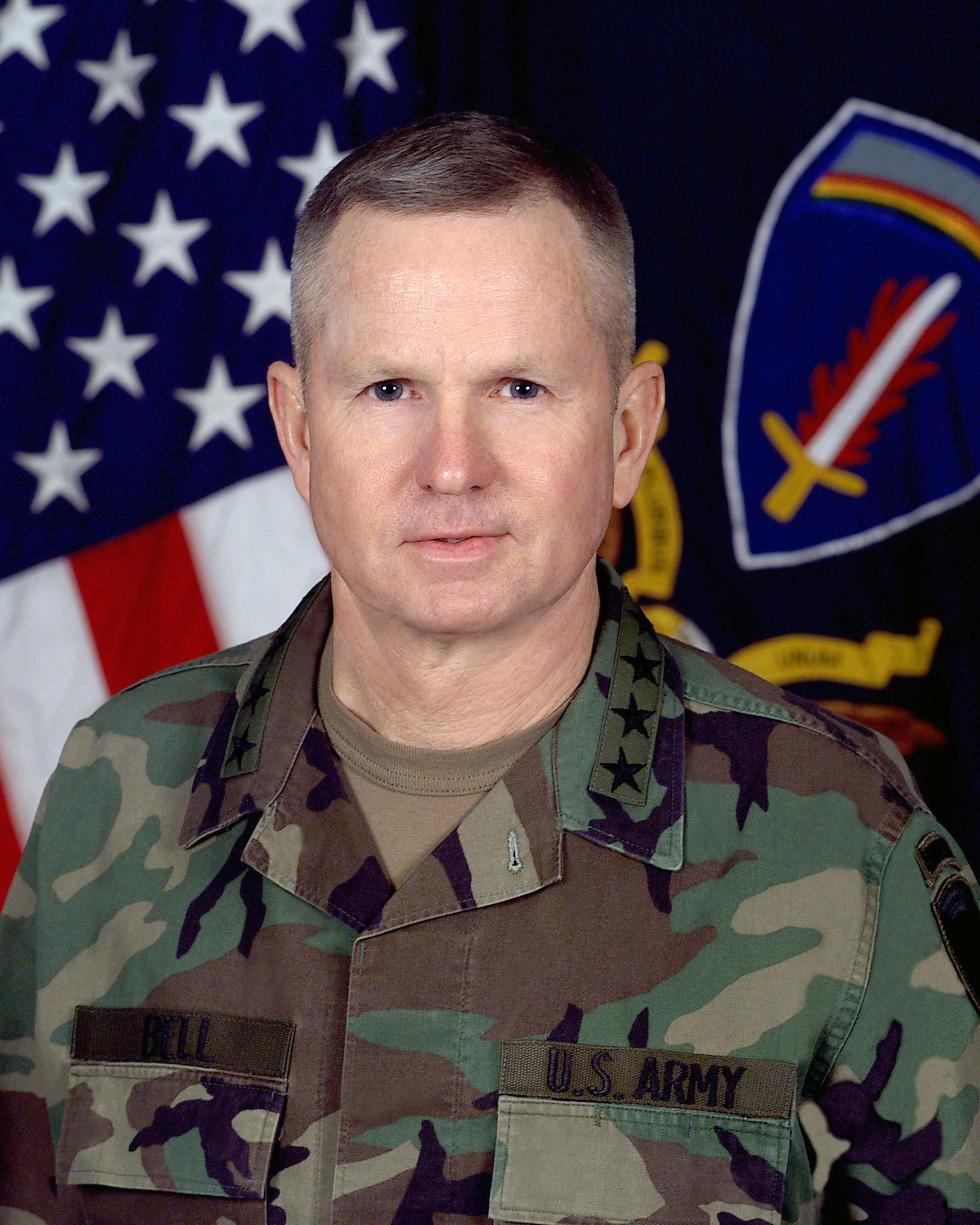
General Burwell B. Bell III in 2011

=== Retired U.S. Air Force personnel ===
- Alfred G. Hansen, general, commander of Air Force Logistics Command (COMAFLC) (1987–89)
- John L. Hudson, lieutenant general
- Timothy A. Kinnan, lieutenant general
- Thomas McInerney, lieutenant general
- Robert C. Oaks, general, commander of Air Training Command, commander of the U.S. Air Forces in Europe (1986–90)
- Richard Secord, major general
- Leo K. Thorsness, colonel, Medal of Honor recipient
- William E. Thurman, lieutenant general

=== Retired U.S. Army personnel ===
- Bennie G. Adkins, command sergeant major, Medal of Honor recipient
- Burwell B. Bell III, general
- Patrick Henry Brady, major general
- Bruce P. Crandall, colonel, Medal of Honor recipient
- Sammy L. Davis, sergeant, Medal of Honor recipient
- Michael John Fitzmaurice, specialist four, Medal of Honor recipient
- Michael Flynn, former lieutenant general, former director of the Defense Intelligence Agency
- Harold A. Fritz, colonel, Medal of Honor recipient
- Jay Garner, lieutenant general
- James F. Linzey, chaplain, major
- Walter Joseph Marm Jr., colonel, Medal of Honor recipient
- Bert Mizusawa, major general, deputy director for strategic initiatives, Joint Chiefs of Staff
- Robert Martin Patterson, command sergeant major, Medal of Honor recipient
- Leroy Petry, master sergeant, Medal of Honor recipient
- Ronald E. Rosser, sergeant first class, Medal of Honor recipient
- Crosbie E. Saint, general, commander in chief of U.S. Army Europe, commander, Central Army Group (1988–92)
- Richard Scholtes, major general
- Sidney Shachnow, major general, Holocaust survivor
- Ken Stumpf, sergeant major, Medal of Honor recipient
- John B. Sylvester, lieutenant general
- James Allen Taylor, major, Medal of Honor recipient
- Paul E. Vallely, major general, 351st Civil Affairs commander (1982–86), deputy commanding general, Pacific Command, military committee chairman for the Center for Security Policy

=== Retired U.S. Coast Guard personnel ===
- Edward Nelson Jr., rear admiral
- Donald C. Thompson, vice admiral
- Howard Thorsen, vice admiral
- Theodore J. Wojnar, rear admiral

=== Retired U.S. Marine Corps personnel ===
- Fleming Begaye Sr., Navajo code talker
- Mark Bircher, brigadier general
- Wesley L. Fox, colonel, Medal of Honor recipient
- James E. Livingston, major general
- Robert Magnus, general, assistant commandant of the Marine Corps
- Robert J. Modrzejewski, colonel, Medal of Honor recipient
- Robert E. Simanek, private first class, Medal of Honor recipient
- Jay Vargas, colonel, Medal of Honor recipient
- Hershel W. Williams, chief warrant officer 4, Medal of Honor recipient

=== Retired U.S. Navy personnel ===
- James J. Carey, rear admiral
- James H. Flatley III, rear admiral
- Carl Higbie, former Navy SEAL and author
- Robert R. Ingram, hospital corpsman, Medal of Honor recipient
- J. Adrian Jackson, rear admiral
- Jerome L. Johnson, admiral, vice chief of naval operations (1990–92)
- Richard B. Landolt, admiral
- Marcus Luttrell, former Navy SEAL and TV host
- James Lyons, admiral
- William J. McDaniel, rear admiral
- Robert F. Schoultz, vice admiral
- Robert J. Spane, vice admiral
- Michael E. Thornton, lieutenant, Medal of Honor recipient
- John B. Totushek, vice admiral
- Jerry L. Unruh, vice admiral, commander of the Third Fleet (1992–94)

== International political figures ==
=== Heads of state and government ===
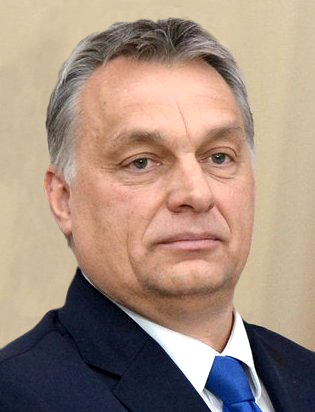
Hungarian prime minister Viktor Orbán in 2016

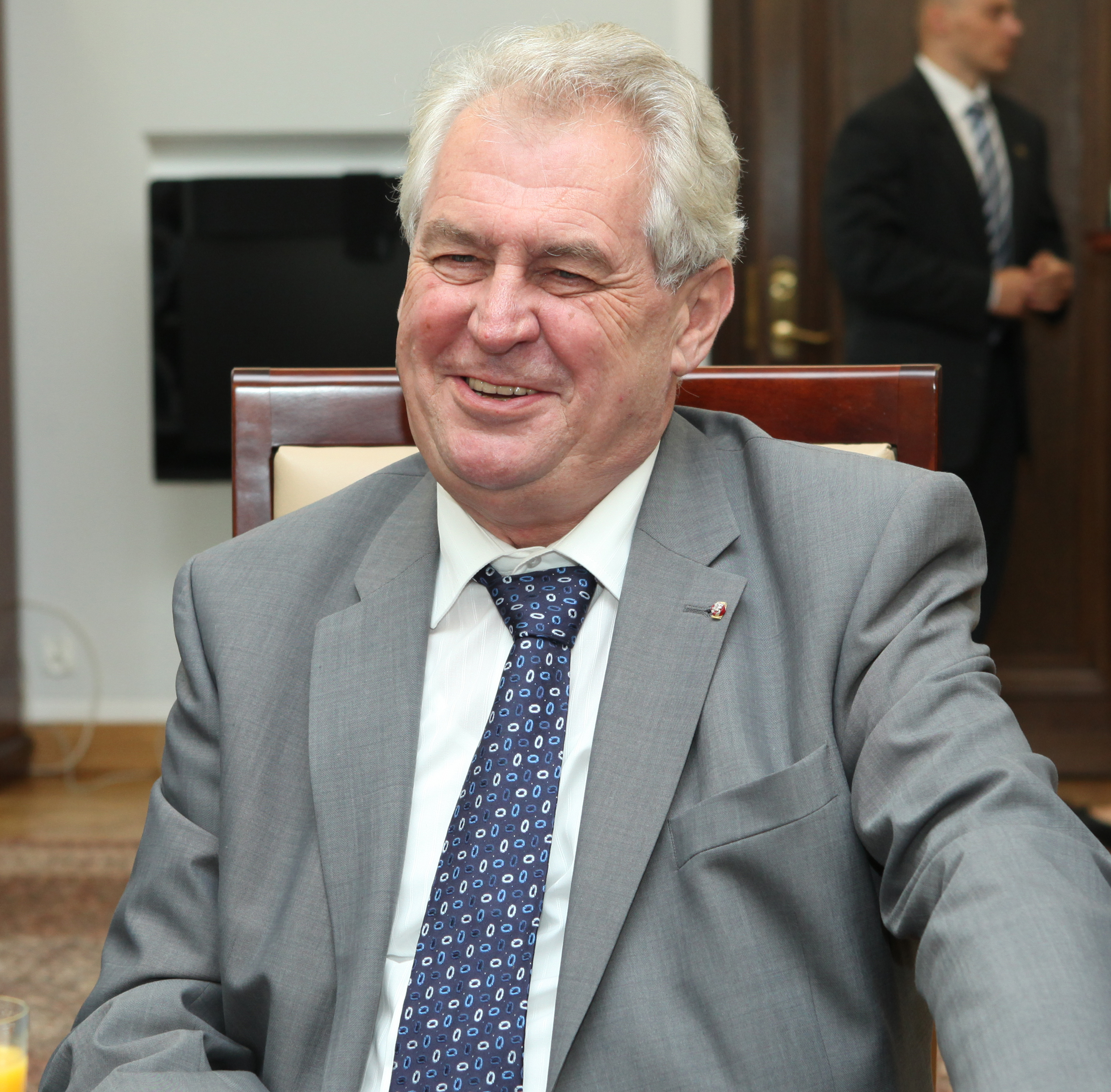
Czech President Miloš Zeman in 2013

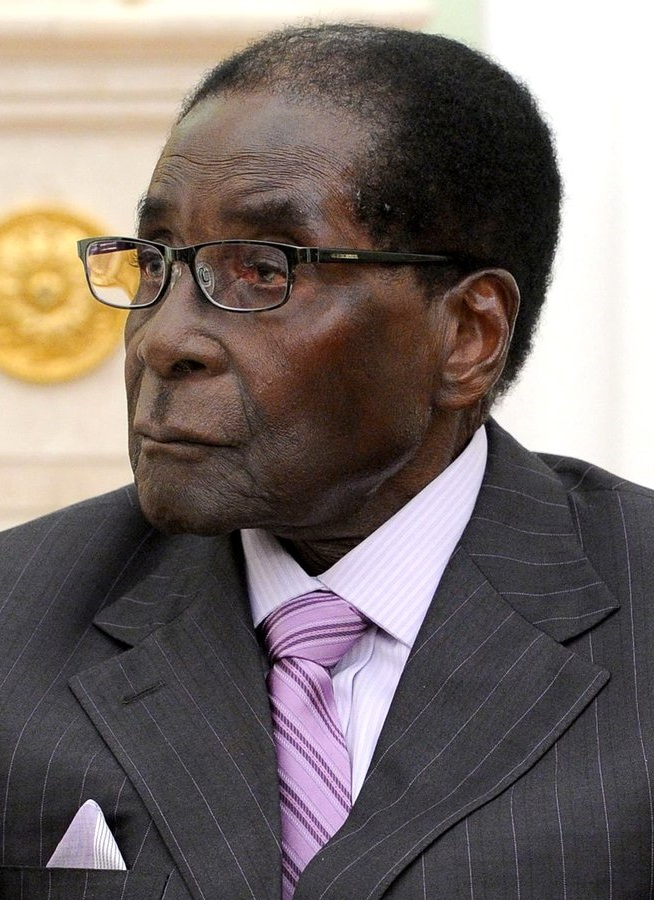
Zimbabwean President Robert Mugabe in 2016

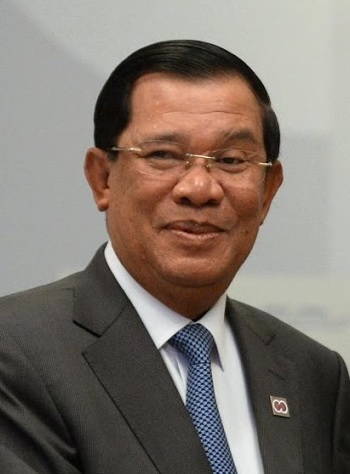
Cambodian prime minister Hun Sen in 2016

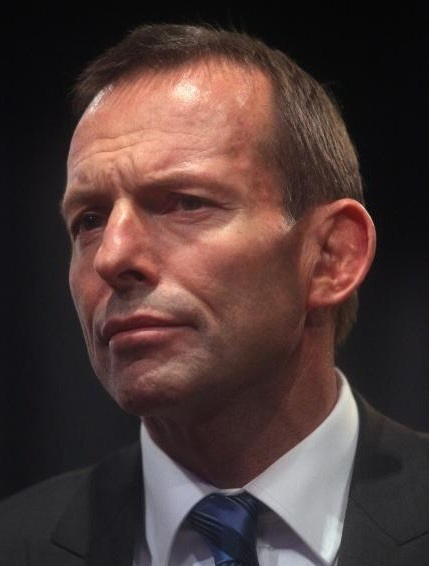
Former Australian PM Tony Abbott in 2010

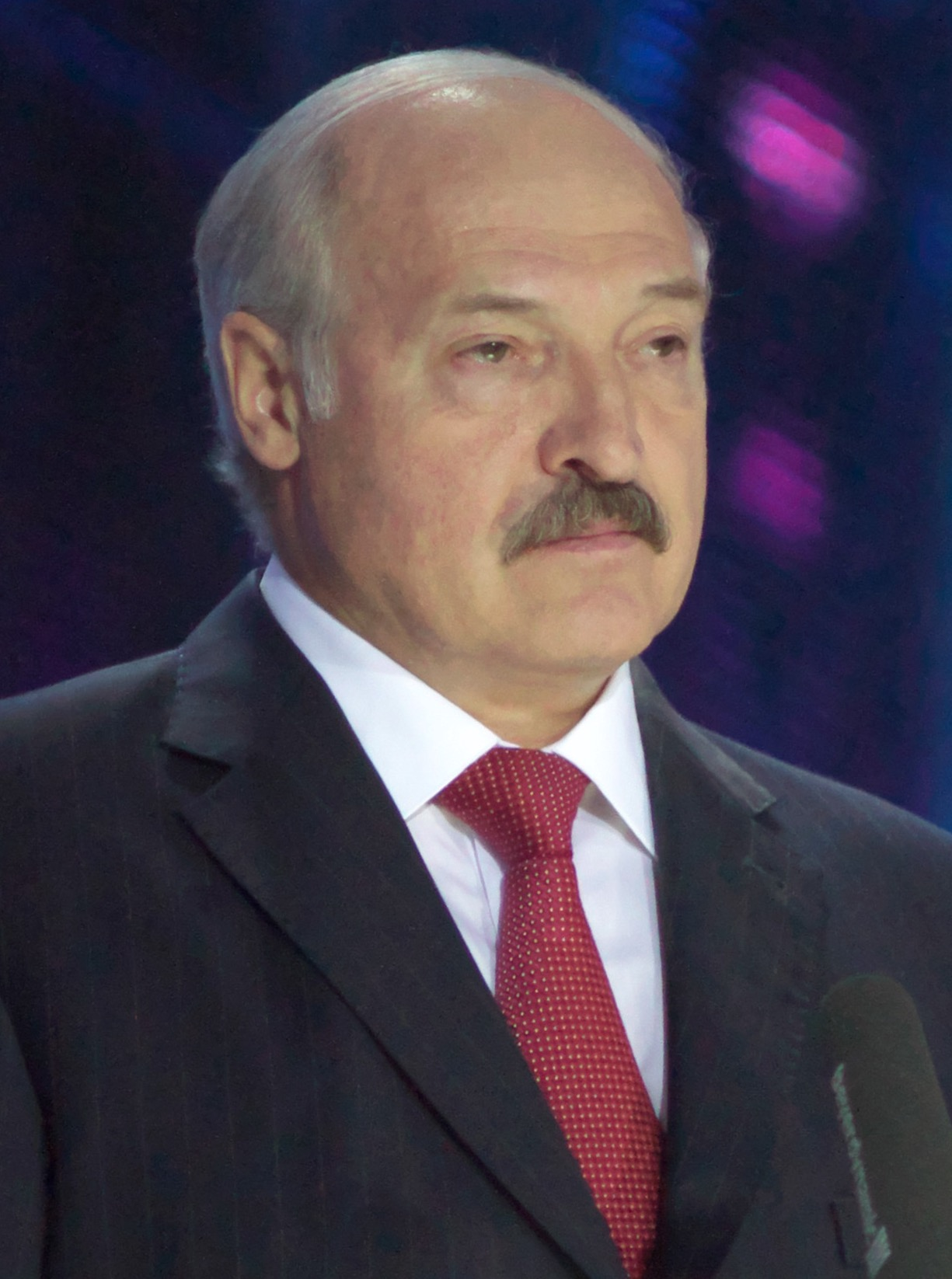
Belarusian president Alexander Lukashenko in 2015

==== Current ====
- Hun Sen, prime minister of Cambodia (1985–2023), president of the Cambodian People's Party (2015–present)
- Alexander Lukashenko, president of Belarus (1994–present), chairman of the All-Belarusian People's Assembly (2024–present), chairman of the Supreme State Council of the Union State (2000–present), and member of the Supreme Council of Belarus (1991–1994) (Independent)
- Robert Mugabe, president of Zimbabwe (1987–2017), prime minister of Zimbabwe (1980–1987), president of ZANU–PF (1980–2017)
- Viktor Orbán, prime minister of Hungary (1998–2002, 2010–present), president of Fidesz (1993–2000, 2003–present)
- Miloš Zeman, 3rd president of the Czech Republic (2013–2023), member of the Party of Civic Rights (2009–present), former leader of the Social Democratic Party (1993–2001)

==== Former ====
- Tony Abbott, former prime minister of Australia (2013–2015) and former leader of the Liberal Party (2009–2015)
- Edgar Savisaar, former acting prime minister of Estonia (1990–92) and leader of the center-left Estonian Centre Party (1991–2016)

=== Other executive officials ===
- Petr Bendl, former minister of agriculture (2011–2013) and former minister of transport (Civic Democratic Party)
- Guillermo Moreno, Secretary of Domestic Trade of Argentina (2006–2013) (Principles and Values)
- Andrew Peacock, former Australian minister for industry and commerce (1982–1983), former minister for industrial relations (1980–1981), former minister for foreign affairs (1975–1980), former minister for the environment (1975), former minister for external territories (1972), former minister for defence and minister for the Army (1969–1971) and former leader of the Liberal Party (1983–1985, 1989–1990)
- David Richards, Baron Richards of Herstmonceux, former chief of the Defence Staff of the British Armed Forces
- Vojislav Šešelj, former deputy prime minister (1998–2000) and founder and president of the Serbian Radical Party (1991–present)
- Cyril Svoboda, former deputy prime minister (2002–2004) and former leader of the KDU-ČSL (2001–2003, 2009–2010)
- Subramanian Swamy, former minister of commerce and industry (1990–91) (Bharatiya Janata Party)

=== Members of national and supranational parliaments ===
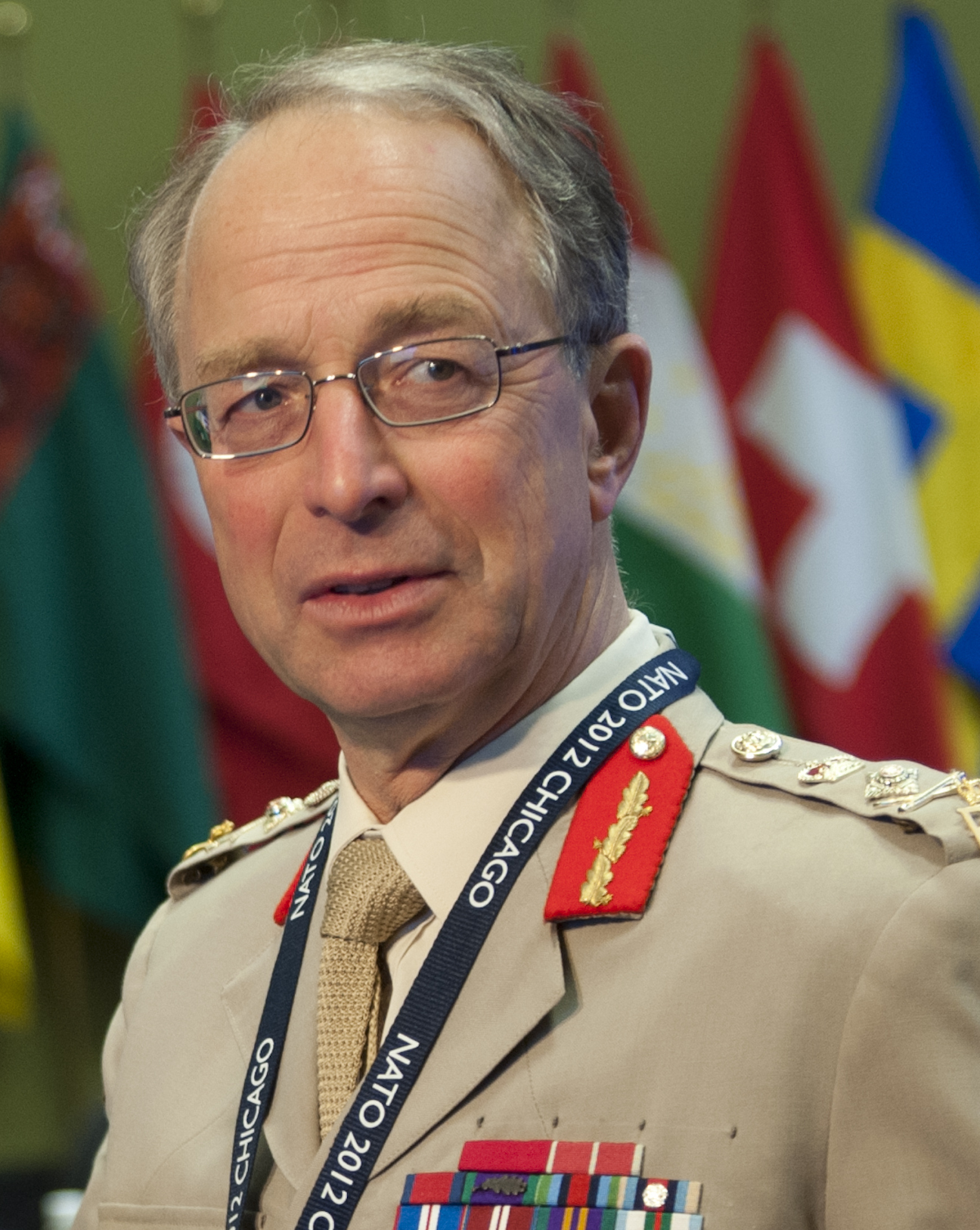
Gen. Sir David Richards at the NATO Summit in Chicago, Illinois, in 2012.

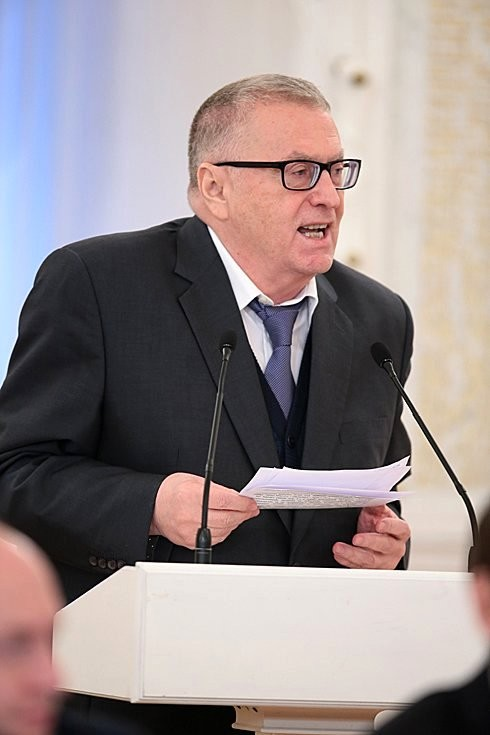
Vladimir Zhirinovsky in 2013

Australia

- Cory Bernardi, Australian politician, senator and member of the Liberal Party
- George Christensen, Australian politician, MP, and member of the National Party
- Malcolm Roberts, Australian politician, senator and member of One Nation Party

Belgium

- Filip Dewinter, Belgian politician, Flemish MP and member of the Flemish nationalist Vlaams Belang party

Canada

- Ben Lobb, Canadian politician, MP and member of the Conservative Party of Canada

Czech Republic

- Marie Benešová, Czech politician, MP, and member of the ČSSD
- Jana Černochová, Czech politician, MP, and member of the Civic Democratic Party
- Miroslava Němcová, Czech politician, MP, and member of the Civic Democratic Party
- Zdeněk Ondráček, Czech politician, MP, and member of the Communist Party of Bohemia and Moravia

Denmark

- Kenneth Kristensen Berth, Danish politician, MP, and member of the national conservative Danish People's Party

France

- Gilbert Collard, French politician, MP, member of the Rassemblement bleu Marine coalition
- Marion Maréchal-Le Pen, French politician, MP, and member of the Front National
- Jean-Frédéric Poisson, French politician, MP, and president of the conservative Christian Democratic Party
- David Rachline, French politician, senator, mayor of Fréjus, and member of the nationalist Front National

Greece

- Ilias Panagiotaros, Greek politician, MP, and member of the far-right Golden Dawn party

Israel

- Oren Hazan, Israeli politician, MK, and member of Likud

Kenya

- Mike Sonko, Kenyan politician, senator and member of The National Alliance

Norway

- Ulf Leirstein, Norwegian politician, MP, and member of the conservative-liberal Progress Party

Russia

- Aleksey Pushkov, Russian politician, MP, head of the Foreign Affairs Committee in the State Duma, and member of United Russia
- Robert Schlegel, member of the Russian State Duma, member of United Russia
- Vladimir Zhirinovsky, Russian politician, MP, vice chairman of the State Duma, and leader of the far-right Liberal Democratic Party of Russia (1989–2022)

Slovakia

- Richard Sulík, Slovak politician, MEÞ, and leader of the libertarian Freedom and Solidarity

Sweden

- Mikael Jansson, Swedish politician, MP and defense spokesman for the Sweden Democrats
- Mattias Bäckström Johansson, Swedish politician, MP, deputy leader of the Sweden Democrats in the Riksdag

United Kingdom

- Philip Davies, British politician, MP, and member of the Conservative Party
- Michael Fabricant, British politician, MP, and member of the Conservative Party
- Jacob Rees-Mogg, British politician, MP, and member of the Conservative Party

=== Regional ministers, legislators, and party leaders ===
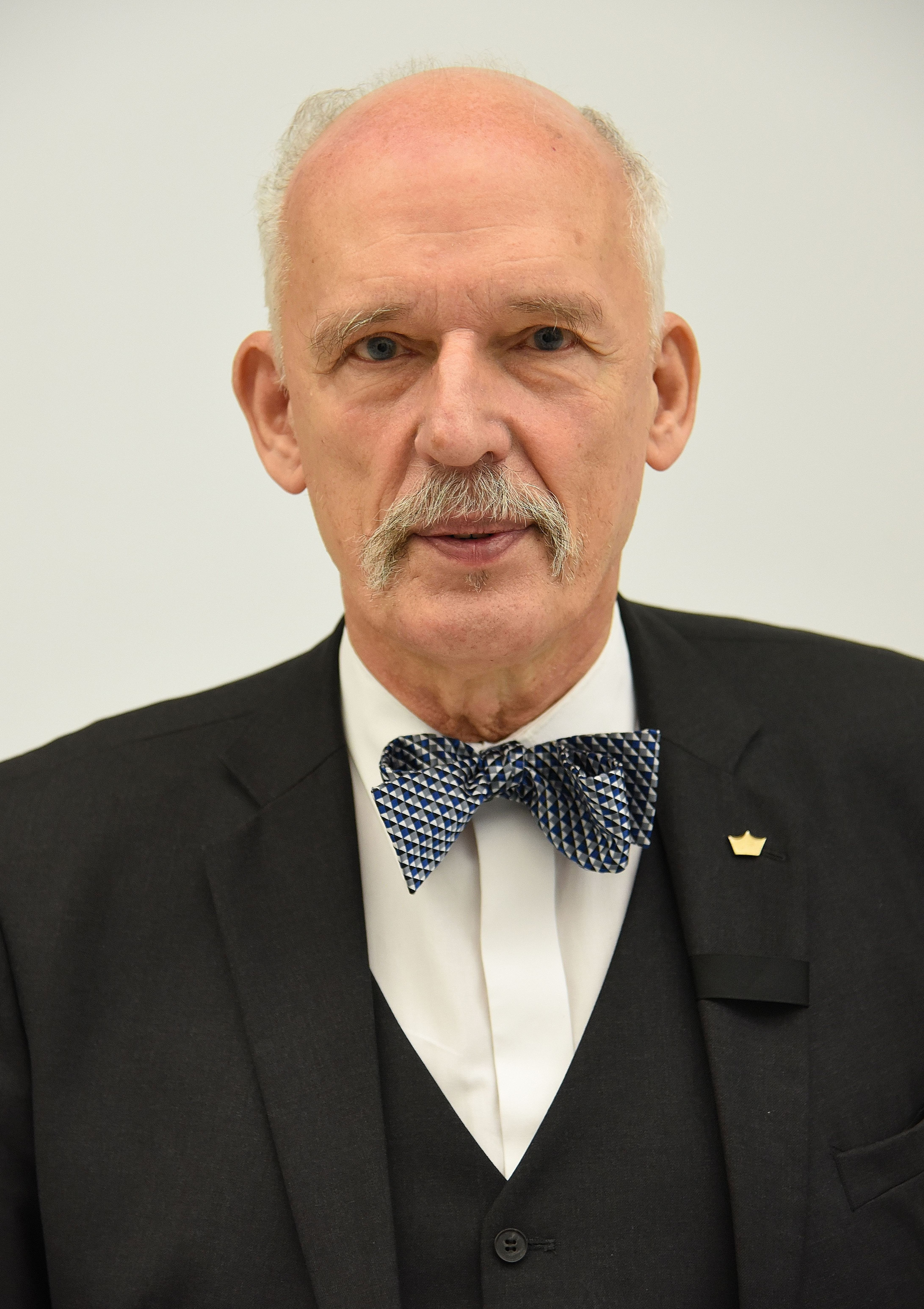
Janusz Korwin-Mikke in 2016

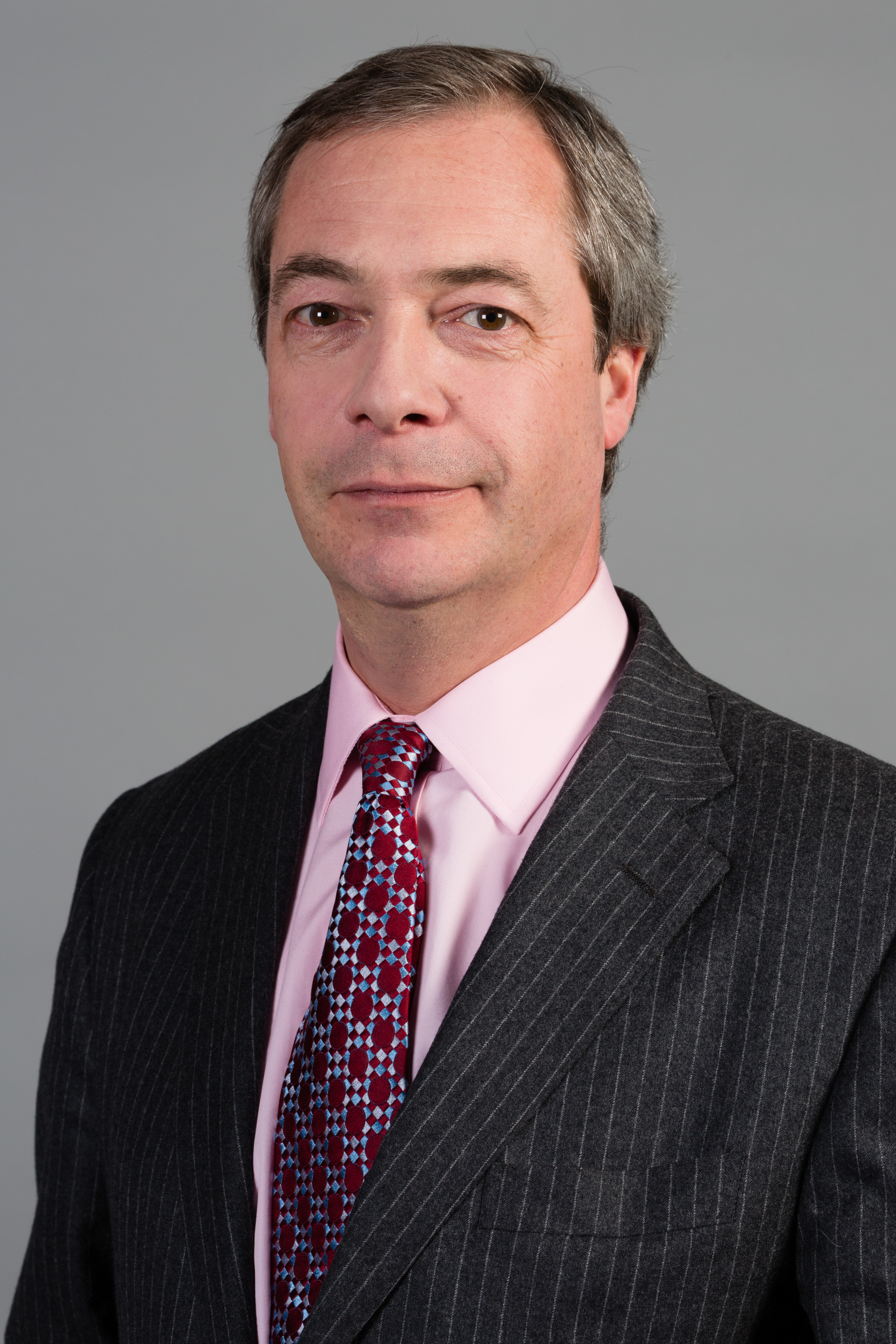
Nigel Farage in 2014

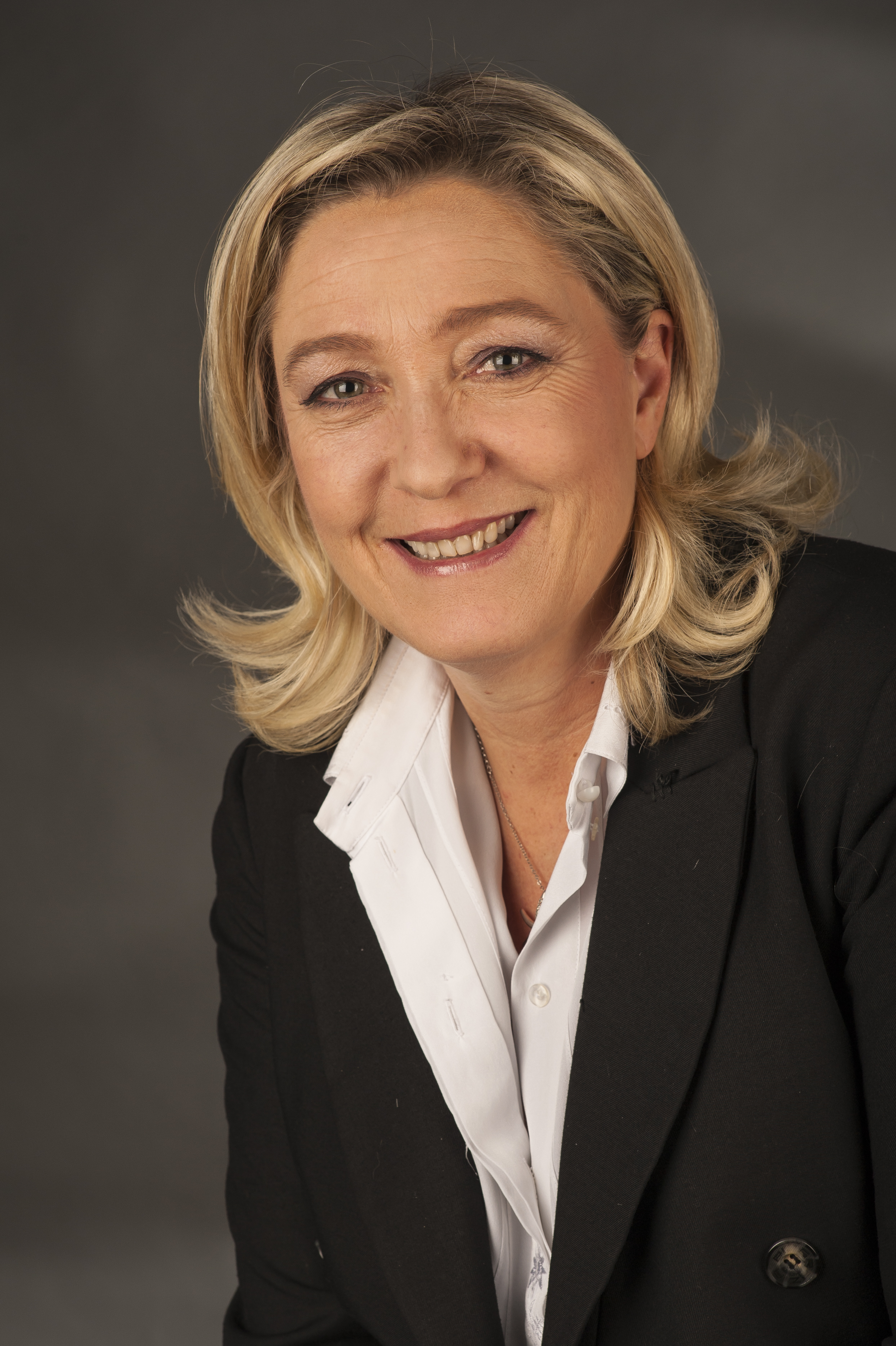
French party leader and MEP Marine Le Pen in 2014

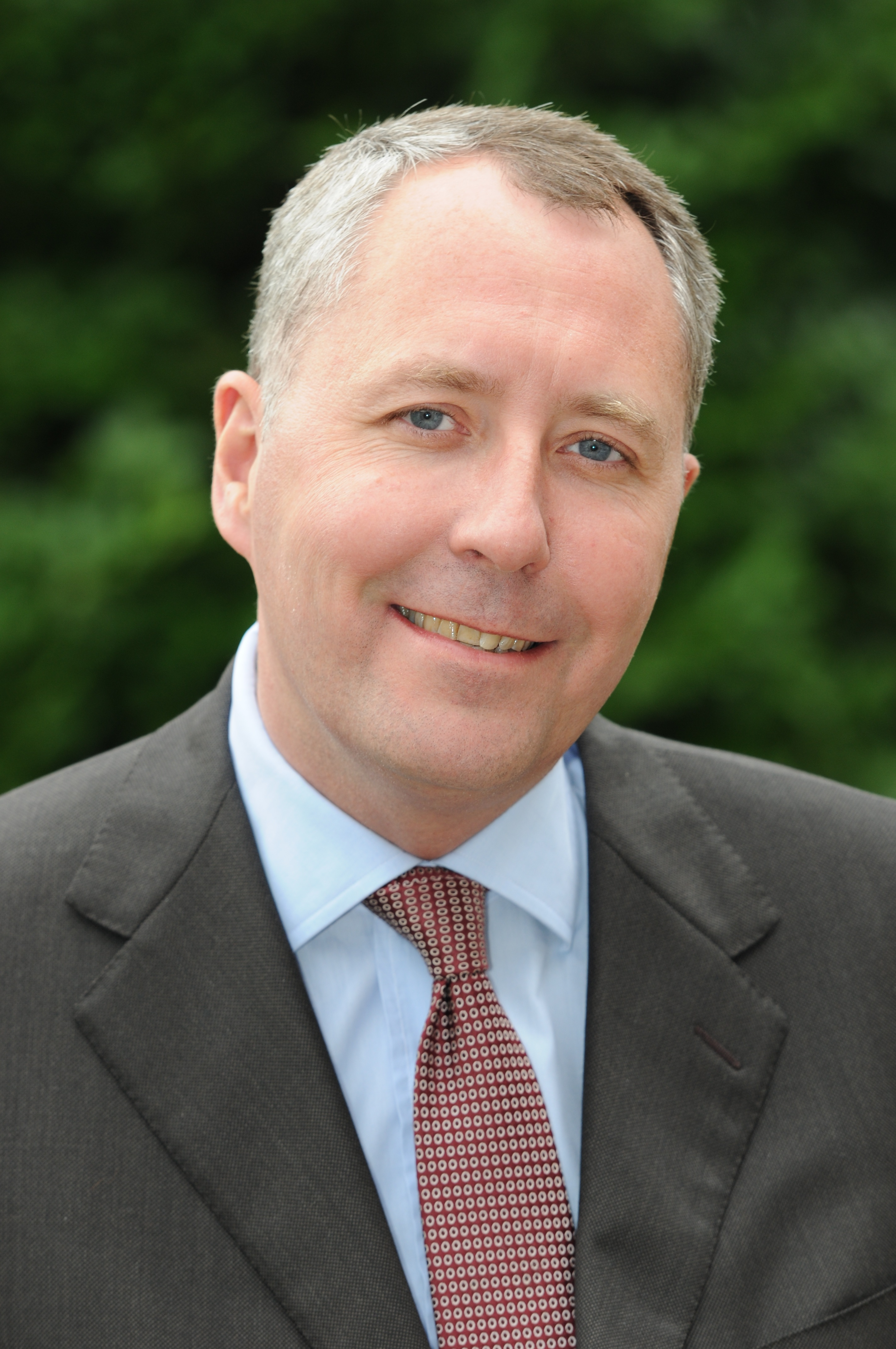
Mischaël Modrikamen in 2011

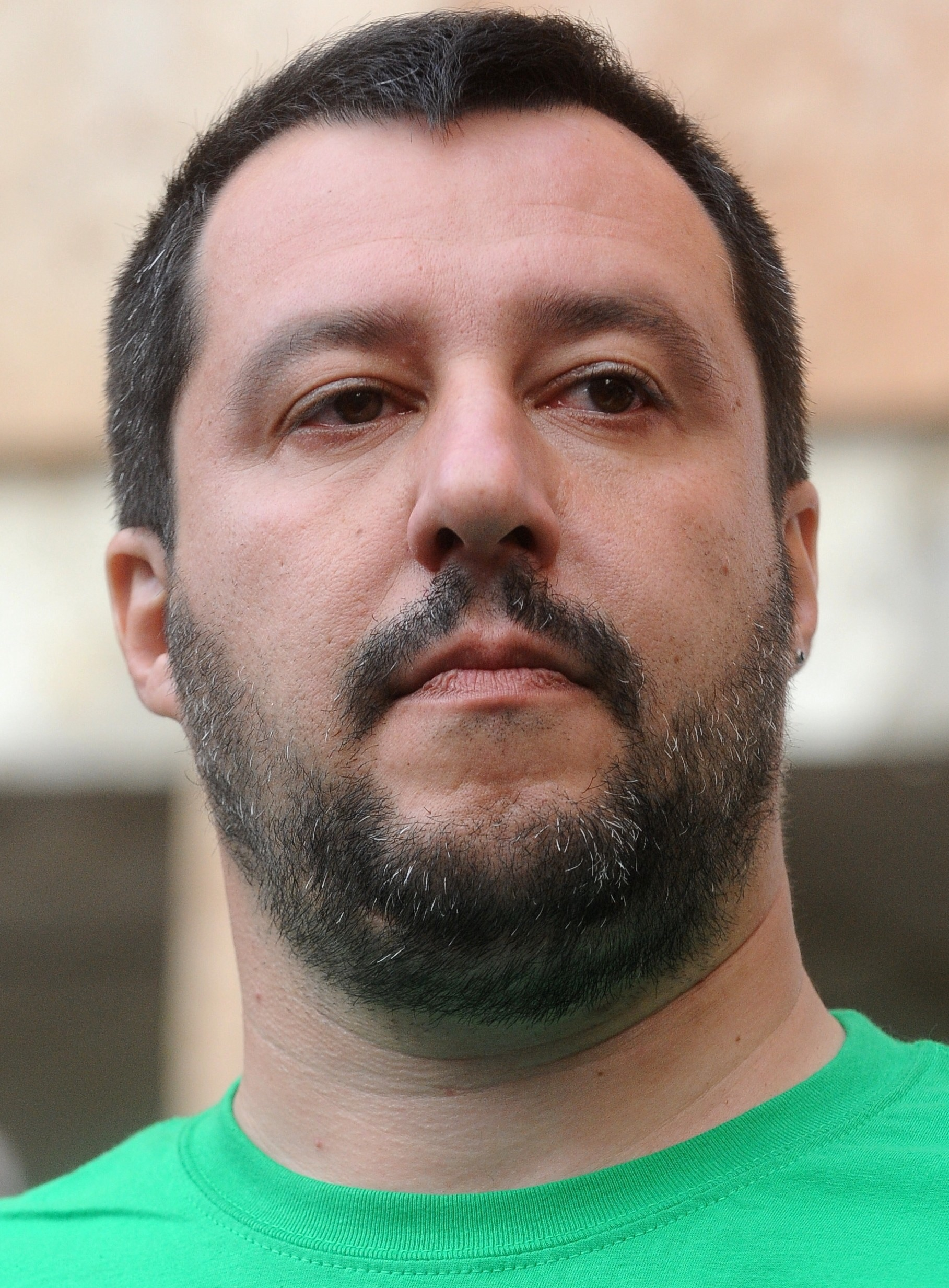
Matteo Salvini in 2015

Australia

- Pauline Hanson, Australian politician, senator, and leader of the One Nation Party (1997–2002, 2014–present)

Belgium

- Mischaël Modrikamen, Belgian politician and leader of the national conservative People's Party (2009–)
- Tom Van Grieken, Belgian politician, Flemish MP, and leader of the Flemish nationalist Vlaams Belang party (2014–)

Crimea

- Andrey Rostenko, Russian politician, mayor of Yalta, Crimea

Czech Republic

- Tomáš Hudeček, Czech politician, MP, and member of the ČSSD

Czech Republic

- Tomio Okamura, Czech politician and former Mayor of Prague

Estonia

- Mart Helme, Estonian politician, MP, former ambassador to Russia (1995–99), and chairman of the national conservative Conservative People's Party of Estonia (2013–)

France

- Marine Le Pen, French politician, MEP, and leader of the nationalist Front National (2011–)
- Henry de Lesquen, French politician, president of the Club de l'Horloge national conservative think tank, founder and president of the National Liberal Party (2016–), and 2017 presidential candidate
- Robert Ménard, French politician and independent Mayor of Béziers (supported by Front National)

Germany

- Frauke Petry, German politician and leader of the Alternative for Germany

Indonesia

- Setya Novanto, speaker of the House (2014–15, 2016–17) and leader of Golkar
- Fadli Zon, deputy speaker of the House (2014–present), member of Gerindra Party

Italy

- Matteo Salvini, Italian politician, MEP and leader of Lega Nord (2013–)
- Giovanni Toti, Italian politician, president of Liguria and member of Forza Italia

Morocco

- Hamid Chabat, Moroccan politician, MP, mayor of Fez, secretary-general of the conservative Istiqlal Party (2012–2017)

Netherlands

- Geert Wilders, Dutch politician, MP, leader of the Freedom Party

Poland

- Janusz Korwin-Mikke, Polish politician, MEP, and leader of Coalition for the Renewal of the Republic–Liberty and Hope

Sweden

- Jimmie Åkesson, Swedish politician, MP, and leader of the Sweden Democrats

Slovenia

- Andrej Šiško, leader of the Movement of United Slovenia

United Kingdom

- Nigel Farage, British politician, MEP and leader of the UK Independence Party

=== Former regional ministers, legislators, and party leaders ===
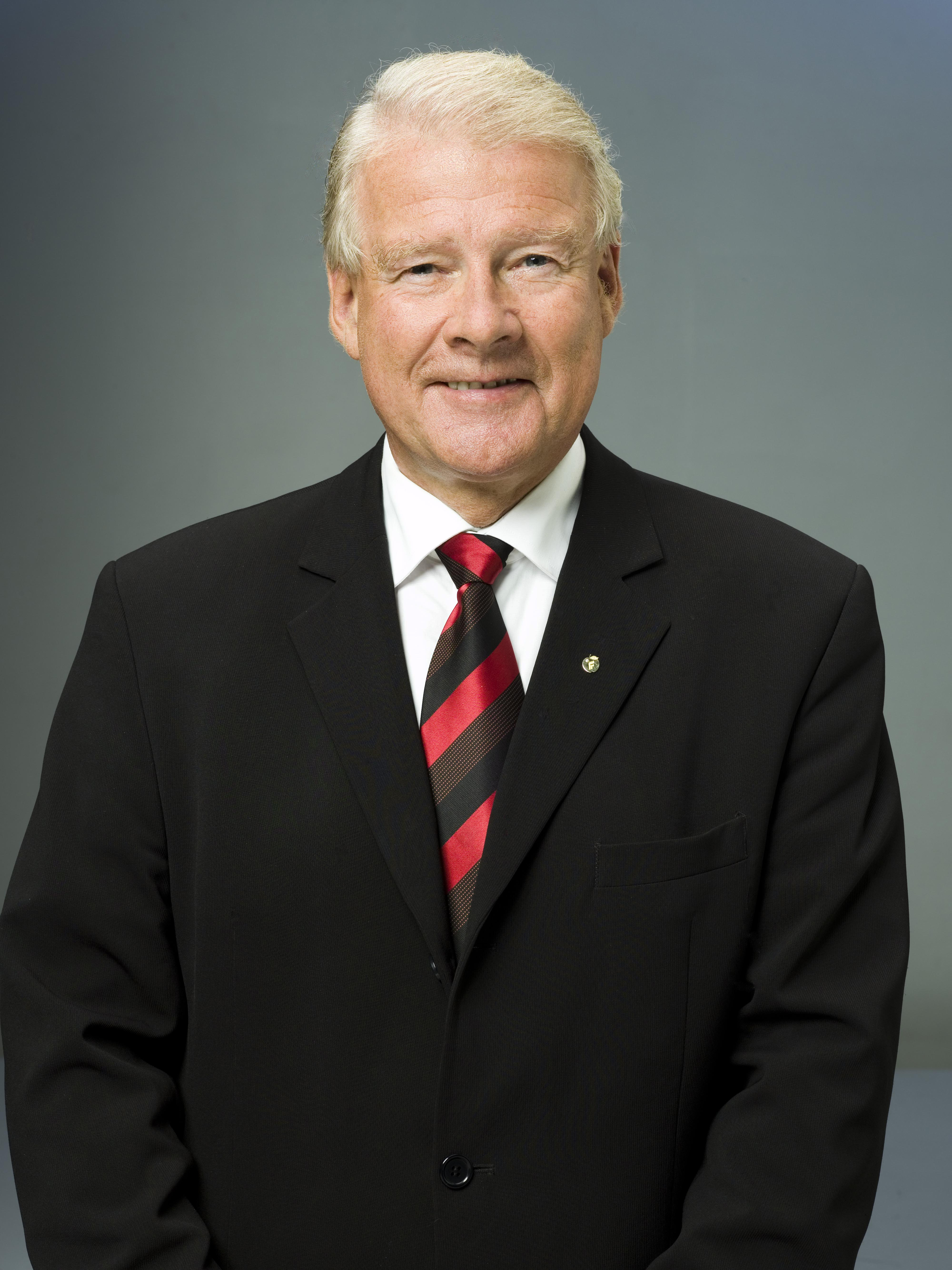
Carl I. Hagen in 2009

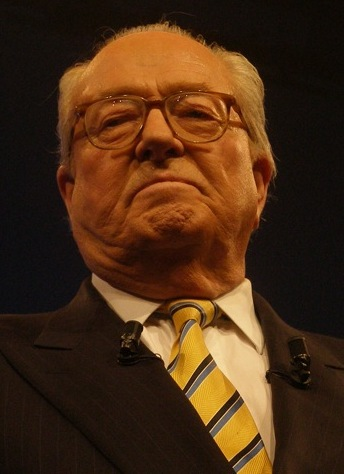
Jean-Marie Le Pen in 2007

Australia

- Ross Cameron, Australian politician and political commentator, former MP, member of the Liberal Party
- Mark Latham, Australian politician, former MP, former leader of the Australian Labor Party (2003–05), member of the Liberal Democratic Party, and author of Civilising Global Capital

Canada

- Doug Ford Jr., Canadian politician and businessman, premier of Ontario, member of the Progressive Conservative Party of Ontario, former Toronto city councillor, 2014 candidate for mayor of Toronto and brother of former Toronto Mayor Rob Ford
- Myron Thompson, former MP, member of the Conservative Party of Canada

Denmark

- Morten Uhrskov Jensen, Danish politician, leader of Danish Unity

France

- Jean-Marie Le Pen, French politician, MEP, founder and former leader of the nationalist Front National (1972–2011)

Israel

- Aryeh Eldad, Israeli politician, former MK, member of Otzma Yehudit

Norway

- Carl I. Hagen, Norwegian politician, former MP, former vice president of the Storting, and former leader of the conservative-liberal Progress Party (1978–2006)

Russia

- Sergey Markov, former member of the Russian State Duma (2006–2008), member of United Russia, president of the Institute of Political Studies

== Notable individuals ==
=== Commentators, writers, filmmakers, and columnists ===
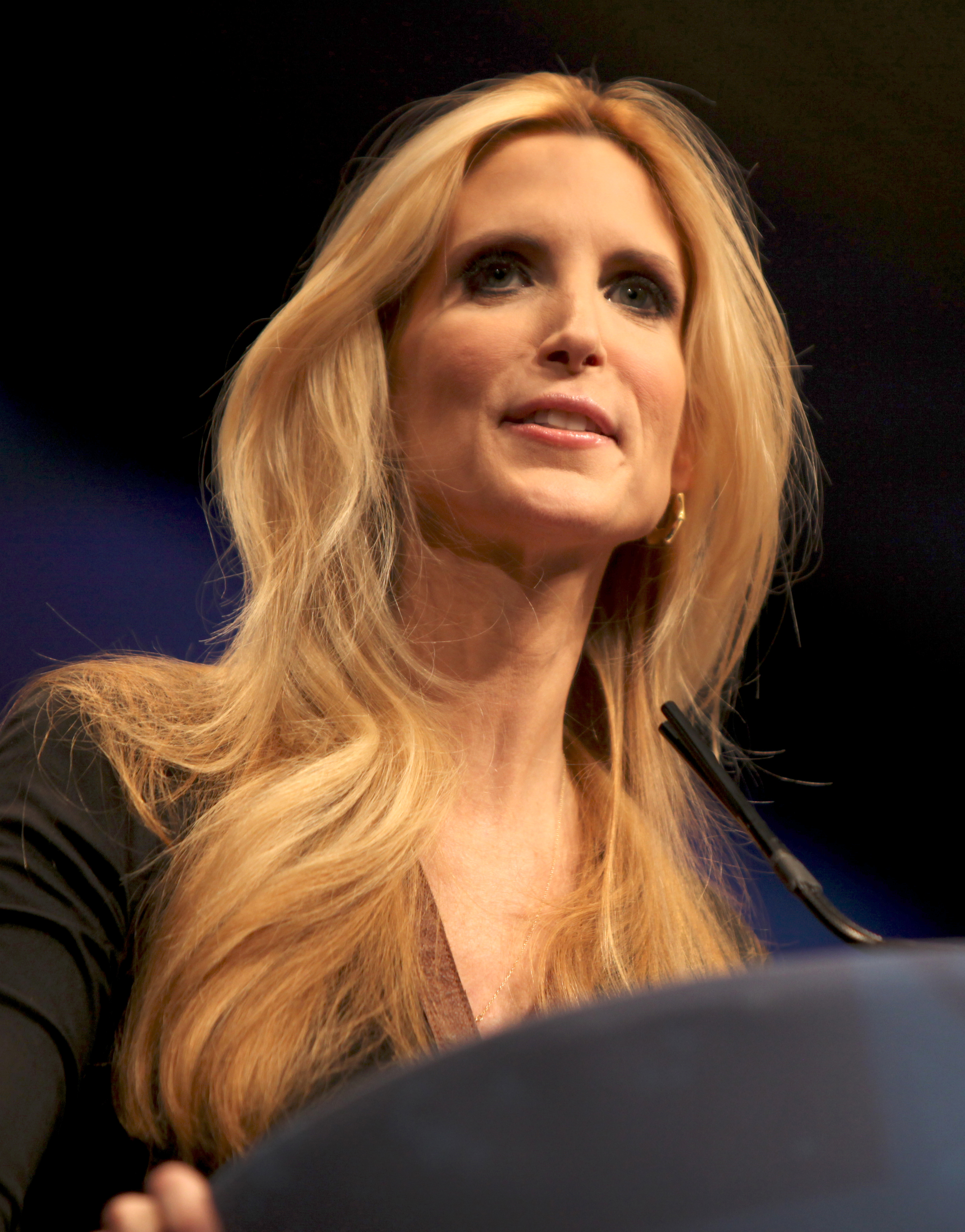
Political columnist Ann Coulter in 2012

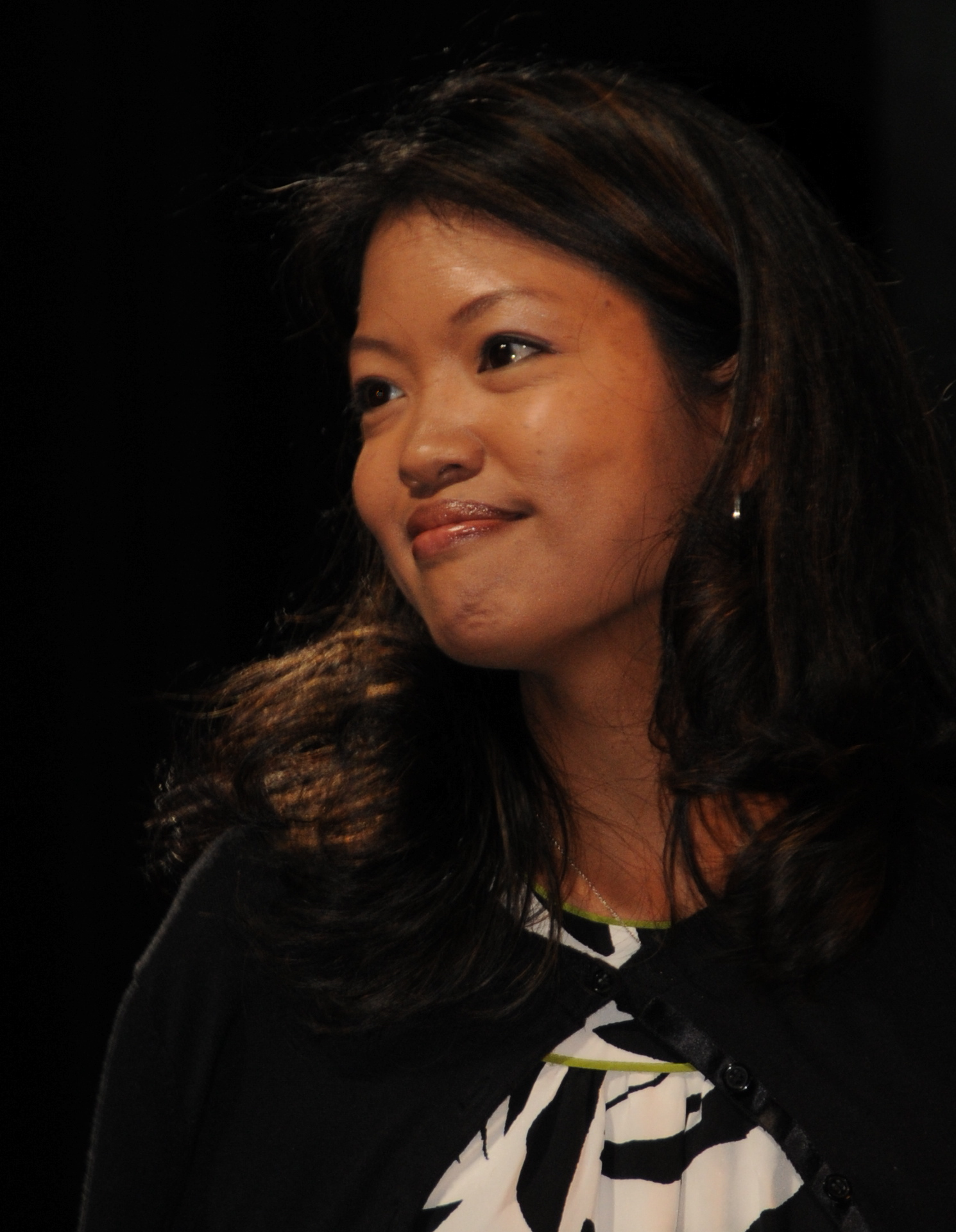
Journalist Michelle Malkin in 2008

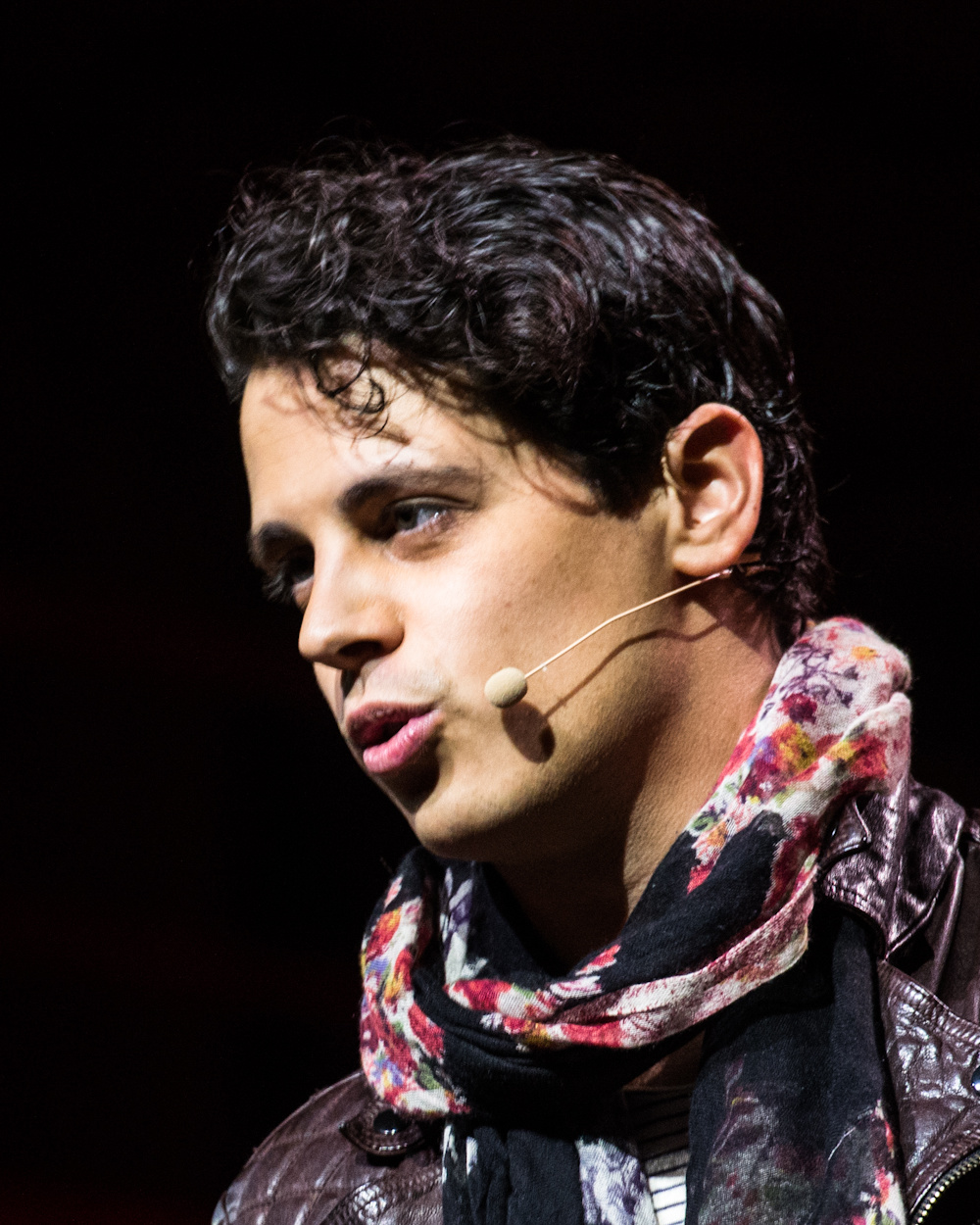
Journalist Milo Yiannopoulos in 2013

- Conrad Black, Canadian-born British former newspaper publisher, author and member of the House of Lords
- Ruthie Blum, journalist, columnist, former features editor of the Jerusalem Post, and current web editor at Algemeiner Journal
- Eric Bolling, commentator, co-host of The Five and Cashin' In on Fox News
- Andrew G. Bostom, author and expert on Islam
- Floyd Brown, author, speaker, and media commentator
- Lionel Chetwynd, screenwriter, motion picture and television film director and producer
- James Corum, air power historian and scholar of counter-insurgency
- Ann Coulter, political commentator and writer
- Adam Curry, political commentator and former MTV VJ
- Vox Day, publisher, activist, science fiction writer, journalist, musician, and video game designer
- Lou Dobbs, television personality, author, radio host and host of Lou Dobbs Tonight on Fox Business
- Michael Scott Doran, senior fellow at Hudson Institute
- Matt Drudge, political commentator, founder and editor of The Drudge Report
- Dinesh D'Souza, political commentator, author, and filmmaker
- Aleksandr Dugin, Russian political scientist, author of The Foundations of Geopolitics: The Geopolitical Future of Russia and The Fourth Political Theory, and member of the Eurasia Party
- Julie Nixon Eisenhower, author, daughter of former president Richard Nixon (1969–1974)
- Diana Furchtgott-Roth, economist
- Brigitte Gabriel, journalist, author, political lecturer and anti-Islamic activist
- Pamela Geller, political activist and commentator
- Joel Gilbert, filmmaker
- George Gilder, investor, writer, economist, techno-utopian advocate, and co-founder of the Discovery Institute
- Callista Gingrich, co-author of Rediscovering God in America
- David P. Goldman (a.k.a. "Spengler"), economist, music critic, and author
- Leon Hadar, global affairs analyst, journalist, blogger and author
- Liangliang He, anchor on Hong Kong–based Mandarin and Cantonese-language broadcaster Phoenix Television
- Katie Hopkins, newspaper columnist and TV personality
- David Horowitz, conservative writer, founder and president of the David Horowitz Freedom Center, and editor of FrontPage Magazine
- Deal W. Hudson, conservative political activist
- Carol Iannone, columnist, literary critic, critic of feminism, and founding vice president of the National Association of Scholars
- Paul Johnson, journalist, historian, speechwriter and author
- Dmitry Kiselyov, Russian journalist and head of government-owned international news agency Rossiya Segodnya
- Lawrence Kudlow, conservative commentator, economic analyst, television personality, newspaper columnist and host of The Kudlow Report
- Michael Ledeen, historian, philosopher, foreign policy analyst, and writer
- Herbert London, conservative activist, commentator, author, and academic
- John Lott, economist, political commentator, and gun rights advocate
- Scott McConnell, founding editor of American Conservative
- Gavin McInnes, writer, creative director, actor, comedian, and co-founder of Vice Media
- Brian Patrick Mitchell, writer, political theorist, and blogger
- Piers Morgan, journalist and television personality, writer for the Daily Mail
- Steven W. Mosher, social scientist, anti-abortion activist, author, and president of the Population Research Institute
- William Murchison, syndicated political columnist
- Deroy Murdock, political commentator and a contributing editor with National Review Online
- Melanie Phillips, newspaper opinion columnist
- Norman Podhoretz, conservative pundit, former adviser to the U.S. Information Agency (1981–87), and writer for Commentary
- Dave Portnoy, internet celebrity, blogger, and founder of the sports and pop culture blog Barstool Sports
- Alfred S. Regnery, lawyer, author, and former publisher
- Michael Scheuer, former CIA intelligence officer, blogger, author, political analyst, and former chief of the Bin Laden Issue Station
- Hossein Shariatmadari, Iranian conservative journalist and editor-in-chief of Kayhan
- Ross Terrill, academic, historian and journalist, expert in the history of China
- Cal Thomas, conservative syndicated columnist, pundit, author and radio commentator
- Emmett Tyrrell, conservative magazine editor
- Bradley C.S. Watson, political science educator, lawyer, and writer

=== Businesspeople ===
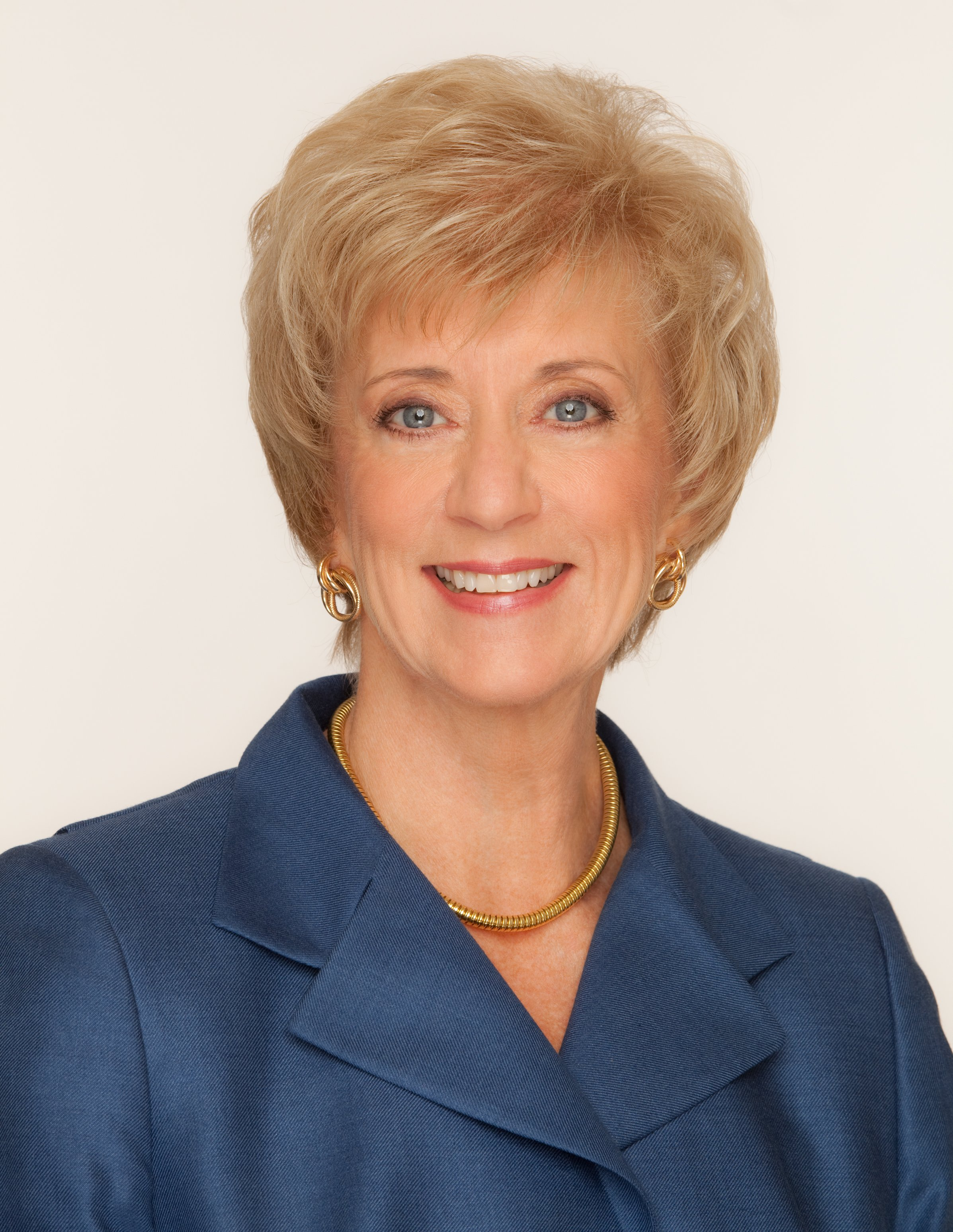
Businesswoman Linda McMahon in 2009

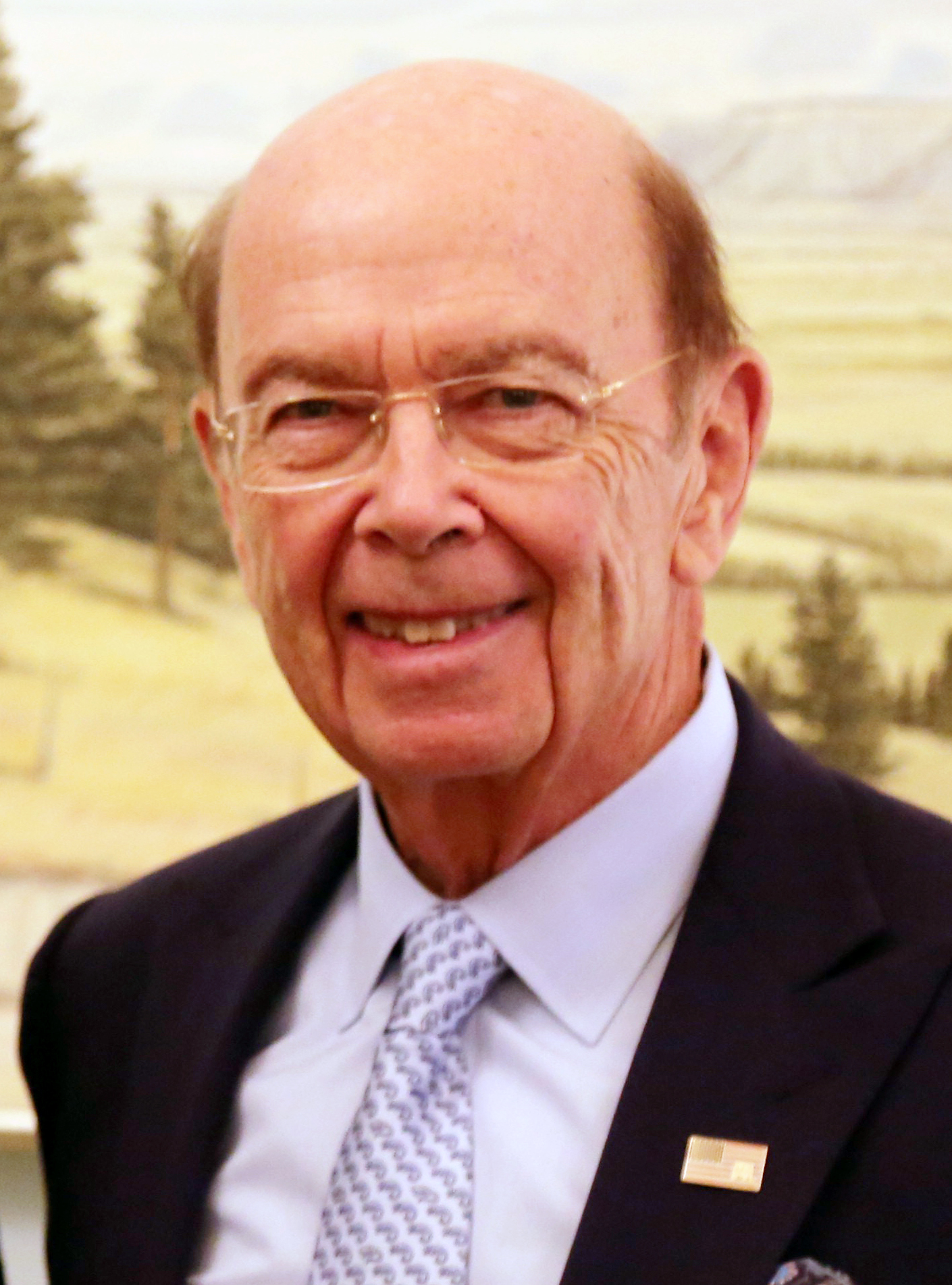
Investor Wilbur Ross in 2016

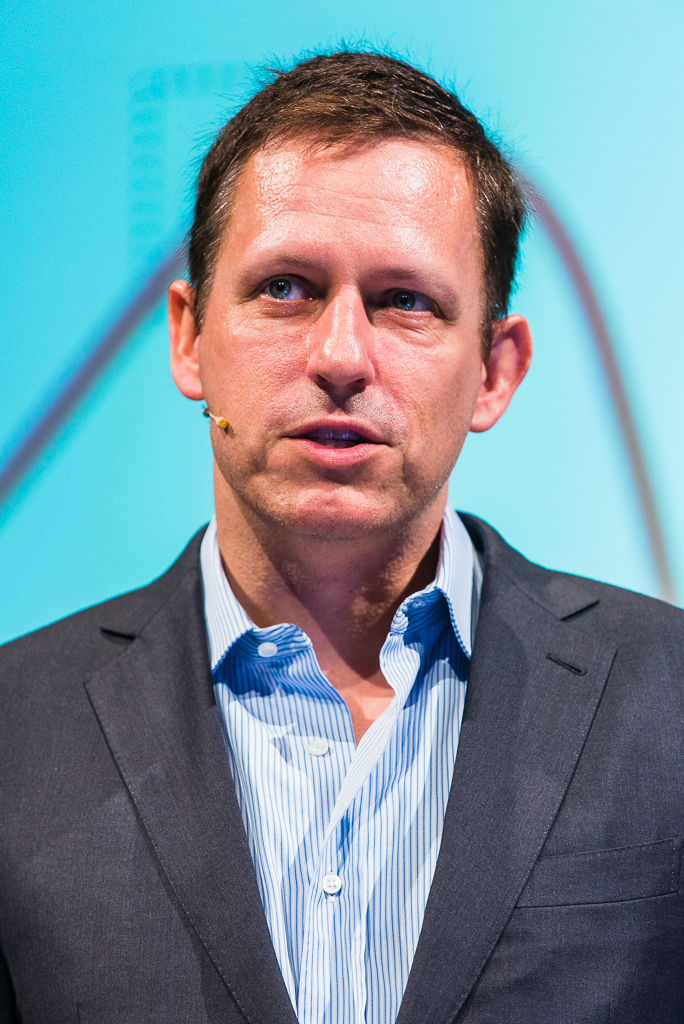
Entrepreneur Peter Thiel in 2014

- Sheldon Adelson, CEO of Las Vegas Sands
- Roger Ailes, former chairman and CEO of Fox News Channel, media consultant to presidential campaigns of Richard Nixon, Ronald Reagan, and George H. W. Bush
- David R. Barker, author, academic and businessman
- Thomas J. Barrack Jr., founder and chairman of Colony Capital
- Andrew Beal, founder and chairman of Beal Bank
- William Harrison Binnie, industrialist and investment banker, president of New Hampshire 1 Network and owner of Carlisle One Media, and chairman of the Finance Committee of the New Hampshire Republican State Committee
- Ernie Boch Jr., CEO of Boch Industries
- Elliott Broidy, venture capitalist
- Doug Burgum, entrepreneur, philanthropist, former president of Great Plains Software, former head of Microsoft Business Solutions, chairman of the board for Atlassian, and 2016 Republican nominee for governor of North Dakota
- Herman Cain, businessman and Tea Party politician (former 2000 and 2012 presidential candidate)
- Pete Coors, businessman and chairman of MillerCoors
- Jenny Craig, founder of Jenny Craig Inc.
- Jim Davis, owner and chairman of New Balance
- Darwin Deason, businessman and political donor
- Daniel R. DiMicco, former CEO of Nucor Corp
- Marc Faber, Swiss investor
- Steve Feinberg, financier and co-founder and CEO of Cerberus Capital Management
- Kenneth Fisher, investment analyst and the founder and chairman of Fisher Investments
- Steve Forbes, publishing executive, editor-in-chief of Forbes, and business magnate (former 1996 and 2000 presidential candidate)
- Brian France, CEO of NASCAR
- Neal B. Freeman, founder of the Blackwell Corporation, former president of the Corporation for Public Broadcasting
- Foster Friess, businessman and philanthropist
- David Green, businessman and CEO of Hobby Lobby
- Harold Hamm, entrepreneur and oil industry pioneer
- Stanley Hubbard, CEO of Hubbard Broadcasting
- Carl Icahn, business magnate, investor, activist shareholder, philanthropist, founder and majority shareholder of Icahn Enterprises and chairman of Federal-Mogul
- Andrew Intrater, head of Columbus Nova and cousin of Viktor Vekselberg
- Peter Kalikow, president of H. J. Kalikow & Company
- Robert Kiyosaki, businessman, investor, educator, motivational speaker and self-help author (authored two business books with the candidate)
- Bill Koch, businessman, sailor, and collector
- Shalabh Kumar, industrialist, philanthropist, and founder and head of the Republican Hindu Coalition
- Charles Kushner, real estate developer and co-owner of Kushner Properties
- Jared Kushner, co-owner of Kushner Properties, owner of The New York Observer, son-in-law of the candidate
- Kenneth Langone, co-founder of The Home Depot
- Richard LeFrak, real-estate businessman
- Howard Lorber, businessman, investor and CEO of Vector Group
- Ted Malloch, CEO of the Roosevelt Group
- David Malpass, founder and president of Encima Global LLC, deputy assistant treasury secretary under President Ronald Reagan, deputy assistant secretary of state under President George H. W. Bush
- Doug Manchester, businessman, real estate developer, and former newspaper publisher
- Linda McMahon, former president and CEO of WWE and Republican nominee for Senate from Connecticut in 2010 and 2012
- Robert Mercer, computer scientist and co-CEO of Renaissance Technologies
- Larry Mizel, chairman and CEO of MDC Holdings
- Steven Mnuchin, banker, political fundraiser, CEO of Dune Capital Management and finance chair of the Donald Trump 2016 presidential campaign
- Stephen Moore, economic writer, policy analyst, co-founder and former president of the Club for Growth, former member of the Wall Street Journal editorial board, and former chief economist for The Heritage Foundation
- Rupert Murdoch, media mogul, former CEO of 21st Century Fox
- Terry Neese, founder of Terry Neese Personnel Services and the Institute for the Economic Empowerment of Women
- John Paulson, hedge fund manager and president of Paulson & Co.
- Dan Peña, businessman and business coach
- Dave Portnoy, businessman and founder of Barstool Sports
- Anthony Pratt, Australian billionaire, executive chairman of Visy and Pratt Industries
- Joe Ricketts, founder, former CEO and former chairman of TD Ameritrade
- Wilbur Ross, investor, owner of WL Ross & Co., owner of International Steel Group, vice chairman of Bank of Cyprus
- Steven Roth, real estate investor and CEO of Vornado Realty Trust
- Phil Ruffin, businessman, owner of Treasure Island Hotel and Casino, and partner of Trump Hotel Las Vegas
- Anthony Scaramucci, financier, entrepreneur, author, founder and co-managing partner of SkyBridge Capital, and host of Wall Street Week on Fox Business
- Martin Selig, founder and owner of Martin Selig Real Estate
- Patrick Soon-Shiong
- German Sterligov, Russian businessman and environmentalist
- Peter Thiel, entrepreneur, venture capitalist, hedge fund manager, co-founder of PayPal, board member of Facebook, libertarian, and transhumanist
- Donald Trump Jr., businessman, son of the candidate
- Eric Trump, businessman and philanthropist, son of the candidate
- Ivanka Trump, businesswoman, writer, and former model, daughter of the candidate
- Dana White, president of Ultimate Fighting Championship
- Vladimir Yakunin, Russian businessman, public figure, former president of Russian Railways, and founder and president of the World Public Forum "Dialogue of Civilizations"
- Richard Yuengling Jr., owner of Yuengling Brewery

=== Political strategists ===
- Mark Corallo, political communications and public relations professional, co-founder and co-principal of Corallo Comstock
- Steve Hilton, British political strategist
- Paul Manafort, lobbyist, political consultant, and former director at the Center for the Study of Democratic Institutions
- Dick Morris, political author and commentator, former pollster, political campaign consultant, and general political consultant
- David Saunders, political strategist and author (Democratic)
- Roger Stone, political consultant, lobbyist, and strategist

=== Radio hosts ===
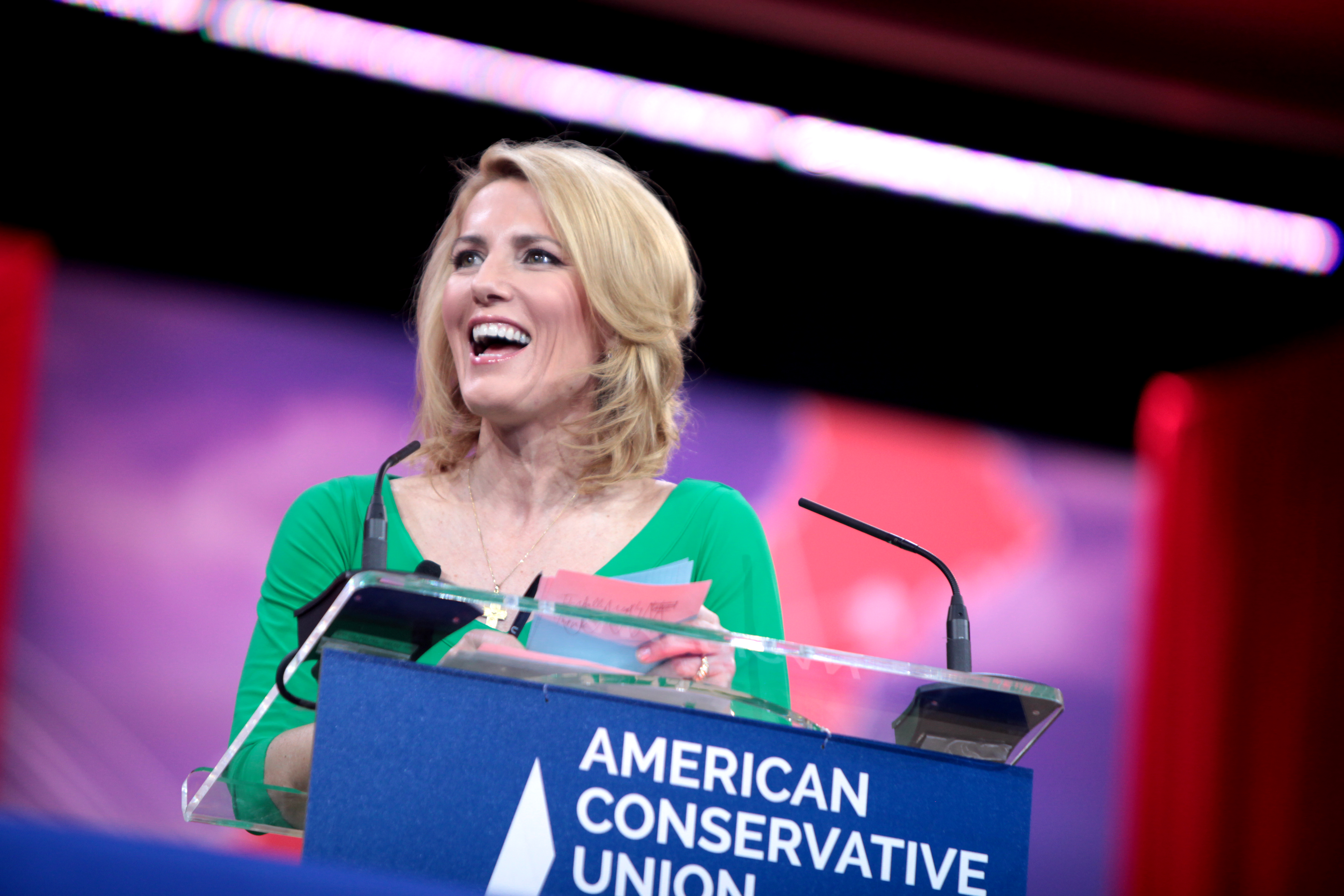
Radio host Laura Ingraham speaking at CPAC in 2015

- Mark Belling
- Anthony Cumia
- Mike Francesa
- Sean Hannity, also host of Hannity on Fox News Channel
- Laura Ingraham
- Lars Larson
- Mark Levin
- Dennis Prager
- Jeff Rense
- Michael Savage
- Rick Wiles, TruNews

=== Religious leaders ===
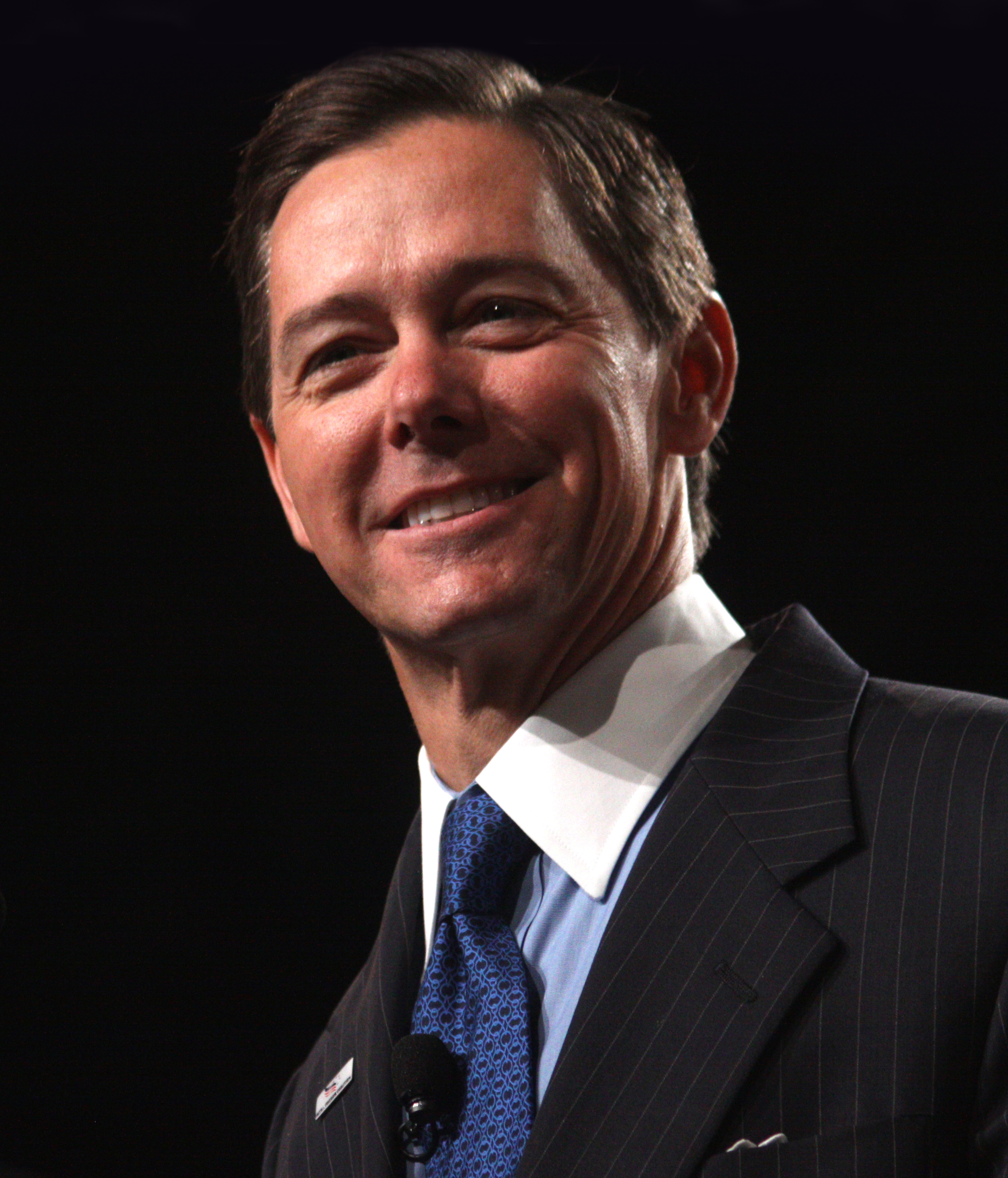
Christian activist Ralph Reed in 2011

- Jim Bakker, televangelist, former Assemblies of God minister and radio host
- C.L. Bryant, Baptist minister, radio and television host
- Mark Burns, pastor and co-founder of the South Carolina-based Christian TV network, the NOW Network
- James Dobson, evangelical Protestant author, psychologist, and founder of Focus on the Family
- Jerry Falwell Jr., president of Liberty University
- Jim Garlow, pastor of Skyline Church
- Norman Geisler, Christian systematic theologian, philosopher, and co-founder of Southern Evangelical Seminary
- John Hagee, founder and senior pastor of Cornerstone Church; CEO of Global Evangelism Television
- Bill Johnson, pastor of Bethel Church in Redding, California
- James F. Linzey, ordained minister in the Southern Baptist Convention
- Eric Metaxas, author, speaker, and radio host
- Mike Murdock, singer-songwriter, televangelist and pastor of the Wisdom Center ministry
- Frank Pavone, national director of Priests for Life
- Ralph E. Reed Jr., conservative activist, former director of the Christian Coalition, founder of the Faith and Freedom Coalition, and 2006 Republican candidate for lieutenant governor of Georgia
- Pat Robertson, former Southern Baptist minister and chairman of the Christian Broadcasting Network
- Lance Wallnau, preacher associated with the New Apostolic Reformation movement
- Paula White, televangelist

=== Republican Party figures ===
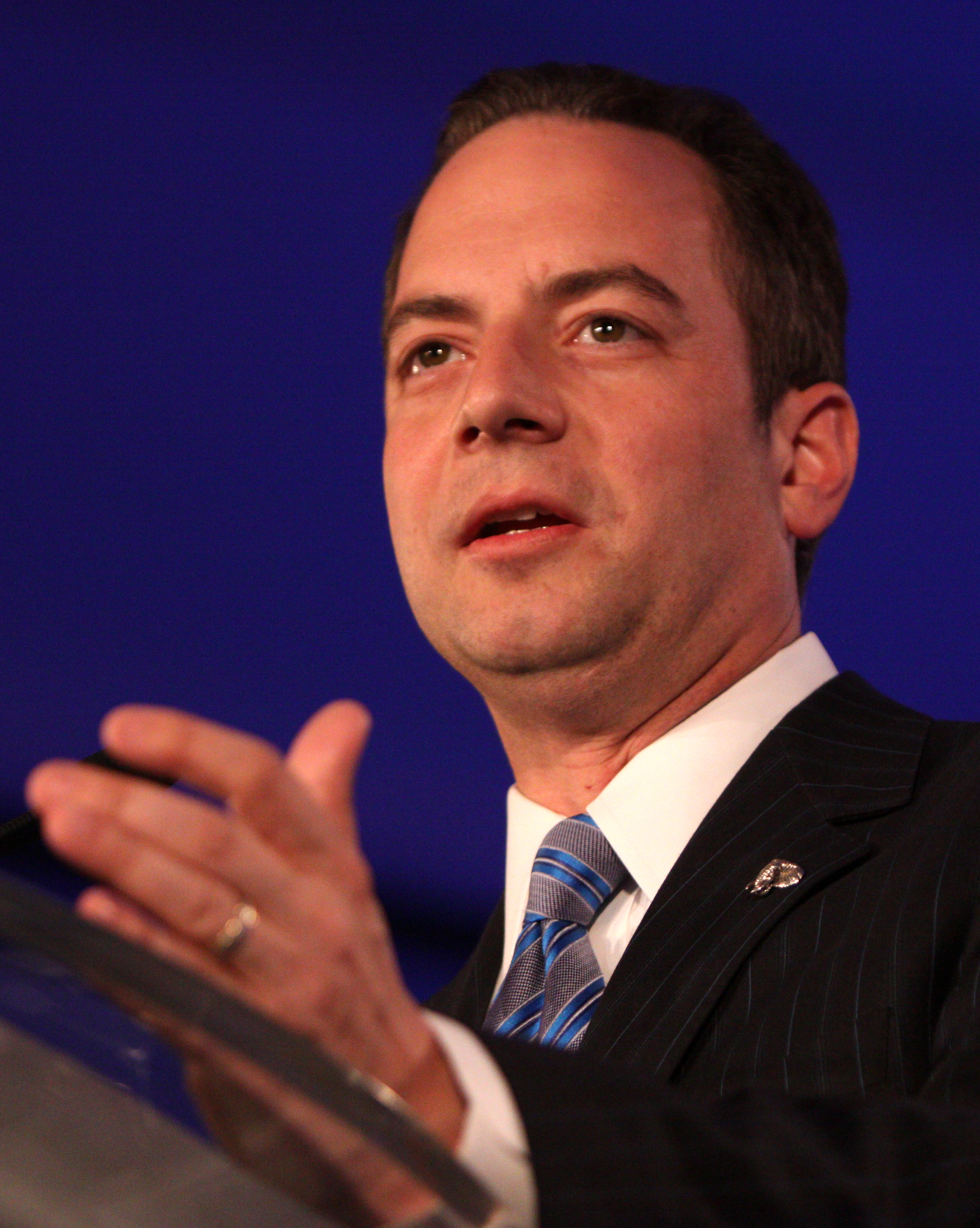
Republican National Committee Chairman Reince Priebus in 2011

- Gary Bauer, politician and activist
- Morton Blackwell, Republican national committeeman from Virginia
- Jim Brulte, chairman of the California Republican Party
- Patrick Davis, political consultant and strategist
- Arnaldo Ferraro, Republican Party chairman of Kings County, New York
- Ed Gillespie, former chairman of the Republican National Committee (2003–05), former Counselor to the President (2007–09), and 2017 Republican candidate for governor of Virginia
- Eric Greitens, 2016 Republican nominee for governor of Missouri
- Josh Hawley, 2016 Republican nominee for Missouri attorney general
- Tirso del Junco, former chairman of the California Republican Party
- Joseph Mondello, Republican Party chairman of Nassau County
- Tom Pauken, former chairman of the Texas Republican Party
- Reince Priebus, chairman of the Republican National Committee (2011–2017), former chairman of the Republican Party of Wisconsin
- Ronna Romney McDaniel, chairwoman of the Michigan Republican Party, member of the Romney family
- Christine Jack Toretti, Republican national committeewoman from Pennsylvania
- Chuck Yob, former Republican national committeeman from Michigan

=== Social and political activists ===
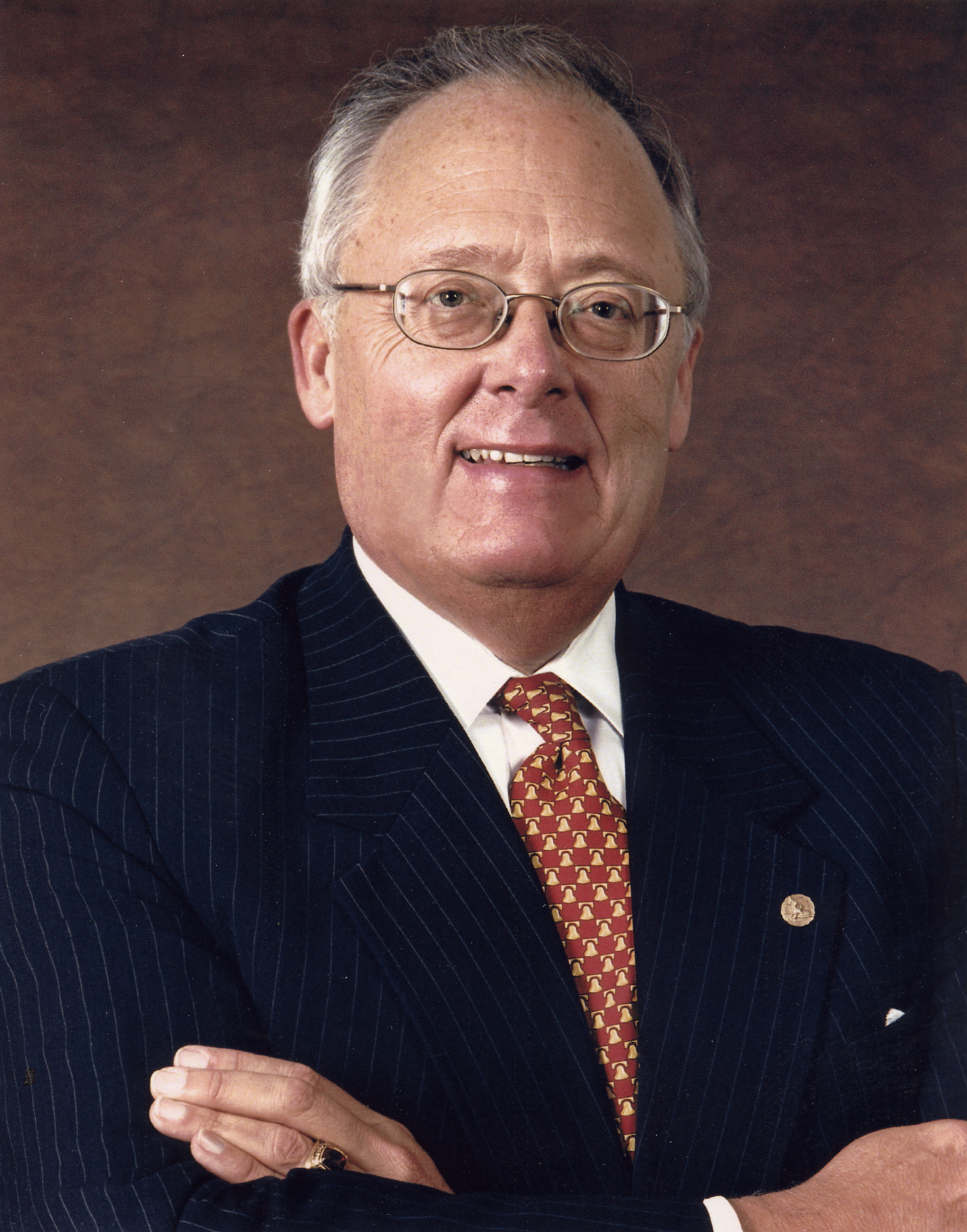
Former president of The Heritage Foundation Edwin Feulner in 2008

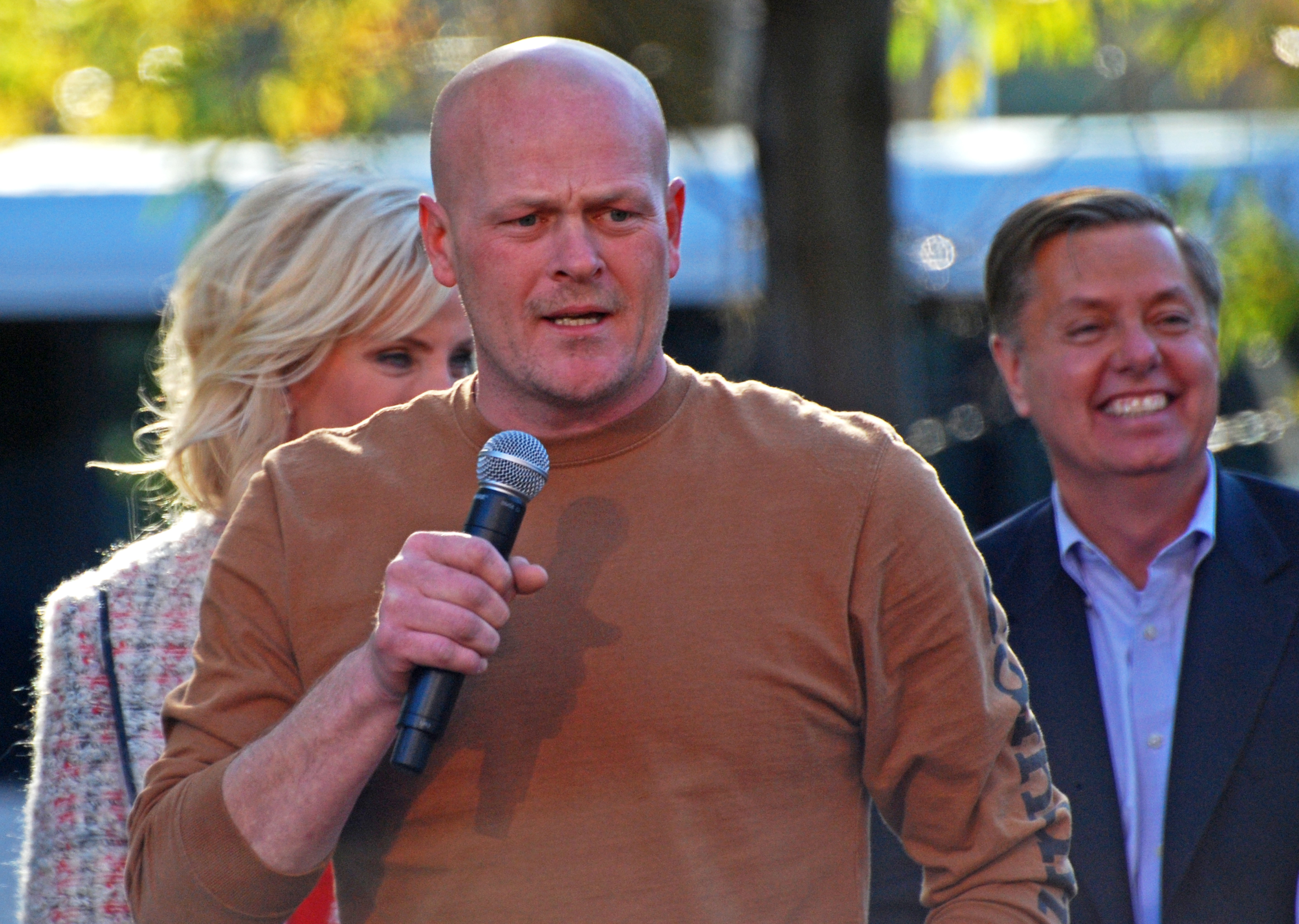
Conservative activist 'Joe the Plumber' in 2008

- Christopher R. Barron, political activist and consultant, former national political director for Log Cabin Republicans, co-founder of GOProud, an organization representing conservative gays, president of CapSouth Consulting, and founder of LGBT for Trump
- Marjorie Dannenfelser, anti-abortion activist and president of the Susan B. Anthony List
- Elizabeth Emken, former president of Autism Speaks and Republican nominee for Senate from California in 2012
- Edwin Feulner, former president of The Heritage Foundation
- Day Gardner, founder and president of the National Black Pro Life Union; associate director of National Pro-Life Center
- Clarence Henderson, civil rights activist and participant in the Woolworth sit-in
- Alveda King, activist, niece of Martin Luther King Jr.
- Amy Kremer, Tea Party activist
- Trevor Loudon, author, speaker and political activist
- Jenny Beth Martin, co-founder and national coordinator of the Tea Party Patriots
- K. T. McFarland, senior fellow at the American Conservative Union
- Jimmy McMillan, rent activist, perennial candidate, and founder of The Rent Is Too Damn High Party
- Troy Newman, president of the anti-abortion organization Operation Rescue
- Grover Norquist, political advocate and president of Americans for Tax Reform
- CJ Pearson, political activist (previously endorsed Rand Paul, Ted Cruz and Bernie Sanders)
- Jerry Regier, founder and first president of the Family Research Council
- Brooke Rollins, president of the Texas Public Policy Foundation
- Austin Ruse, president of the Catholic Family and Human Rights Institute
- Matt Schlapp, president of the American Conservative Union
- Rocky Suhayda, white supremacist and chairman of the American Nazi Party
- Milton Wolf, physician, Tea Party activist; second cousin, once removed of Barack Obama

=== University and academic figures ===
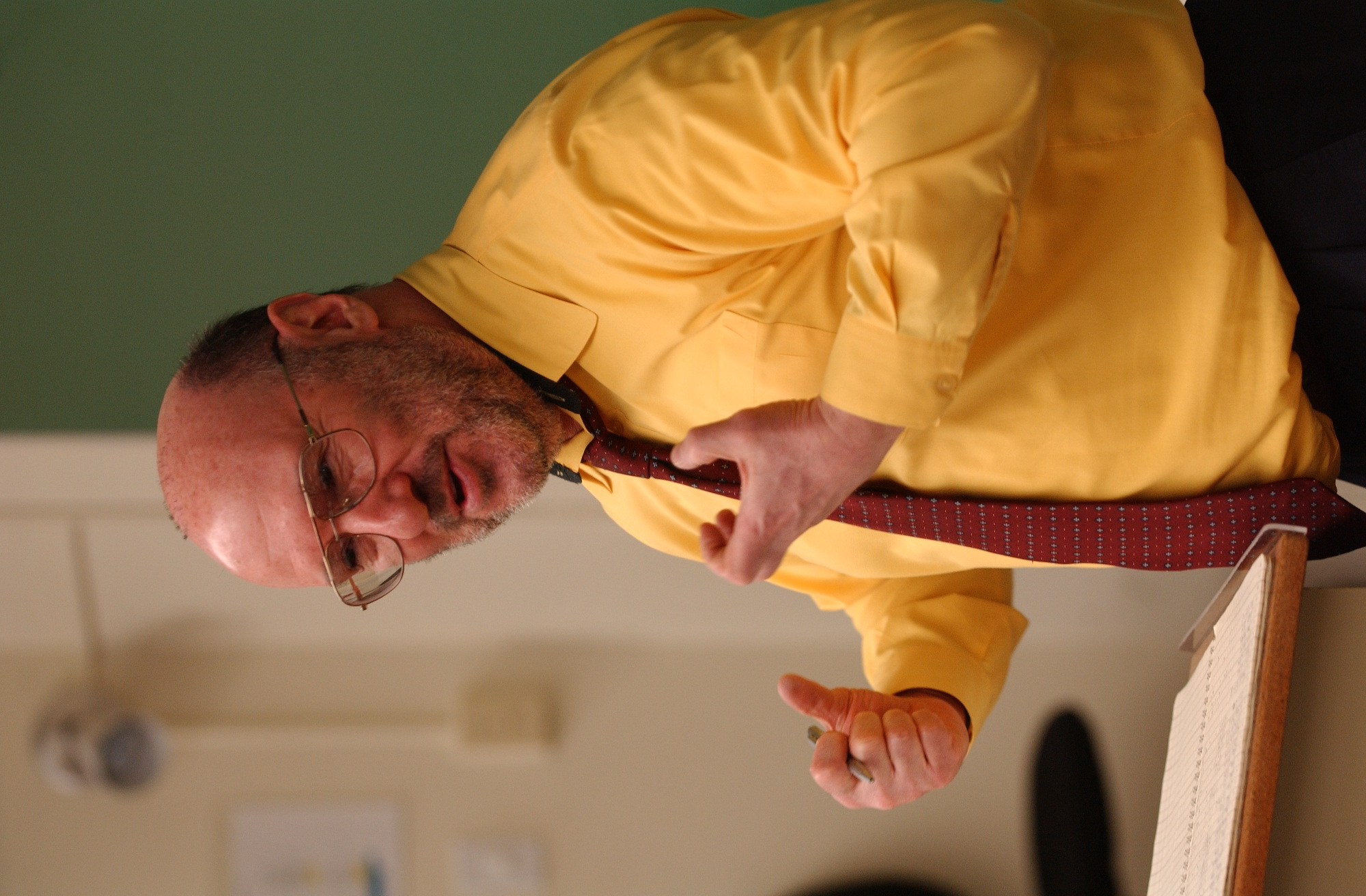
Walter Block speaking in 2008

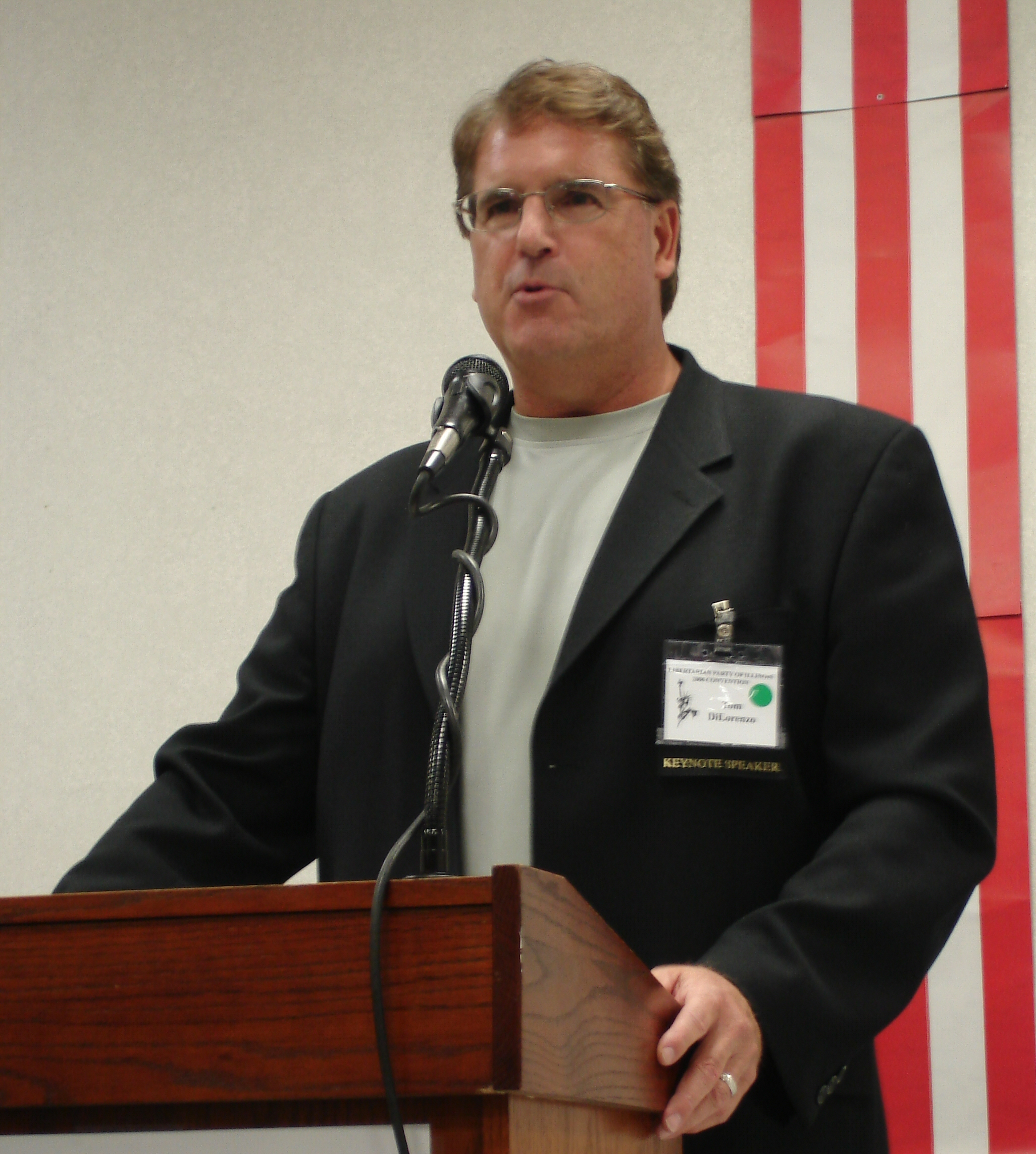
Thomas DiLorenzo speaking in 2006

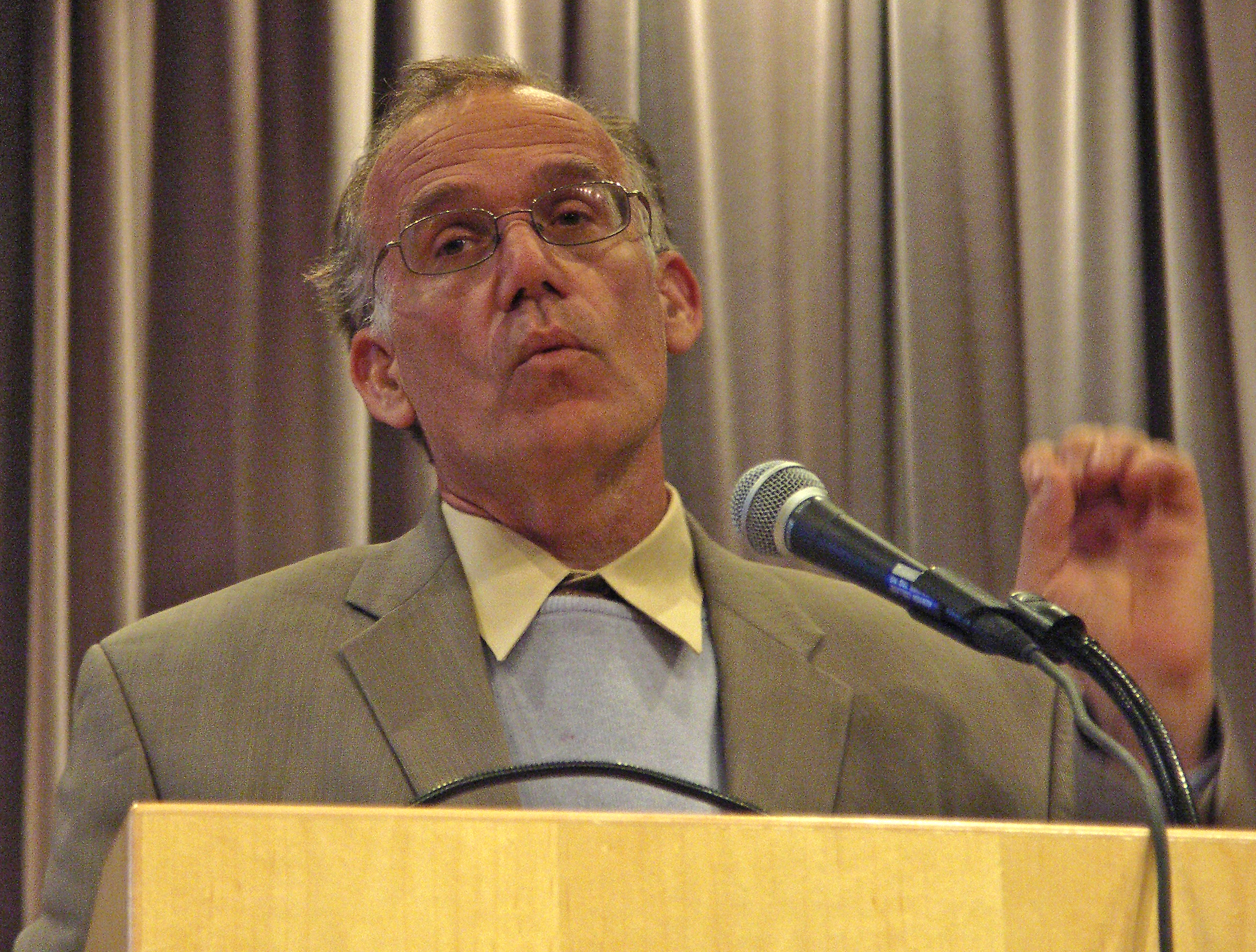
Victor Hanson lecturing in 2005

Current

- A.D. Amar, professor of Management at Seton Hall University
- Hadley Arkes, political scientist and the Edward N. Ney Professor of Jurisprudence and American Institutions emeritus at Amherst College
- Larry P. Arnn, president of Hillsdale College
- Mark Bauerlein, professor of English at Emory University
- Jay Bergman, professor of History at Central Connecticut State University, president of the directors Connecticut affiliate of the National Association of Scholars, and member of the Connecticut Advisory Committee to the United States Commission on Civil Rights
- Walter Block, professor of Economics at the J. A. Butt School of Business at Loyola University New Orleans, senior fellow at the Ludwig von Mises Institute, and author of Defending the Undefendable
- Daniel Bonevac, professor of Philosophy at the University of Texas at Austin
- F.H. Buckley, Foundation Professor at George Mason University School of Law
- Thomas DiLorenzo, professor of Economics at the Loyola University Maryland Sellinger School of Business, research fellow at the Independent Institute, senior fellow at the Ludwig von Mises Institute and member of the Mont Pelerin Society
- John C. Eastman, Henry Salvatori Professor of Law & Community Service at the Chapman University School of Law
- Jerry Falwell, president of Liberty University
- Burton W. Folsom Jr., of Hillsdale College
- Bruce Frohnen, professor of Law at Ohio Northern University College of Law
- Lino Graglia, A. W. Walker Centennial Chair in Law at University of Texas
- Anne Hendershott, professor of Psychology at Franciscan University of Steubenville
- Charles R. Kesler, professor of Government/Political Science at Claremont McKenna College and Claremont Graduate University
- E. Christian Kopff, professor of Classics at University of Colorado Boulder
- James F. Linzey, chief editor of the Modern English Version Bible and ordained minister in the Southern Baptist Convention
- Robert Oscar Lopez, associate professor of English and Classics at California State University, Northridge
- Henry R. Nau, professor of Political Science and International Affairs at Elliott School of International Affairs at George Washington University
- Peter Navarro, professor of Economics and Public Policy at the Paul Merage School of Business, University of California, Irvine
- Walid Phares, professor at the National Intelligence University and president of the Global Policy Institute think tank
- Daniel N. Robinson, distinguished professor emeritus of Philosophy at Georgetown University; fellow of the faculty of Philosophy, Oxford University
- Ronald Rotunda, professor of Law at Chapman University School of Law
- Paul Rubin, Samuel Candler Dobbs Professor of Economics at Emory University
- Ronald J. Rychlak, associate dean For Academic Affairs and the Mississippi Defense Lawyers Association Professor of Law at the University of Mississippi School of Law
- Larry Schweikart, professor of History at University of Dayton
- Harold See, professor of Law at Belmont University
- Janet E. Smith, professor of Moral Theology at Sacred Heart Major Seminary in Detroit, Michigan
- Scott Soames, professor of Philosophy at the University of Southern California
- Carol M. Swain, professor of Political Science and Law at Vanderbilt University
- Frank J. Tipler, mathematical physicist and cosmologist, holds a joint appointment in the Departments of Mathematics and Physics at Tulane University
- James Trefil, Robinson Professor of Physics at George Mason University
- Thomas G. West, professor of Politics at Hillsdale College
- Clyde N. Wilson, professor of History at the University of South Carolina, contributing editor for Chronicles: A Magazine of American Culture and Southern Partisan magazine, chair of the Abbeville Institute, and co-founder of the League of the South

Former

- Stephen Balch, founded the Institute for the Study of Western Civilization at Texas Tech University, founding president of the National Association of Scholars (1987–2009), and 2007 National Humanities Medal laureate
- Ben Carson, retired Johns Hopkins neurosurgeon (former 2016 presidential candidate)
- Paul Gottfried, former professor of Humanities at Elizabethtown College
- Thomas Lindsay, former president of Shimer College
- John Lott, former visiting professor and fellow of Economics at the University of Chicago
- Modesto Maidique, former president of Florida International University
- Ralph Raico, former professor of History at Buffalo State College
- Milton J. Rosenberg, professor emeritus of Psychology at the University of Chicago
- Fred Singer, professor emeritus of environmental science at the University of Virginia
- Bradley C.S. Watson, professor of Politics at Saint Vincent College in Latrobe, Pennsylvania
- Robert Weissberg, professor emeritus of political science at the University of Illinois

=== Lawyers ===
- Tony Buzbee
- Victoria Toensing
- Adam Walinsky (Democratic)

=== Other ===
- Juanita Broaddrick, former nursing home administrator, accused Bill Clinton of rape
- Gennifer Flowers, former actress and author, had a sexual encounter with Bill Clinton
- Paula Jones, former Arkansas state employee, accused Bill Clinton of sexual harassment
- Malik Obama, half-brother of Barack Obama
- Kathy Shelton, sexual assault survivor, Hillary Clinton was assigned as defense counsel for her rapist
- Kathleen Willey, former White House volunteer, accused Bill Clinton of sexual assault

== Celebrities ==
=== Actors and comedians ===
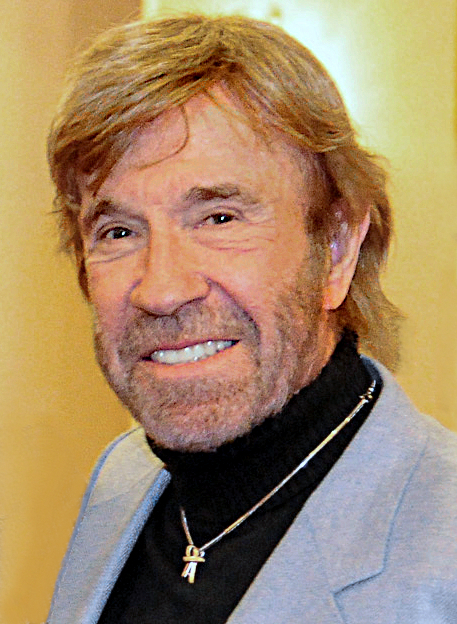
Chuck Norris in 2015

- Tim Allen
- Kirstie Alley
- Scott Baio
- Stephen Baldwin
- Roseanne Barr
- Jim Breuer
- Gary Busey
- James Caan
- Dean Cain
- Kirk Cameron
- Adam Carolla
- Stacey Dash
- Robert Davi
- Julienne Davis
- Christine Ebersole
- R. Lee Ermey
- Lou Ferrigno
- Vincent Gallo
- Kelsey Grammer
- Butch Hartman
- Victoria Jackson
- Rich Little
- David McCallum
- Michael Moriarty
- John O'Hurley
- Joe Piscopo
- Randy Quaid
- John Ratzenberger
- Antonio Sabàto Jr.
- Rob Schneider
- Steven Seagal
- Nick Searcy
- Kevin Sorbo
- Kristy Swanson
- Ann Turkel
- Janine Turner
- Jean-Claude Van Damme
- Jon Voight
- Fred Williamson
- James Woods

==== Adult entertainers ====
- Amy Lindsay
- Brandi Love

=== Athletes and sports figures ===
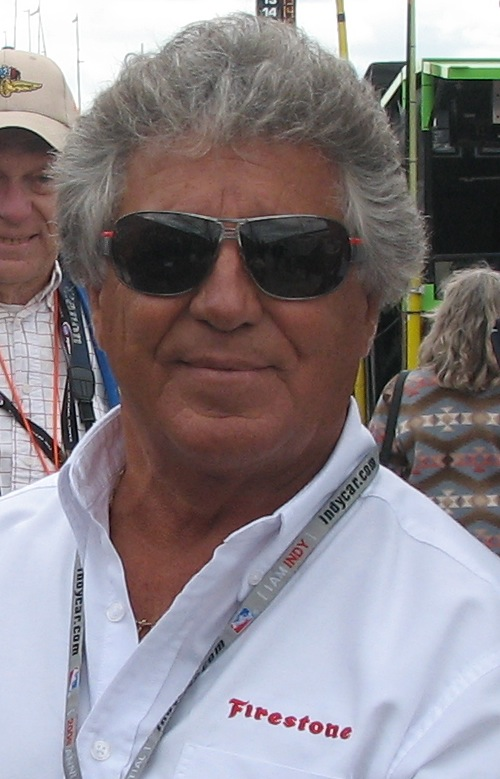
Mario Andretti

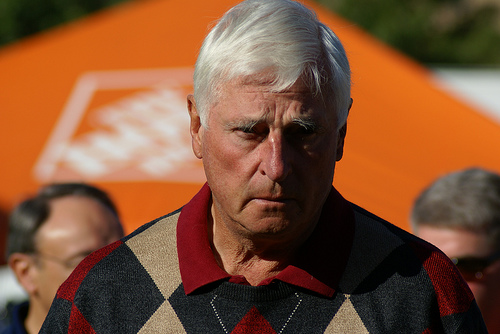
Bob Knight

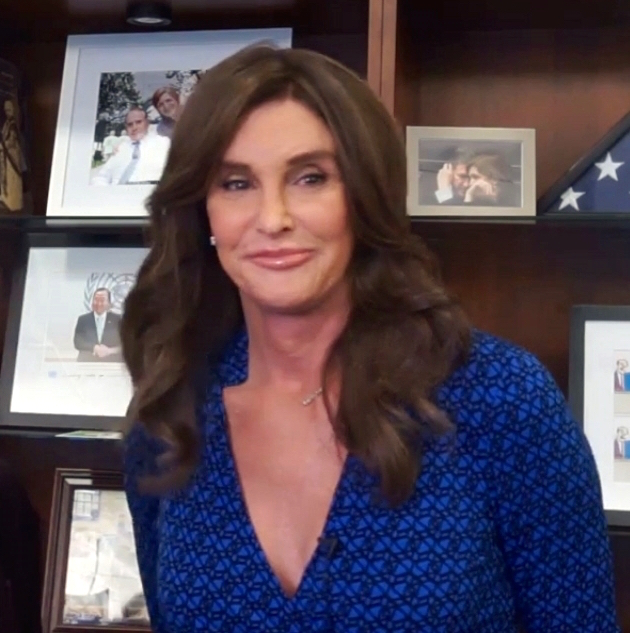
Caitlyn Jenner

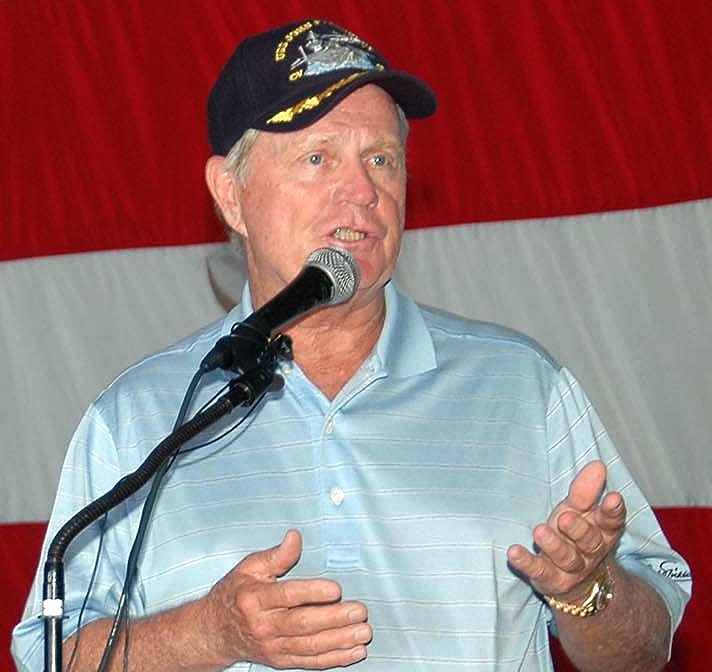
Jack Nicklaus

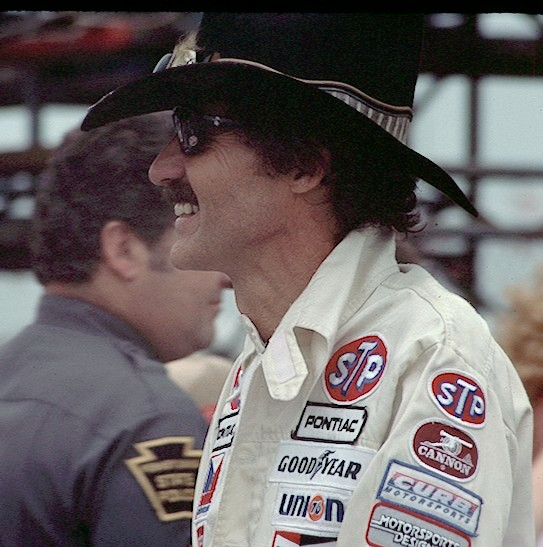
Richard Petty

Archery/shooting

- Kim Rhode

Baseball

- Johnny Bench
- George Brett
- Clay Buchholz
- Johnny Damon
- Paul O'Neill
- John Rocker
- Curt Schilling

Basketball

- Gordon Hayward
- Gene Keady
- Bob Knight
- Kevin McHale
- Billy Packer
- Digger Phelps
- Dennis Rodman
- Latrell Sprewell

Boxing, mixed martial arts and pro wrestling

- Adrien Broner
- Mark Calaway
- Big Cass
- Nick Dinsmore
- George Foreman
- Royce Gracie
- Hulk Hogan
- Holly Holm
- Kane
- Don King
- Jerry Lawler
- Dutch Mantel
- Shawn Michaels
- Chael Sonnen
- Miesha Tate
- Mike Tyson
- Nikolai Volkoff
- Chris Weidman

Football

- Rocky Boiman
- Nick Bosa
- Mike Ditka
- Vince Dooley
- John Harbaugh
- Lou Holtz
- Richie Incognito
- Jerry Jones
- Shad Khan
- Robert Kraft
- Stan Kroenke
- Mike Leach
- Matt Light
- Nick Mangold
- A. J. McCarron
- Bob McNair
- Shawne Merriman
- Terrell Owens
- Rex Ryan
- Mike Shanahan
- Fred Smerlas
- Daniel Snyder
- Fran Tarkenton
- Herschel Walker
- Derek Wolfe
- Eric Wood

Golf

- John Daly
- Natalie Gulbis
- Jack Nicklaus

Ice skating

- Scott Hamilton

Ice hockey

- Max Domi
- Robin Lehner

Racing

- Mario Andretti
- P. J. Chesson
- Richard Childress
- Bobby Dotter
- Bernie Ecclestone
- Bill Elliott
- Chase Elliott
- Ray Evernham
- Korbin Forrister
- Brian France
- Ernie Irvan
- Mark Martin
- Ryan Newman
- Richard Petty
- David Ragan
- Jay Robinson
- Greg Sacks
- Austin Wayne Self
- Reed Sorenson
- Kenny Wallace
- Michael Waltrip

Track and field

- Caitlyn Jenner

=== Media personalities and socialites ===
- Farrah Abraham
- Dan Bilzerian
- Adam Curry
- Diamond and Silk
- Mark Dice
- FPSRussia
- Teresa Giudice
- Corey Harrison
- Paris Hilton
- Keemstar
- Danny Koker
- Judy Shalom Nir-Mozes
- Jeanine Pirro
- Jase Robertson
- Phil Robertson
- Sadie Robertson
- Willie Robertson
- Judge Judy Sheindlin
- Ivana Trump
- Kendra Wilkinson
- Dale Winton
- Chuck Woolery
- Melissa Ann Young

=== Singers and musicians ===
- Trace Adkins
- Alabama
- Tom Araya
- Azealia Banks
- Zoltan Bathory
- Pat Boone
- Terry Butler
- Jonathan Cain
- Cowboy Troy
- Charlie Daniels
- Glenn Danzig
- Rick Derringer
- Don Dokken
- Ace Frehley
- Larry Gatlin
- Craig Goldy
- Michale Graves
- Lee Greenwood
- Sammy Hagar
- Jesse Hughes
- Kid Rock
- Filipp Kirkorov
- Joey Kramer
- Gary LeVox
- Aaron Lewis
- Mike Love
- Loretta Lynn
- Meat Loaf
- Bret Michaels
- Wendell Mobley
- Justin Moore
- Naked Cowboy
- Wayne Newton
- Ted Nugent
- Tim "Ripper" Owens
- Vinnie Paul
- John Petrucci
- John Rich
- Rikki Rockett
- Kenny Rogers
- Jack Russell
- Jon Schaffer
- David Silveria
- Gene Simmons
- Ricky Skaggs
- Steve Smith
- Red Steagall
- Marc Terenzi
- Neil Thrasher
- Marq Torien
- Joe Lynn Turner
- Ross Valory
- Joy Villa
- Jimmy Wayne
- Kanye West
- White Dawg
- Michael Wilton
- Darryl Worley
- Young Dro

== Newspapers, magazines, and other media ==
=== National ===
- The Crusader, the official newspaper of the Ku Klux Klan (denounced by Trump's campaign)
- Florida Times-Union, Jacksonville, Florida
- Las Vegas Review-Journal, Las Vegas, Nevada
- Long Island Jewish World, Long Island, New York
- The National Enquirer
- New York Observer, New York City (owned by Jared Kushner, Trump's son-in-law)
- Santa Barbara News-Press, Santa Barbara, California
- St. Joseph News-Press, St Joseph Missouri
- The Times-Gazette, Hillsboro, Ohio
- The Washington Times, Washington, DC

=== Foreign ===
- DPRK Today, North Korean state media
- Israel Hayom, Israel's largest circulation newspaper.

== National organizations ==
- American Energy Alliance
- Gays for Trump
- Great America PAC
- Hindu Sena, Indian Hindu nationalist organization
- International Defensive Pistol Association
- National Black Republican Association
- NRA Political Victory Fund
- Traditionalist Youth Network

=== State and local organizations ===
Log Cabin Republican chapters that endorsed Donald Trump for the 2016 United States presidential election

- Log Cabin Republicans: Cleveland, Colorado, Georgia, Houston, Los Angeles, Miami, Orange County, and Texas chapters

=== Labor unions ===
- Fraternal Order of Police
- National Border Patrol Council, largest border patrol union in U.S. representing 16,000 members (first presidential endorsement in union's history)

== U.S. state political parties ==
- Conservative Party of New York State
- Independent Party of Delaware

== Minor political parties ==
- American Freedom Party
- American Independent Party

== Business leaders ==
| Name | Associated organizations and role | Known donation amount |
|---|---|---|
| Sheldon Adelson | Las Vegas Sands, chairman | $25,000,000 |
| Pete Coors | MillerCoors, chairman | Unknown |
| Jim Davis | New Balance, owner & chairperson | $400,000 |
| Diane Hendricks | ABC Supply, CEO | Unknown |
| Peter Thiel | PayPal, founder; Facebook, board member; Palantir, founder; Trump Administration, tech adviser | $1.25 million |
| Dana White | UFC, president | Unknown |

== See also ==
- List of Hillary Clinton presidential campaign political endorsements, 2016
- List of Hillary Clinton presidential campaign non-political endorsements, 2016
- List of Gary Johnson presidential campaign endorsements, 2016
- List of Republicans who opposed the Donald Trump presidential campaign, 2016
- List of Bernie Sanders presidential campaign endorsements, 2016
- List of Jill Stein presidential campaign endorsements, 2016
- Newspaper endorsements in the United States presidential primaries, 2016
- Newspaper endorsements in the United States presidential election, 2016
- List of Donald Trump presidential campaign endorsements, 2020
