= List of Donald Trump 2020 presidential campaign non-political endorsements =

This is a list of notable individual and organizations who publicly indicated support for Donald Trump in the 2020 United States presidential election.

== Businesspeople ==
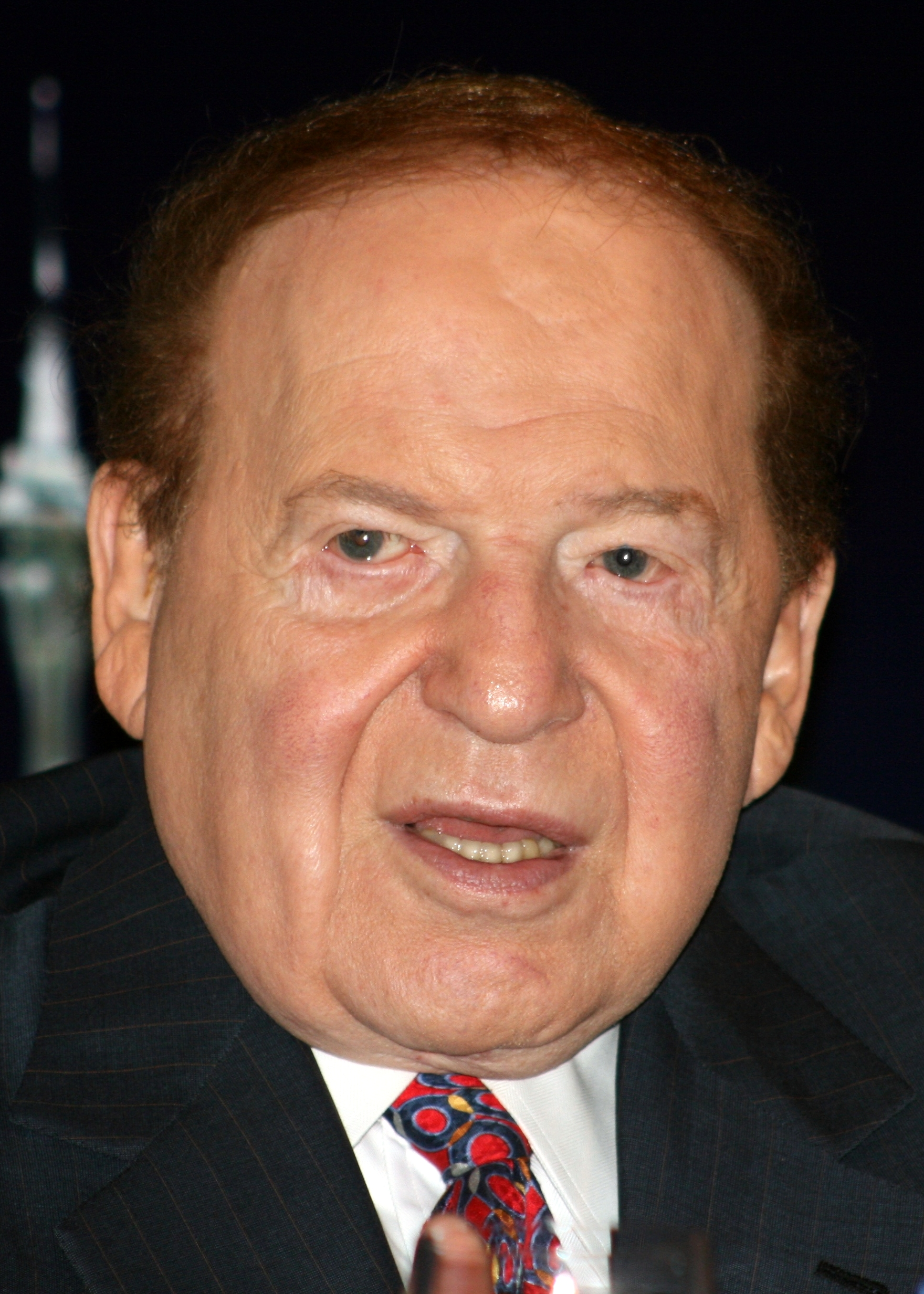
Sheldon Adelson

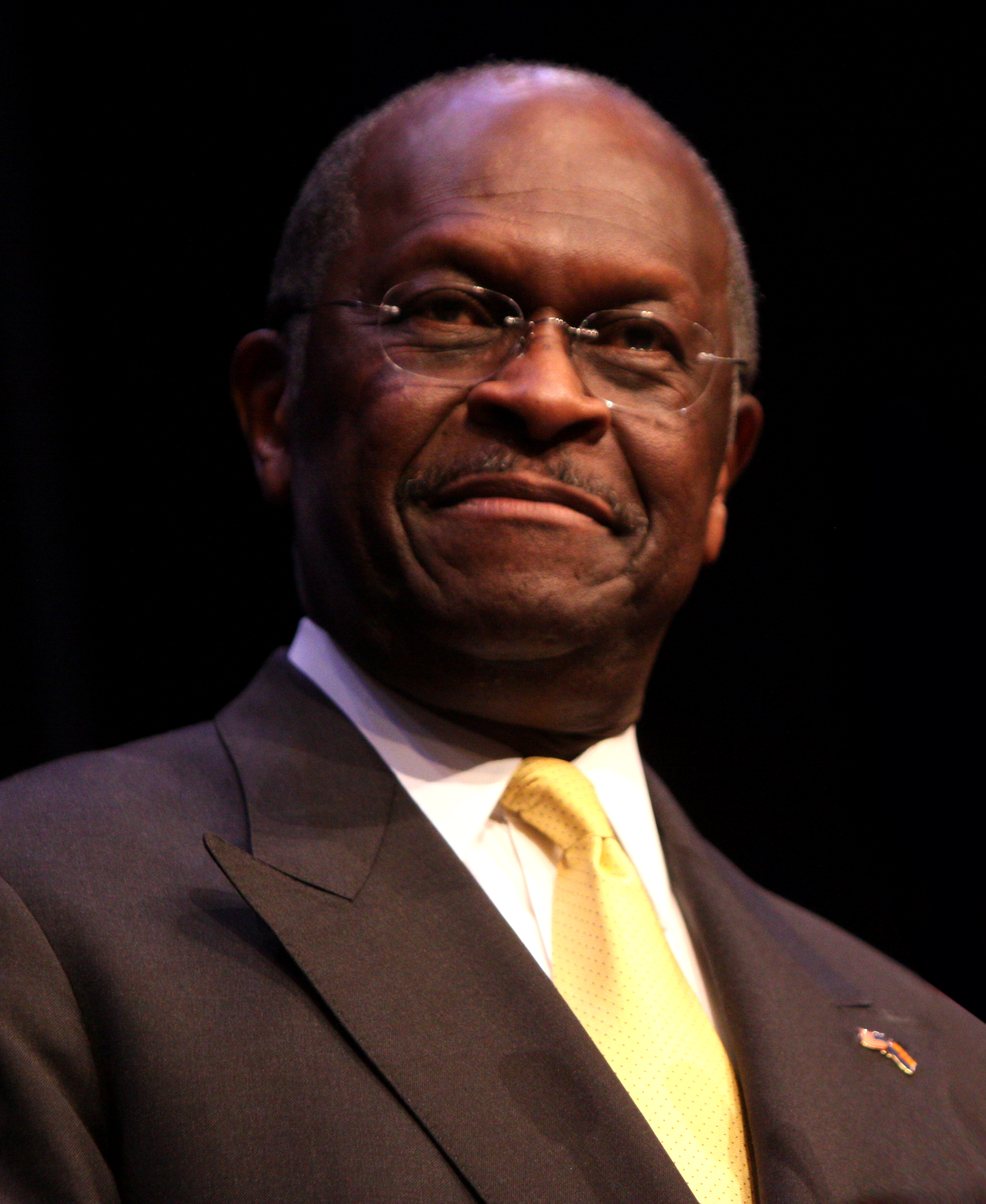
Herman Cain

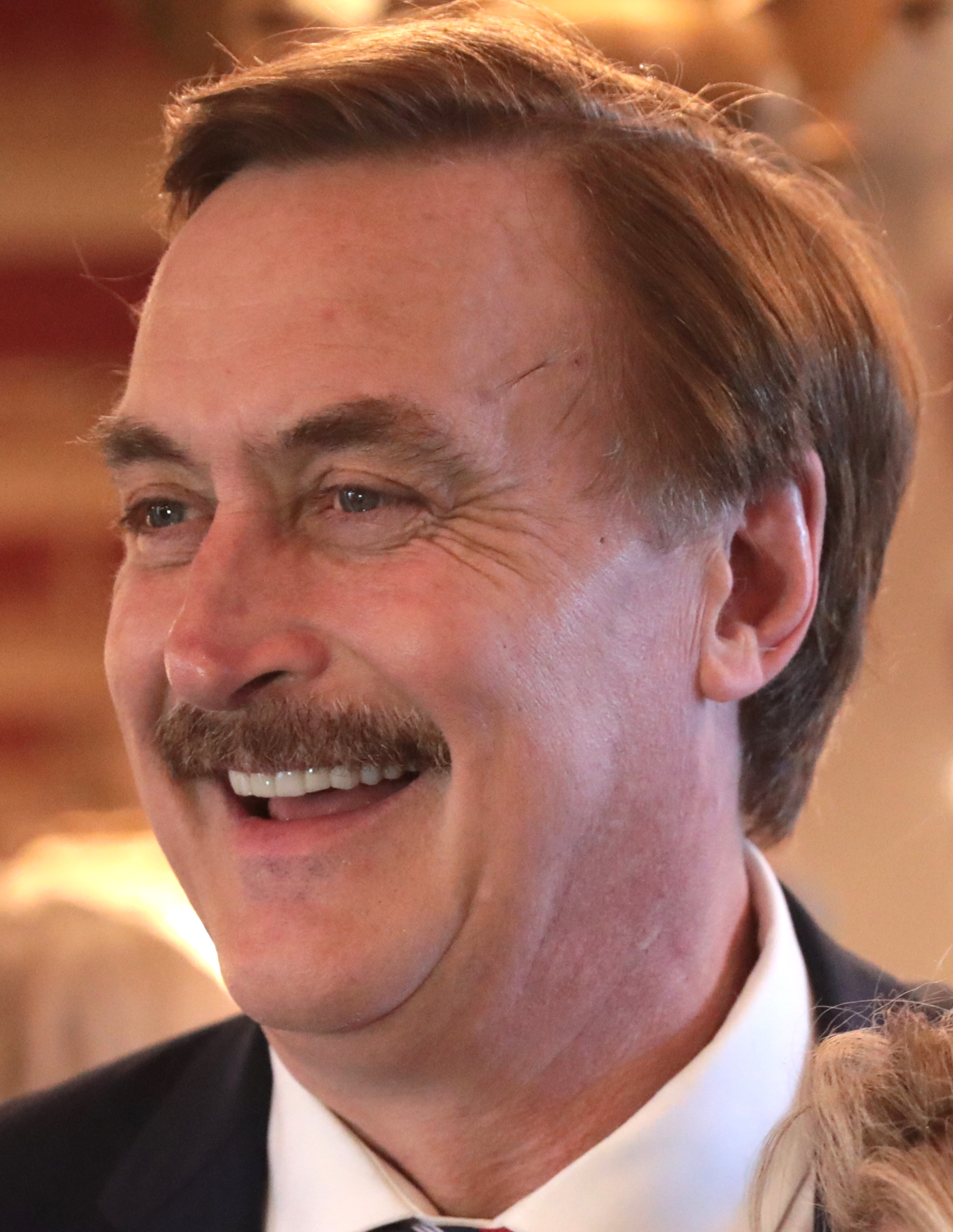
Mike Lindell

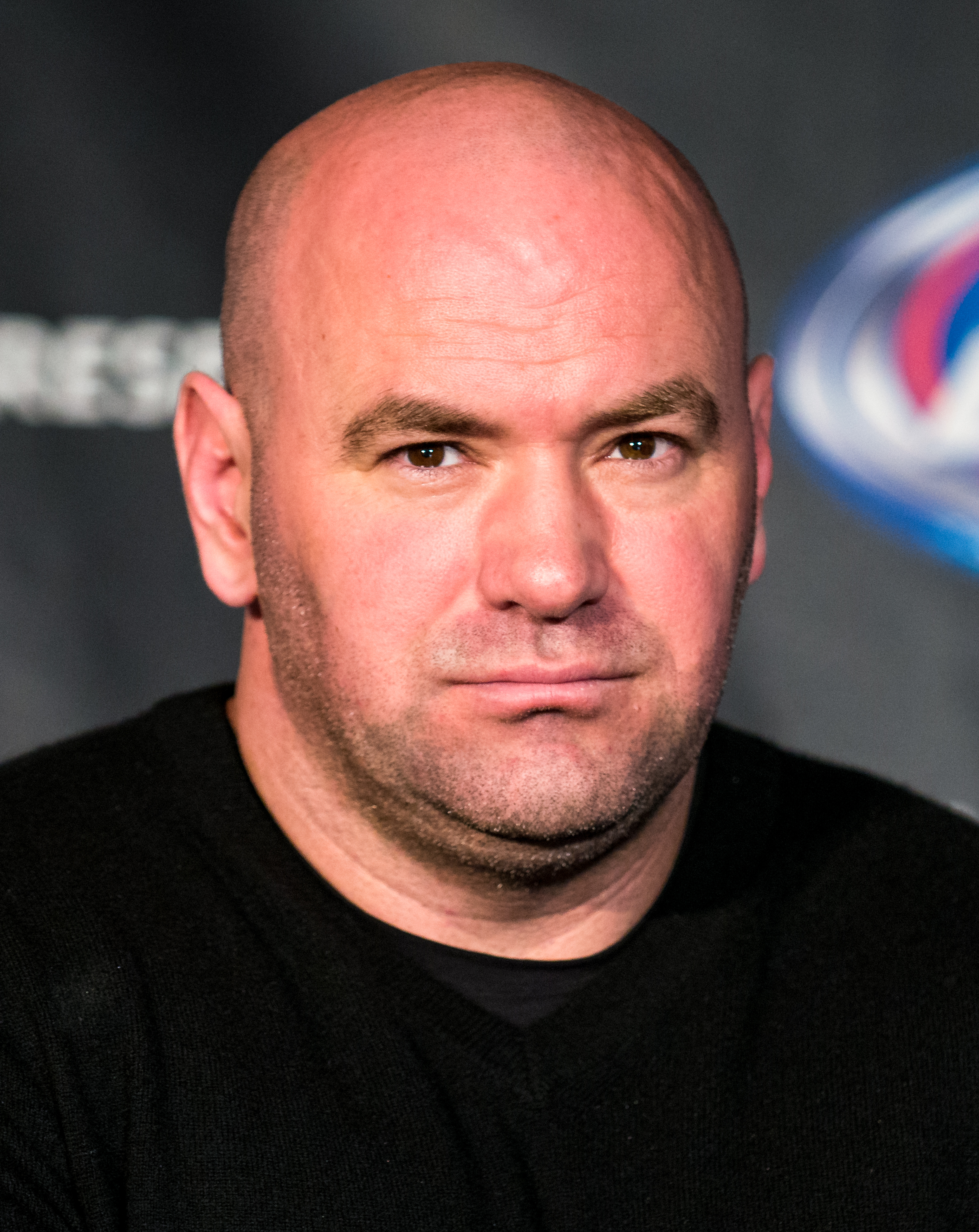
Dana White

- Miriam Adelson, philanthropist, doctor and wife of Sheldon Adelson
- Sheldon Adelson, founder and chairman of the Las Vegas Sands Corporation
- Jeff Ballabon, media executive and lobbyist
- Ronnie Barrett, gun manufacturer and CEO of Barrett Firearms Manufacturing
- Jordan Belfort, former stockbroker, convicted felon, author of The Wolf of Wall Street and motivational speaker
- Wayne Berman, businessman and senior managing director for government relations at The Blackstone Group
- Blair Brandt, real estate entrepreneur
- Flavio Briatore, Italian businessman
- Herman Cain, businessman, former chair of the Federal Reserve Bank of Kansas City and former 2000 and 2012 Republican presidential candidate (Deceased)
- John Catsimatidis, chairman and CEO of Gristedes
- Safra Catz, banker and CEO of Oracle Corporation
- Dan DeVos, businessman, sports executive
- James L. Dolan, executive chairman and CEO of The Madison Square Garden Company and executive chairman of MSG Networks
- Bob Dello Russo, businessman and golf course owner
- Dan Eberhart, CEO of Canary, LLC
- Tim Eyman, businessman
- Frank Fertitta III, CEO of Station Casinos
- Lorenzo Fertitta, director of Red Rock Resorts
- Tilman Fertitta, chairman, CEO, and sole owner of Landry's, Inc.
- William P. Foley, chairman of Fidelity National Financial and Black Knight Financial Services
- Charlie Gerow, CEO of Quantum Communications
- Keith Gilkes, political strategist
- Michael Glassner, president of C&M Transcontinental and political advisor
- Harold Hamm, oil and gas tycoon
- Charles Herbster, agribusiness executive
- Heather Higgins, businesswoman, CEO of Independent Women's Voice and chair of Independent Women's Forum
- William Hornbuckle, president and CEO of MGM Resorts International
- Charles B. Johnson, billionaire businessman
- Suhail A. Khan, director of external affairs at Microsoft
- Shalabh Kumar, industrialist
- Jimmy Lai, British Hong Kong entrepreneur and founder of Giordano, Next Digital and Apple Daily
- Mike Lindell, founder and CEO of My Pillow
- Nick Loeb, businessman and son of John Langeloth Loeb Jr.
- Howard Lorber, businessman, CEO of Vector Group and chair of Douglas Elliman and Nathan's Famous
- Palmer Luckey, entrepreneur and founder of Oculus VR
- Donald Luskin, chief investment officer of Trend Marcolytics LLC
- Howard Lutnick, chair and CEO of Cantor Fitzgerald
- John C. Malone, billionaire businessman, landowner and philanthropist
- Bernard Marcus, co-founder of Home Depot
- Blake Masters, venture capitalist and president of the Thiel Foundation
- Fernando Mateo, businessman and 2021 New York mayoral candidate (He would later lose in the Republican primary.)
- Wendy McCaw, businesswoman and owner of Santa Barbara News-Press
- Scott McNealy, businessman and CEO of Sun Microsystems
- Tim Michels, vice president of Michels Corporation
- Tom Monaghan, entrepreneur, founder of Domino's Pizza
- Arte Moreno, CEO of Outdoor Systems and owner of the Los Angeles Angels
- Robert Murray, founder and CEO of Murray Energy (Deceased)
- Terry Neese, businesswoman
- Dennis Nixon, CEO of International Bank of Commerce and chairman of International Bancshares Corporation
- Geoffrey Palmer, Los Angeles real estate developer
- Prem Parameswaran, president of Eros International’s North American operations
- John Paulson, hedge fund manager and founder of Paulson & Co.
- Nelson Peltz, businessman, chairman of The Wendy's Company and director of Legg Mason, Procter & Gamble, Sysco, and Madison Square Garden Sports
- John Pence, political consultant
- T. Boone Pickens, business magnate (Deceased)
- ~~Brock Pierce, director of the Bitcoin Foundation, former actor~~ (rescinded endorsement to start his own campaign)
- Andy Puzder, former CEO of CKE Restaurants
- Eddie Rispone, businessman and Republican candidate for the 2019 Louisiana gubernatorial election
- Stephen Ross, owner of the Miami Dolphins and chairman of The Related Companies
- Larry Rubin, Mexican-American businessman and president of The American Society of Mexico
- Phil Ruffin, owner of the Treasure Island Hotel and Casino and Circus Circus Hotel & Casino
- Ned Ryun, CEO of American Majority
- John Schnatter, founder and former CEO of Papa John's Pizza
- Jeffrey Shockey, lobbyist
- Lisa Song Sutton, entrepreneur and real estate investor
- Dean Stoecker, CEO of Alteryx
- Peter Thiel, entrepreneur, president of Clarium Capital and co-founder of PayPal and Palantir Technologies
- Donald Trump Jr., businessman, former reality television personality and son of Donald Trump
- Eric Trump, businessman, former reality television personality and son of Donald Trump
- Tiffany Trump, socialite and daughter of Donald Trump
- JD Vance, venture capitalist
- Kelcy Warren, businessman and CEO of Energy Transfer Partners
- Dana White, businessman and president of the Ultimate Fighting Championship
- Dede Wilsey, philanthropist and socialite
- Cindy Yang, businesswoman

== Actors and actresses ==
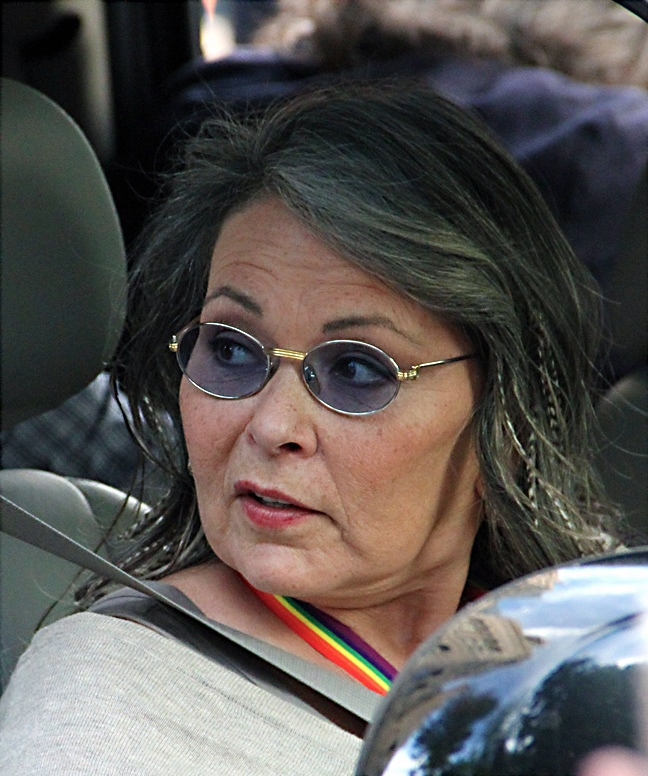
Roseanne Barr

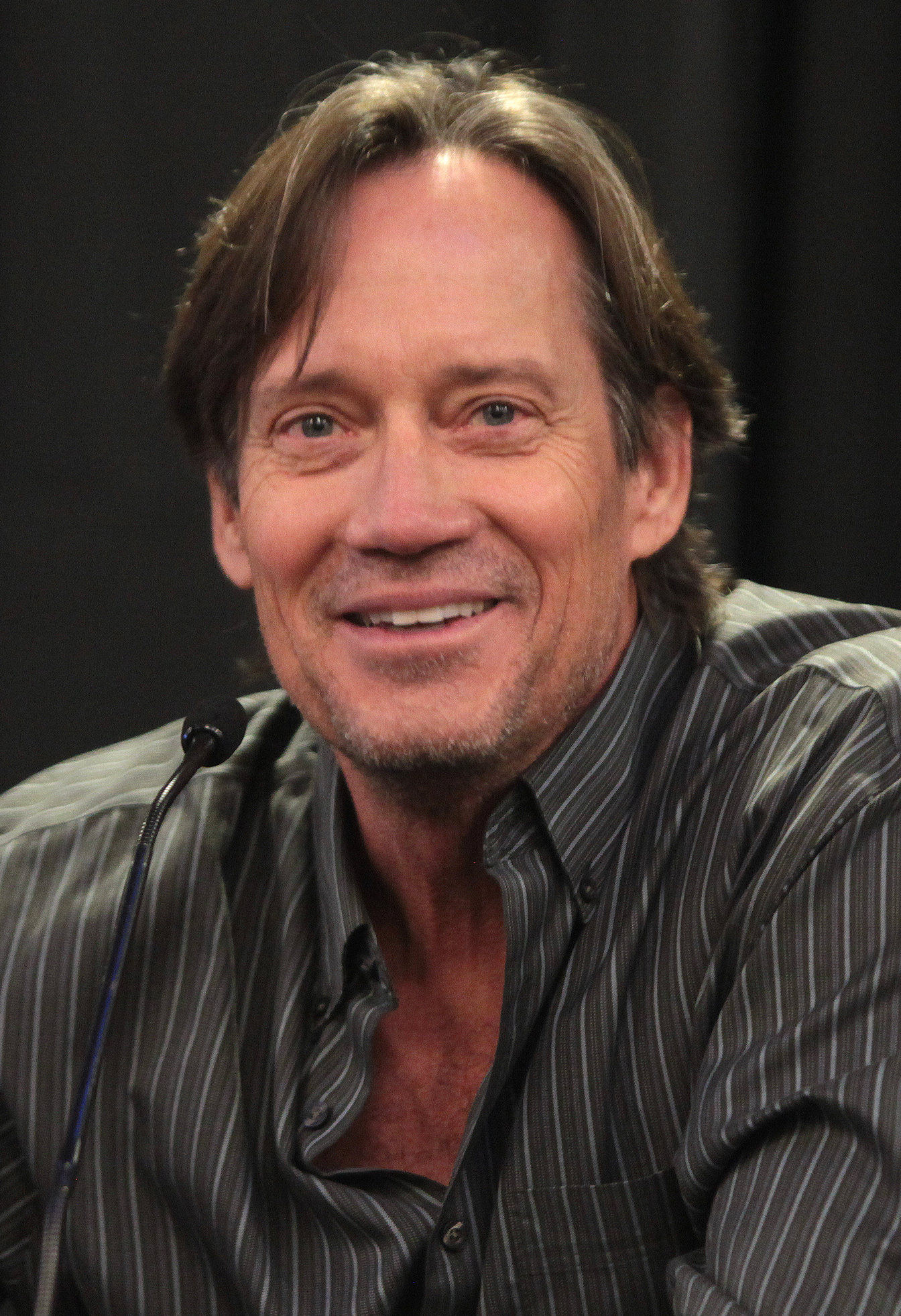
Kevin Sorbo

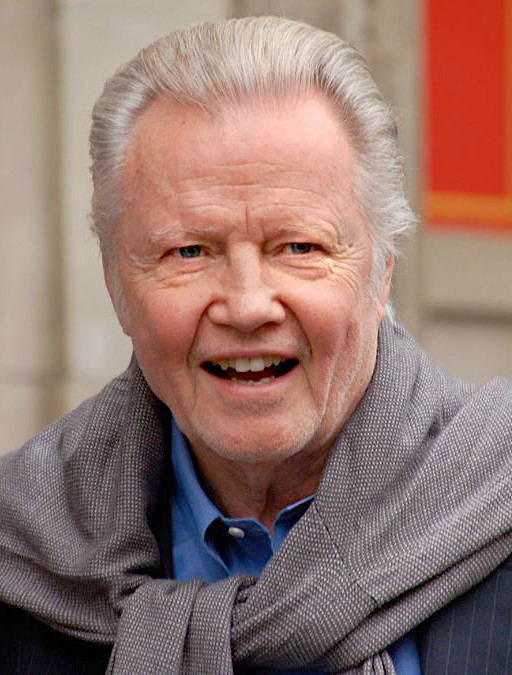
Jon Voight

- Kirstie Alley
- María Conchita Alonso
- Samaire Armstrong
- Scott Baio
- Stephen Baldwin
- Roseanne Barr
- Jim Breuer
- Dean Cain
- Stacey Dash
- Jim Caviezel
- Lucas Black
- Robert Davi
- Laurence Fox
- Vincent Gallo
- Kelsey Grammer
- Namrata Singh Gujral
- Yaphet Kotto
- Lorenzo Lamas
- Artie Lange
- Brandi Love
- Lila Morillo
- Chonda Pierce
- Joe Piscopo
- Dennis Quaid
- Randy Quaid
- Antonio Sabàto Jr.
- Rick Schroder
- Suzanne Somers
- Kevin Sorbo
- Sam Sorbo
- Ben Stein
- Kristy Swanson
- Carolina Tejera
- Eduardo Verástegui
- Jon Voight
- Isaiah Washington
- James Woods
- Veronica Yip

== Television personalities ==
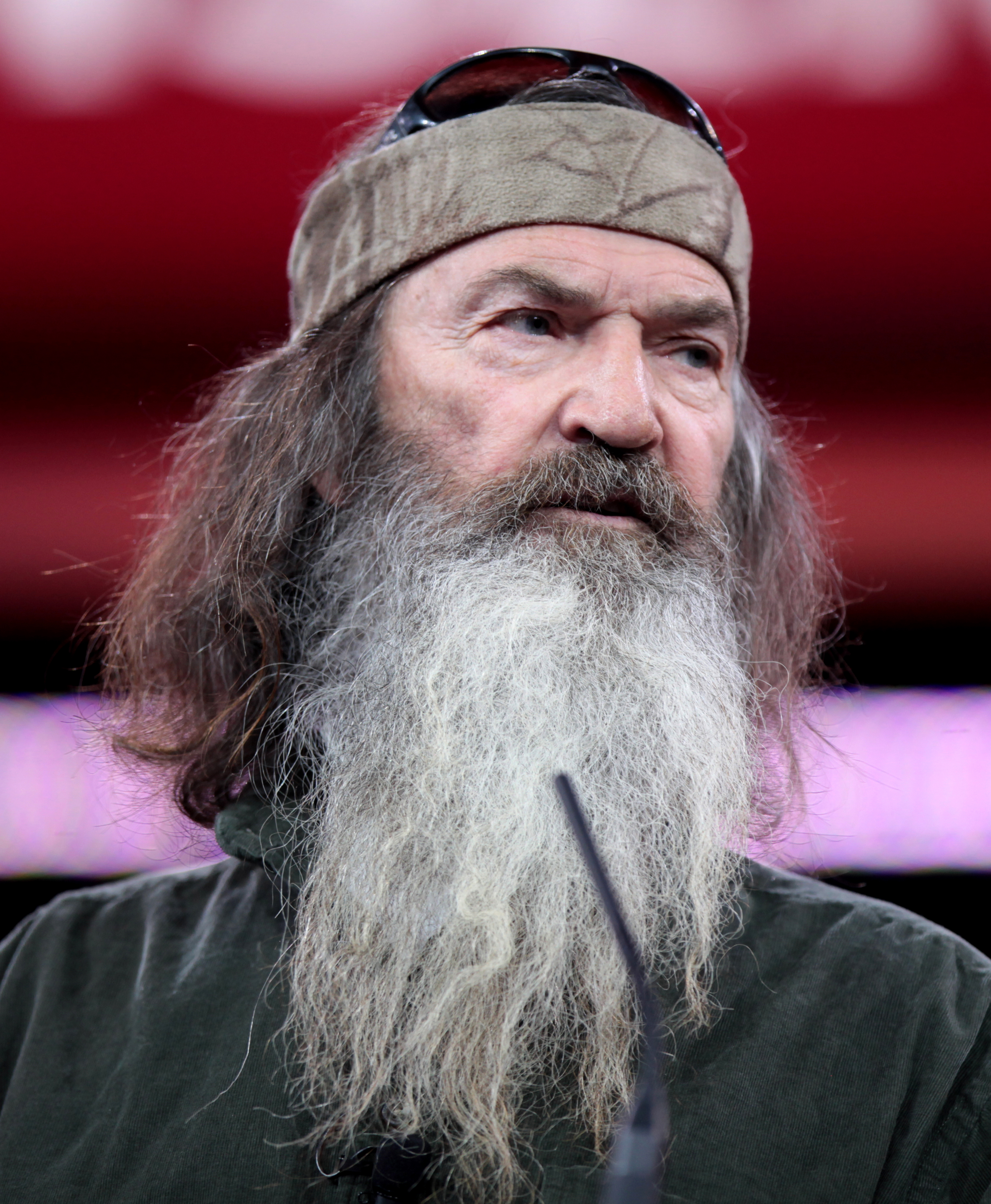
Phil Robertson

- Rachel Campos-Duffy, television personality
- Cepillín, Mexican clown
- Naked Cowboy, singer and street performer
- Jana Duggar, reality TV personality
- Jenelle Evans, reality TV personality
- Pete Evans, Australian chef, author, TV presenter
- Rick Harrison, reality TV personality
- Mary Hart, former host of Entertainment Tonight
- Elisabeth Hasselbeck, retired TV personality, talk show host
- Pete Hegseth, television host
- Lady MAGA, drag queen
- Carol McGiffin, British TV presenter
- Elizabeth Pipko, model, author, founder of Jexodus
- Carrie Prejean, model, former beauty queen
- Willie Robertson, reality TV personality on Duck Dynasty, CEO of Duck Commander
- Andre Soriano, reality television star, fashion designer
- Chuck Woolery, former game show host, talk show host

== Musicians ==
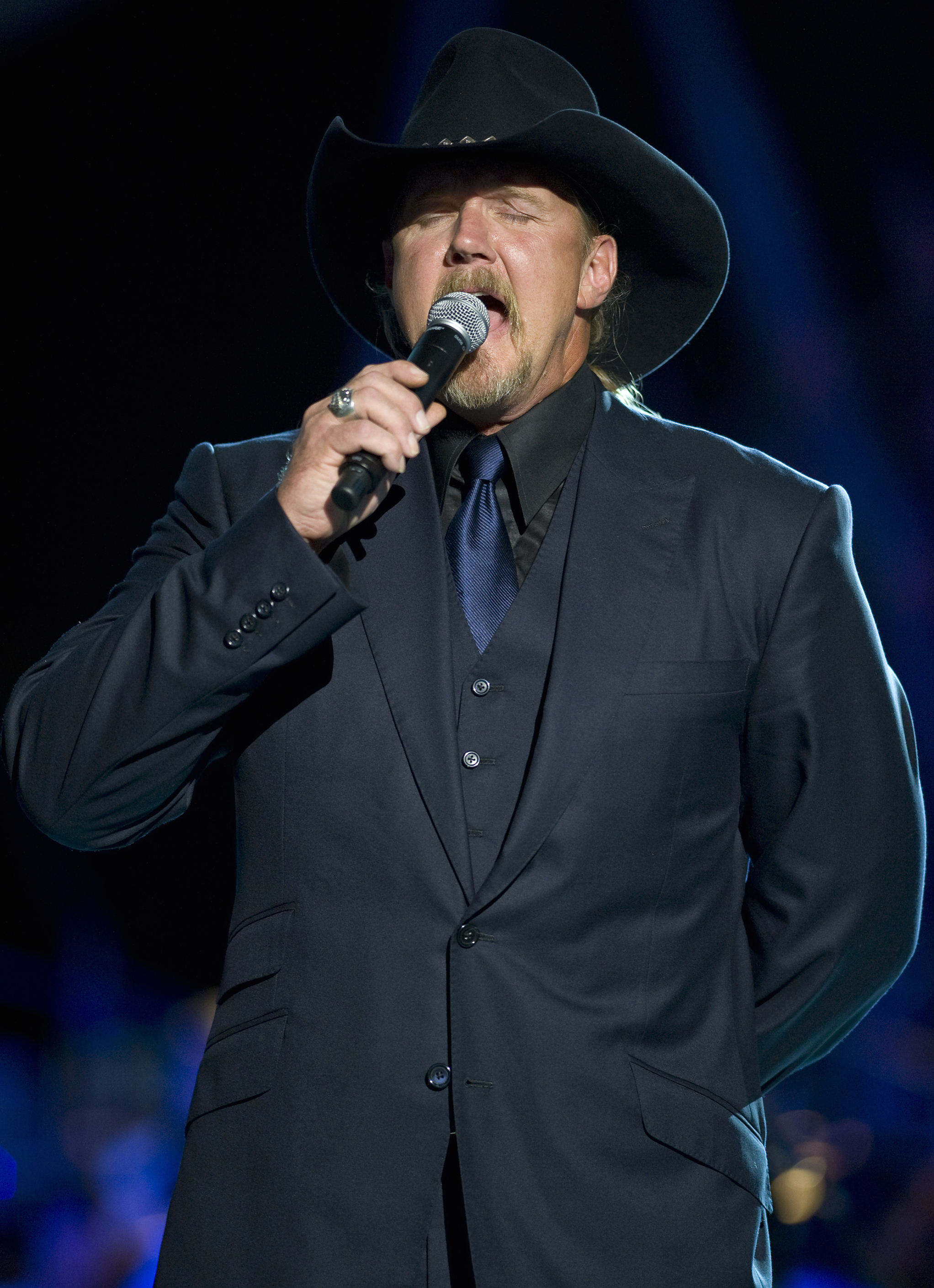
Trace Adkins

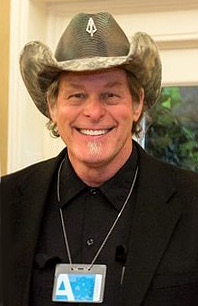
Ted Nugent

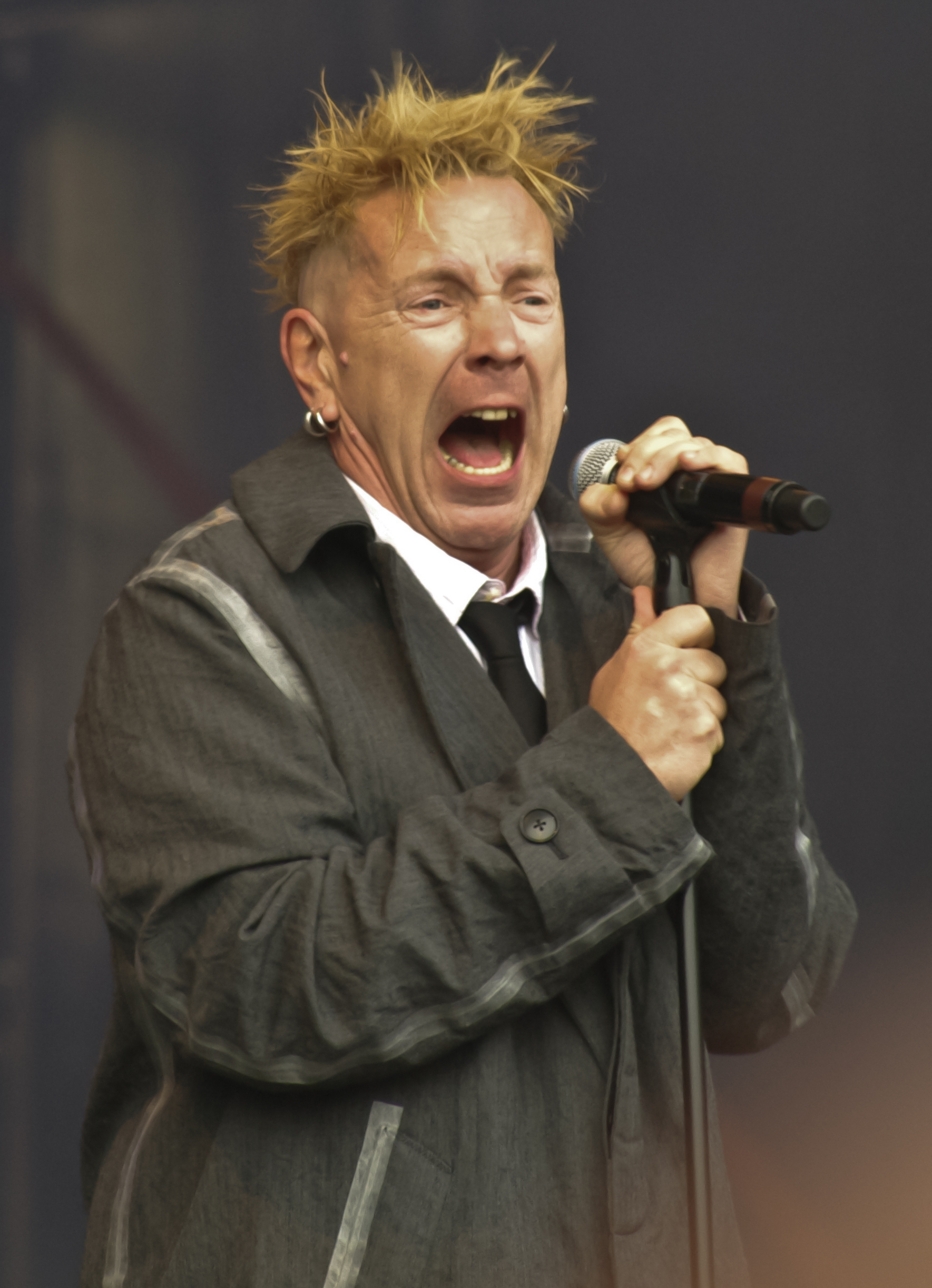
Johnny Rotten

- ~~50 Cent~~ (switched endorsement to Biden)
- 6ix9ine
- Trace Adkins
- Skunk Baxter
- Kodak Black
- Fivio Foreign
- Chingo Bling
- Pat Boone
- Jonathan Cain
- Eric Carmen
- Willie Colón
- Asian Doll
- John Dolmayan
- Polow da Don
- Terry Fator
- Sean Feucht
- Ace Frehley
- Richie Furay
- Danny Gokey
- Michale Graves
- Lee Greenwood
- Jaheim
- Kaya Jones
- Brian Kelley
- Lil Pump
- Aaron Lewis
- Lil Wayne
- Mike Love
- Lillibeth Morillo
- Paty Navidad
- Wayne Newton
- Ted Nugent
- Styles P
- Ricky Rebel
- Kid Rock
- Liliana Rodríguez
- Johnny Rotten
- Yaakov Shwekey
- Steve Souza
- Michael Sweet
- Michael Tait
- Travis Tritt
- Tommy Vext
- Joy Villa
- Waka Flocka Flame
- Beri Weber
- ~~Kanye West~~ (rescinded endorsement to start his own campaign)

== Sports figures ==
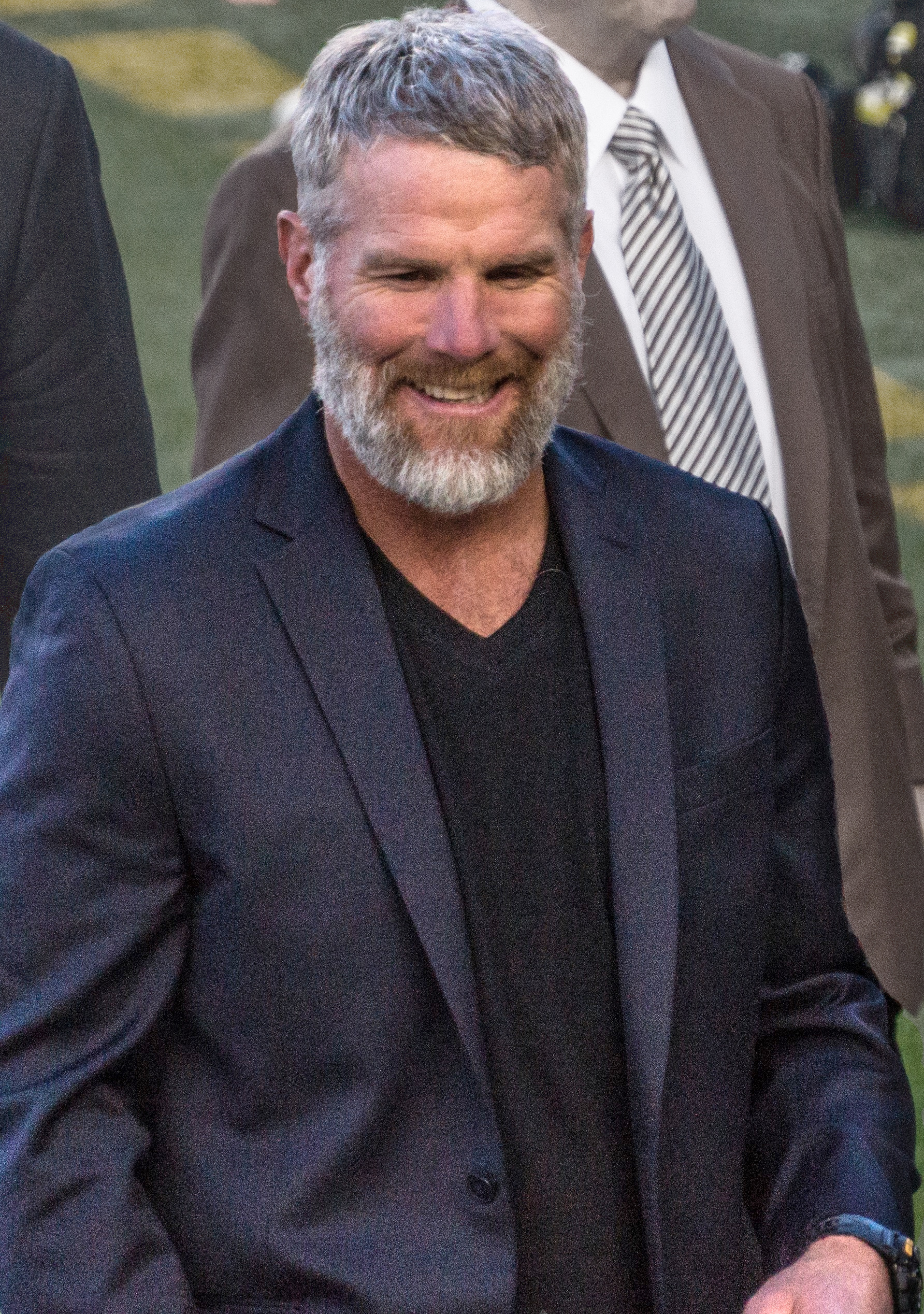
Brett Favre

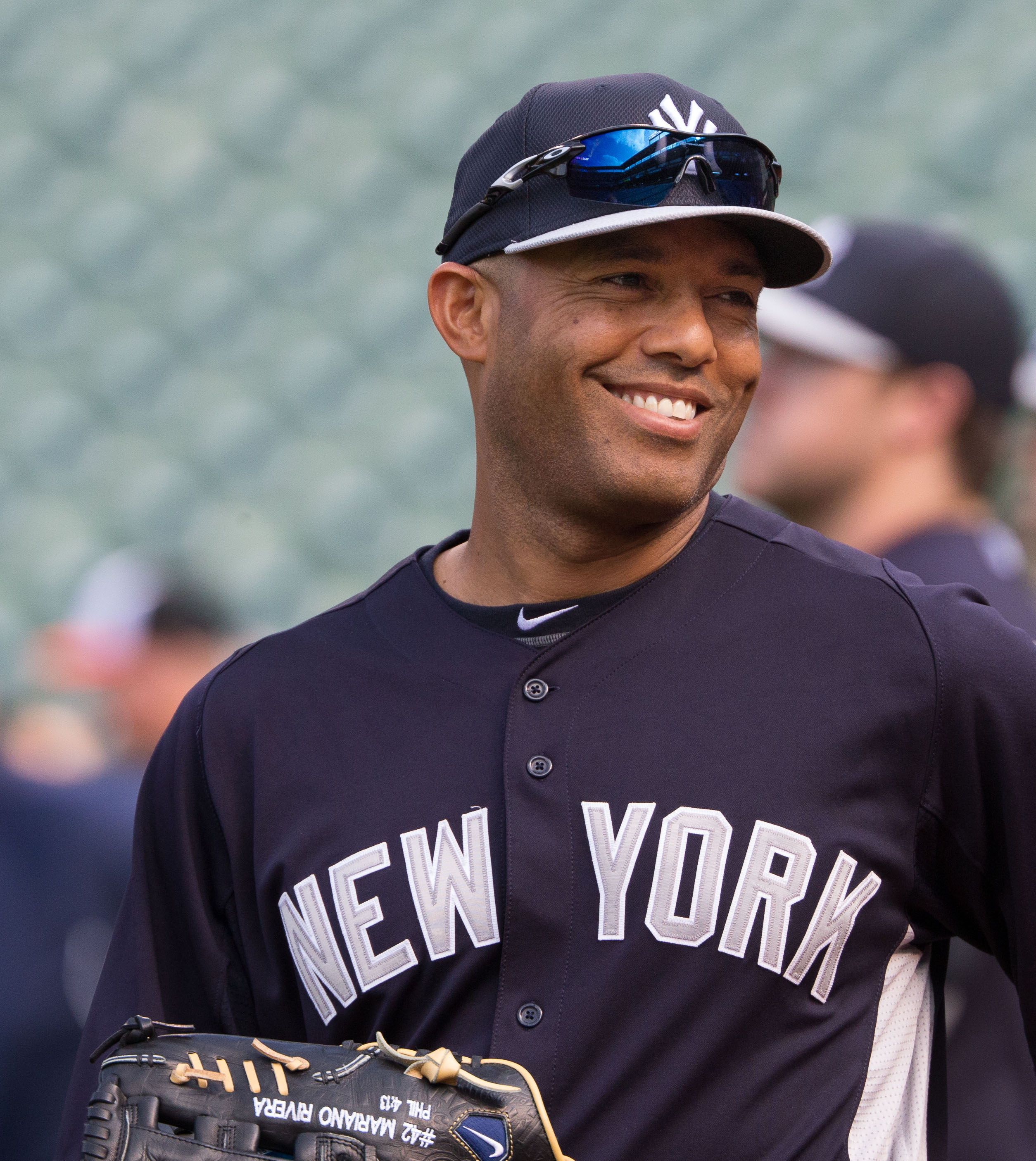
Mariano Rivera

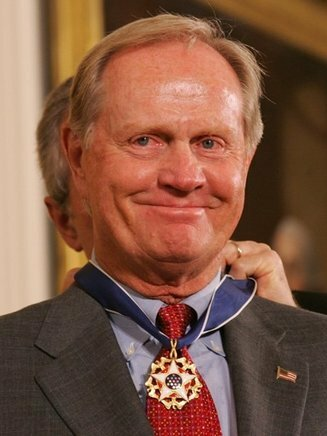
Jack Nicklaus

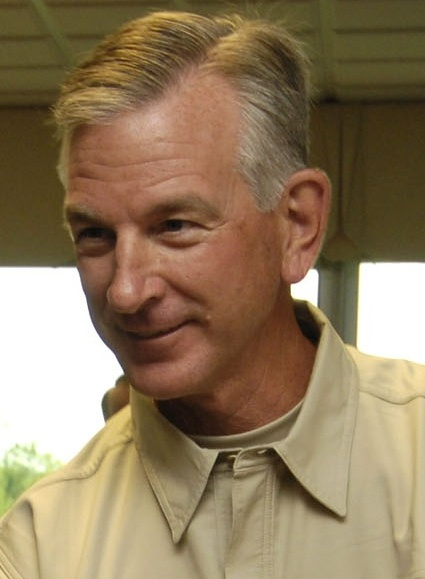
Tommy Tuberville

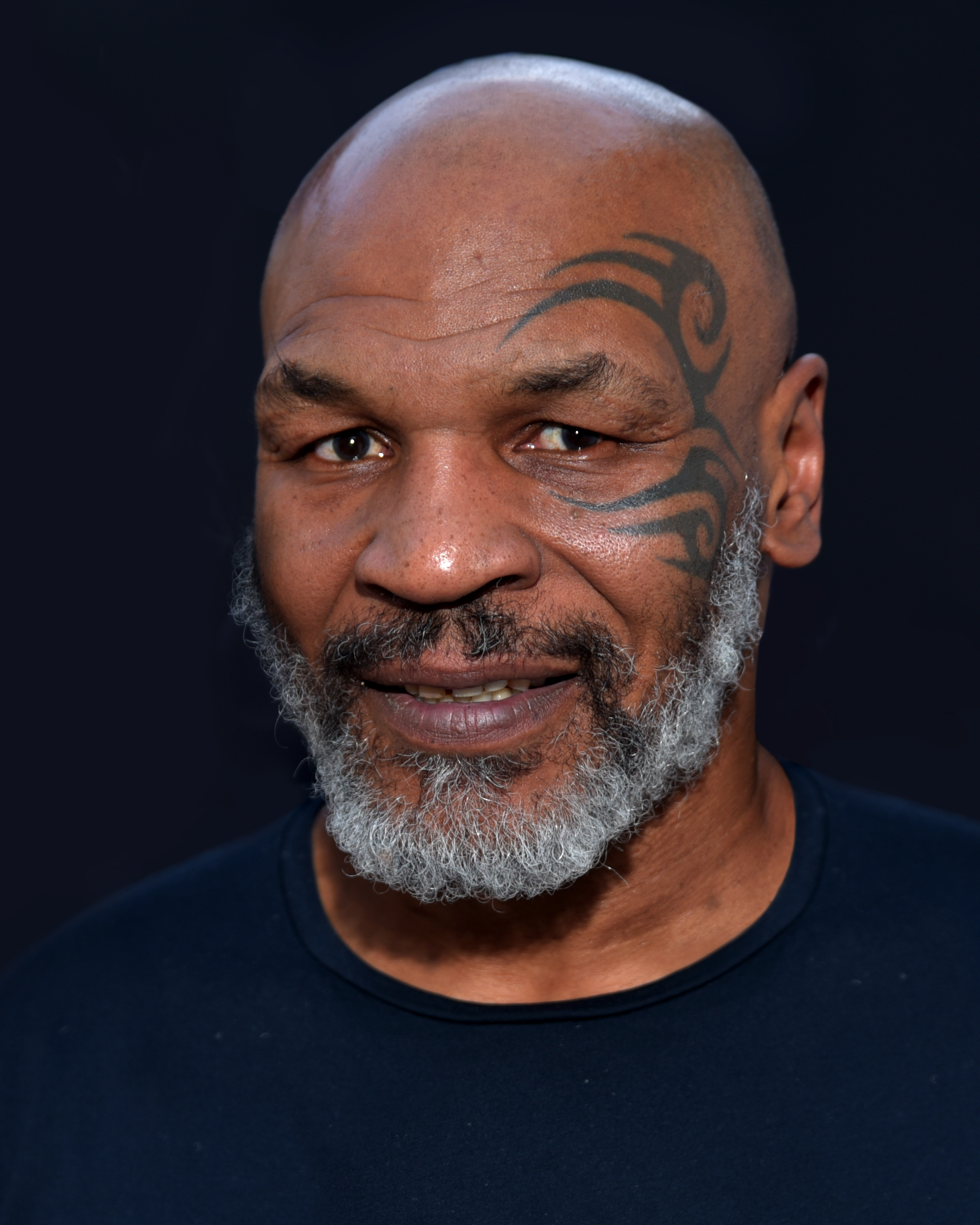
Mike Tyson

=== American football ===
- Rita Benson LeBlanc, former vice chairman of the board of the New Orleans Saints
- Bobby Bowden, retired college football coach for the Florida State Seminoles football team
- Jack Brewer, former National Football League player
- Jim Brown, former fullback for the Cleveland Browns
- Mike Brown, executive and owner of the Cincinnati Bengals
- Jay Cutler, former professional football player
- John Elway, former professional football player, president and manager of the Denver Broncos
- Brett Favre, former professional football player
- Mike Ditka, retired NFL coach
- Lou Holtz, former football player, coach, and analyst
- Richie Incognito, professional football player
- Ed Orgeron, college football coach who served at Louisiana State University
- Burgess Owens, retired football player and 2020 Republican nominee for the U.S. House in Utah’s 4th district (He would later win said election.)
- Maurkice Pouncey, former professional football player
- Mike Shula, quarterbacks coach for the Denver Broncos
- Dimitrious Stanley, former professional football player
- Tommy Tuberville, former football player, coach, and 2020 Republican U.S. Senate nominee in Alabama (He would later win said election.)
- Michael Turk, punter for the Sun Devils
- Herschel Walker, former professional football player

=== Baseball ===
- Patrick Corbin, professional baseball pitcher for the Washington Nationals
- Johnny Damon, former Major League Baseball player
- Sean Gilmartin, Major League Baseball player
- Aubrey Huff, former Major League Baseball player
- Mike Piazza, former professional baseball catcher
- Mariano Rivera, former baseball pitcher for the New York Yankees
- Curt Schilling, former professional baseball pitcher
- Darryl Strawberry, former professional Major League Baseball player
- Kurt Suzuki, baseball catcher for the Los Angeles Angels
- David Wells, former professional baseball pitcher
- Joe West, Major League Baseball umpire

=== Basketball ===
- Jim Buss, part-owner and former executive vice president of basketball operations of the Los Angeles Lakers
- Bob Cousy, retired professional basketball player

=== Boxing ===
- Don King, boxing promoter
- Mike Tyson, former professional boxer

=== Motorsport ===
- Richard Childress, former professional stock car racing driver and owner of Richard Childress Racing
- Timmy Hill, professional stock car racing driver
- Carl Long, professional stock car racing driver and owner of MBM Motorsports
- Corey LaJoie, professional stock car racing driver
- Roger Penske, businessman and entrepreneur involved in professional auto racing, retired professional auto racing driver
- Jack Roush, founder, CEO, and co-owner of Roush Fenway Racing
- Tim Viens, professional stock car racing driver
- Austin Wayne Self, professional stock car racing driver

=== Golf ===
- John Daly, professional golfer
- Ginger Howard, professional golfer
- Jack Nicklaus, retired professional golfer
- Greg Norman, Australian professional golfer and entrepreneur

=== Ice hockey ===
- Todd Bertuzzi, former professional ice hockey player
- Ilya Bryzgalov, former Russian professional ice hockey goaltender
- Don Cherry, ice hockey commentator, former professional ice hockey player and head coach
- Tony DeAngelo, professional ice hockey player
- Peter Karmanos Jr., minority owner and alternate governor of the Carolina Hurricanes hockey franchise
- Ryan Kesler, professional ice hockey player
- Bobby Orr, former professional ice hockey player
- Ryan Poehling, professional ice hockey player
- Alexander Radulov, Russian professional ice hockey player

=== Mixed martial arts ===
- Ali Abdelaziz, Egyptian mixed martial arts manager
- Andrei Arlovski, professional mixed martial artist
- Henry Cejudo, Olympic medalist in freestyle wrestling and retired mixed martial artist
- Colby Covington, professional mixed martial artist
- Justin Gaethje, professional mixed martial artist
- Cody Law, professional mixed martial artist
- Héctor Lombard, professional mixed martial artist
- Jorge Masvidal, professional mixed martial artist
- Pat Miletech, retired professional mixed martial artist
- Conor McGregor, professional mixed martial artist
- Tito Ortiz, professional mixed martial artist

=== Other ===
- Lanny Barnes, biathlete
- María Gabriela Franco, Venezuelan sport shooter and Olympic athlete
- Rob Jones, Paralympic medalist in rowing and U.S. Marine Corps veteran
- Klete Keller, Olympic medalist in freestyle swimming
- Mike Matusow, professional poker player
- Kim Rhode, Olympic medalist in double trap
- Rick Roeber, long-distance runner
- Quinn Simmons, cyclist

=== Wrestling ===
- Mark Calaway, aka The Undertaker, retired WWE legend
- Road Dogg, retired WWE wrestler
- Dan Gable, Olympic medalist in freestyle wrestling
- Jake Hager, professional mixed martial artist, current AEW and former WWE wrestler
- Chris Jericho, current AEW and former WWE wrestler
- Sean Morley, retired WWE wrestler
- Dan Rodimer, former professional wrestler and Republican nominee for Nevada's 3rd congressional district in the 2020 elections (He would later lose said election.)
- Jaxson Ryker, former WWE wrestler
- Kane, retired WWE legend and mayor of Knox County, Tennessee

== Academic figures and scholars ==
- Mor Altshuler, Israeli scholar and author
- A.D. Amar, scholar, researcher and management professor at Seton Hall University
- Hadley Arkes, political scientist and James Wilson Institute on Natural Rights & the American Founding
- Larry P. Arnn, president of Hillsdale College
- Mark Bauerlein, professor of English at Emory University
- Jay Bergman, professor of Russian History at Central Connecticut State University
- Russell Berman, professor of German studies and comparative literature at Stanford University
- Sanjai Bhagat, economist and Provost Professor of Finance at the Leeds School of Business
- Walter Block, Harold E. Wirth Eminent Scholar Endowed Chair in Economics at the School of Business at Loyola University New Orleans
- Daniel Bonevac, professor of philosophy at University of Texas at Austin
- Robert Bradley Jr, economist and founder of Institute for Energy Research
- Jennifer S. Bryson, Communication Fellow at Claremont Institute
- Frank H. Buckley, professor at the Antonin Scalia Law School
- Tony Campbell, professor of political science at Towson University
- Allan C. Carlson, former professor at Hillsdale College and president emeritus of the Howard Center for Family, Religion and Society
- Angelo M. Codevilla, professor emeritus of international relations at Frederick S. Pardee School of Global Studies at Boston University
- Christopher Demuth, lawyer and Distinguished Fellow at Hudson Institute
- John C. Eastman, professor of law at the Chapman University School of Law
- Bruce P. Frohnen, professor of law at Ohio Northern University College of Law
- David Gelernter, professor of computer science at Yale University and Unabomber victim
- Paul Gottfried, Paleoconservative philosopher, historian, columnist and former Horace Raffensperger Professor of Humanities in Elizabethtown College
- Paul Roderick Gregory, professor of economics at the University of Houston
- Earl Grinols, economist and political scientist at Baylor University
- Mark David Hall, Herbert Hoover Distinguished Professor of Politics and Faculty Fellow in the William Penn Honors Program at George Fox University
- Victor Davis Hanson, professor emeritus of classics at California State University, Fresno, the Martin and Illie Anderson Senior Fellow in classics and military history at Stanford University's Hoover Institution
- William Happer, professor emeritus of physics at Princeton University
- Steven Hayward, senior resident scholar at the Institute of Governmental Studies at UC Berkeley and Senior Fellow at the Pacific Research Institute
- He Qinglian, Chinese economist
- John D. Johnson, former professor at the Jon M. Huntsman School of Business
- Charles R. Kesler, professor of government at Claremont McKenna College and Claremont Graduate University
- Sergiu Klainerman, mathematician and professor of mathematics at Princeton University
- Robert C. Koons, professor of philosophy at the University of Texas
- Michael I. Krauss, professor of law at George Mason University
- Stanley Kurtz, Senior Fellow at the Ethics and Public Policy Center
- Arthur Laffer, economist
- Michael Ledeen, foreign policy analyst and historian
- Thomas K. Lindsay, former president at Shimer College
- John R. Lott Jr., economist and gun rights advocate
- Kevin MacDonald, retired professor of psychology at California State University, Long Beach and conspiracy theorist
- Joyce Lee Malcolm, Patrick Henry Professor of constitutional law and the second amendment at the Antonin Scalia Law School
- Theodore Roosevelt Malloch, professor of strategic leadership and governance at the Henley Business School
- Javier Milei, Argentine economist and author
- Peter Morici, economist and retired professor of international business at the University of Maryland, College Park
- Robert L. Paquette, former professor of American history at Hamilton College and co-founder of the Alexander Hamilton Institute for the Study of Western Civilization
- Ronald J. Pestritto, professor of politics at Hillsdale College
- James Piereson, scholar and president of the William E. Simon Foundation
- Juliana Geran Pilon, senior fellow at the Alexander Hamilton Institute for the Study of Western Civilization
- Everett Piper, former president of Oklahoma Wesleyan University
- Daniel Pipes, historian, writer and president of the Middle East Forum
- Paul Rahe, professor of history at Hillsdale College
- Glenn Reynolds, Beauchamp Brogan Distinguished Professor of Law at the University of Tennessee College of Law
- Timothy P. Roth, A.B. Templeton Professor and chairman of the Department of Economics and Finance at the University of Texas at El Paso
- Paul Rubin, economist and Samuel Candler Dobbs Professor of Economics Emeritus at Emory University
- Fred Siegel, senior fellow at the Manhattan Institute for Policy Research and history professor at Cooper Union
- Barry S. Strauss, professor of history and classics at Cornell University
- Chin Wan, Hong Kong scholar and activist
- Robert Weissberg, professor emeritus of political science at the University of Illinois
- Peter Wood, president of the National Association of Scholars
- Xia Yeliang, former associate professor of economics at Peking University

== Activists and public figures ==
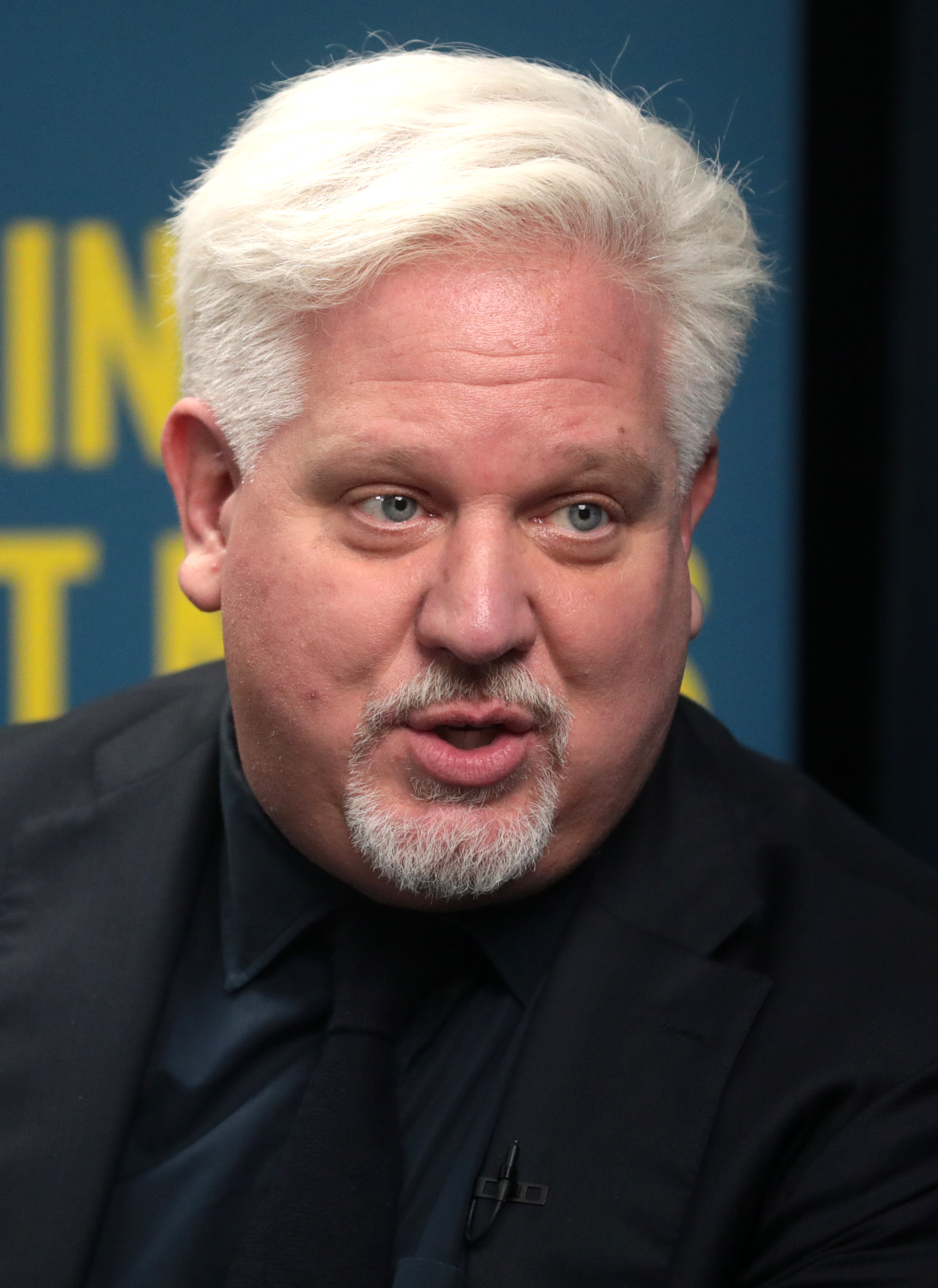
Glenn Beck

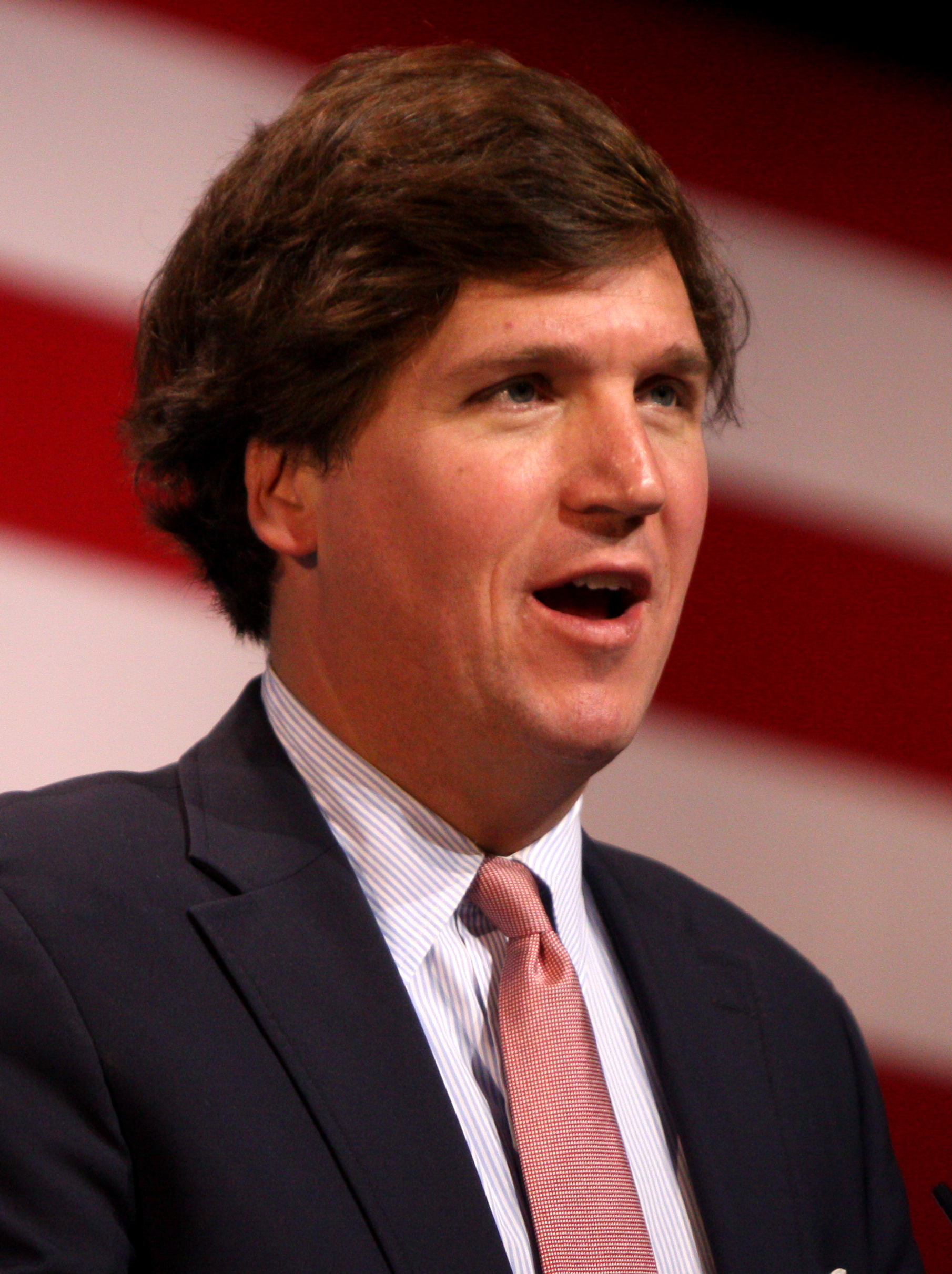
Tucker Carlson

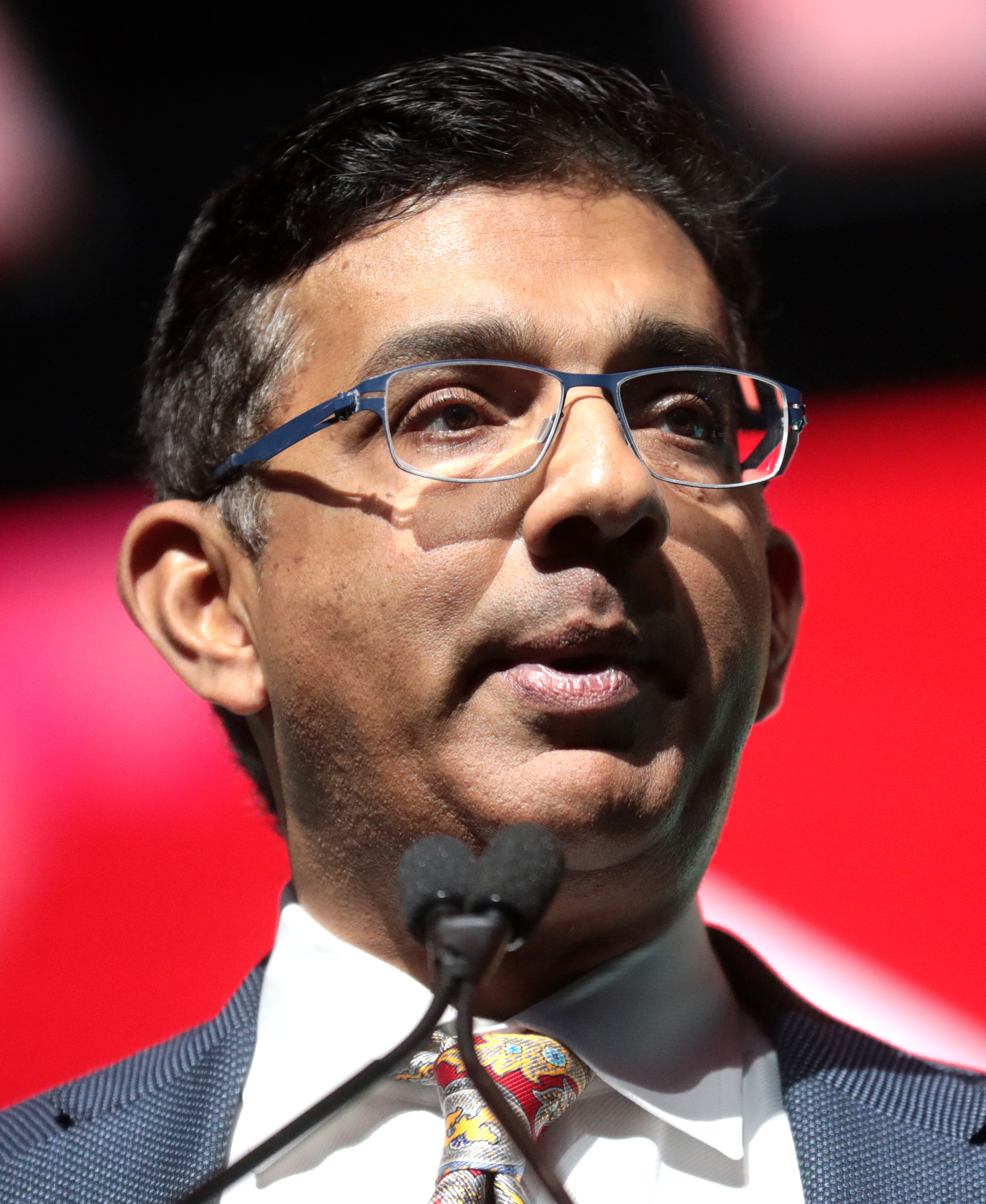
Dinesh D'Souza

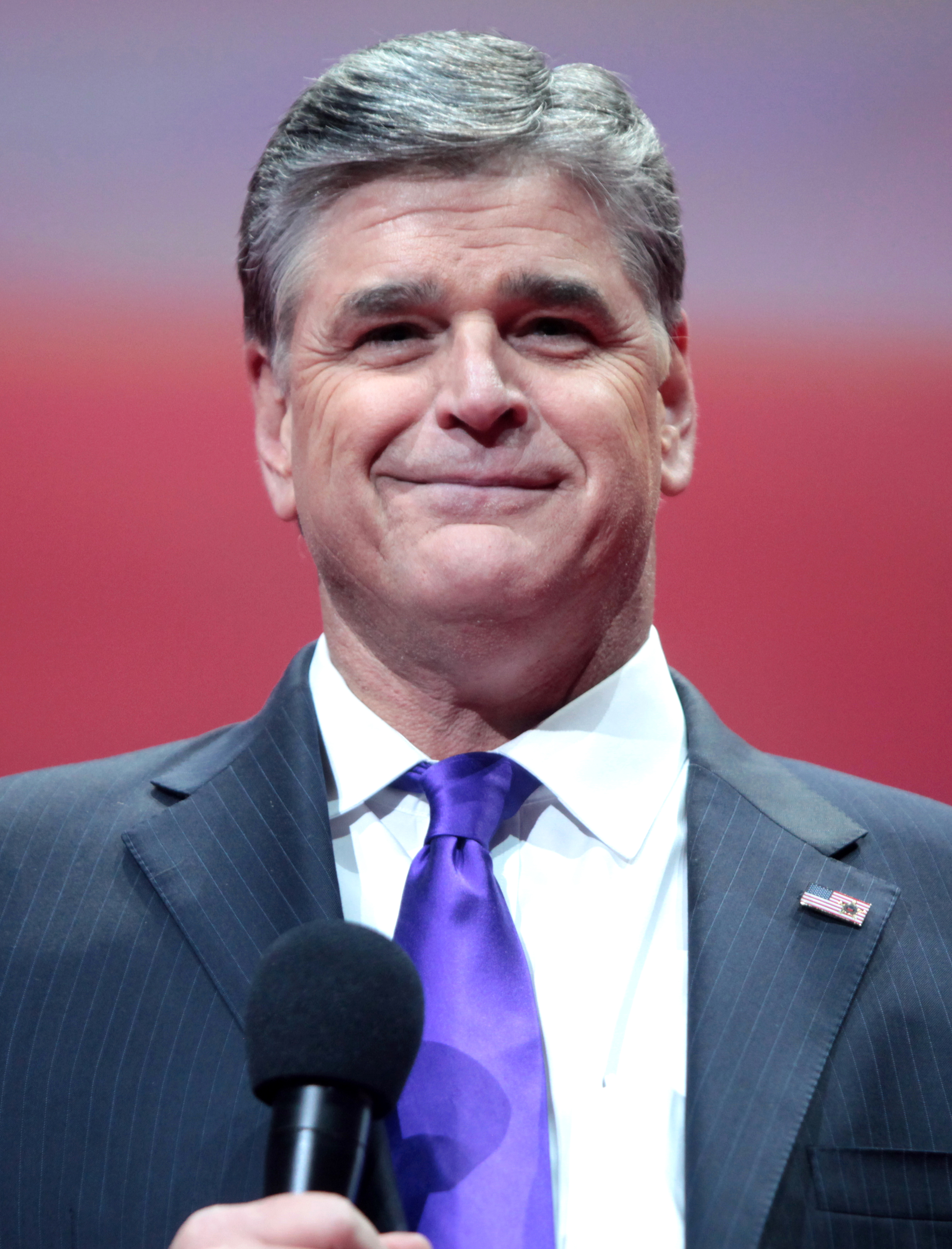
Sean Hannity

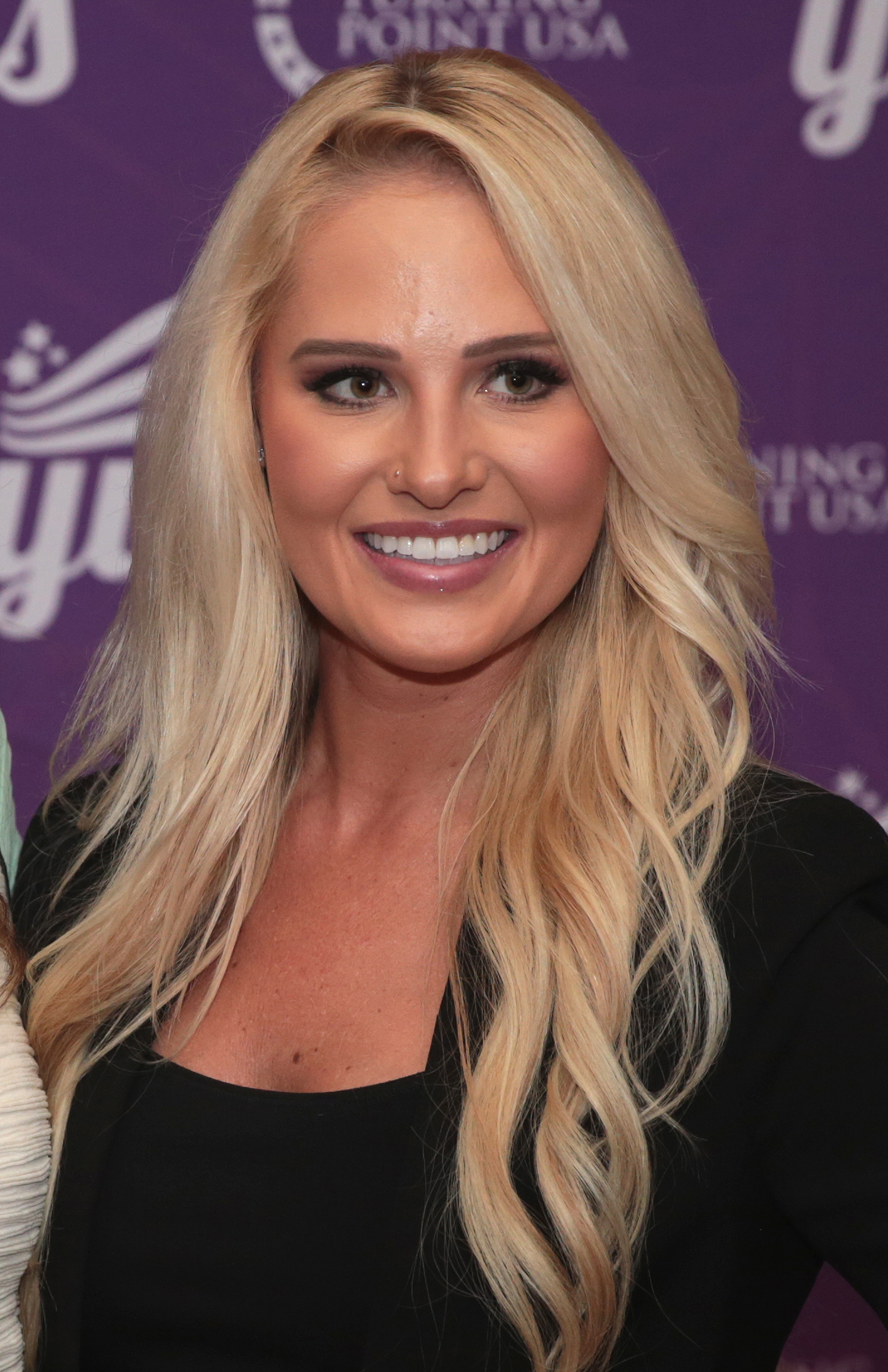
Tomi Lahren

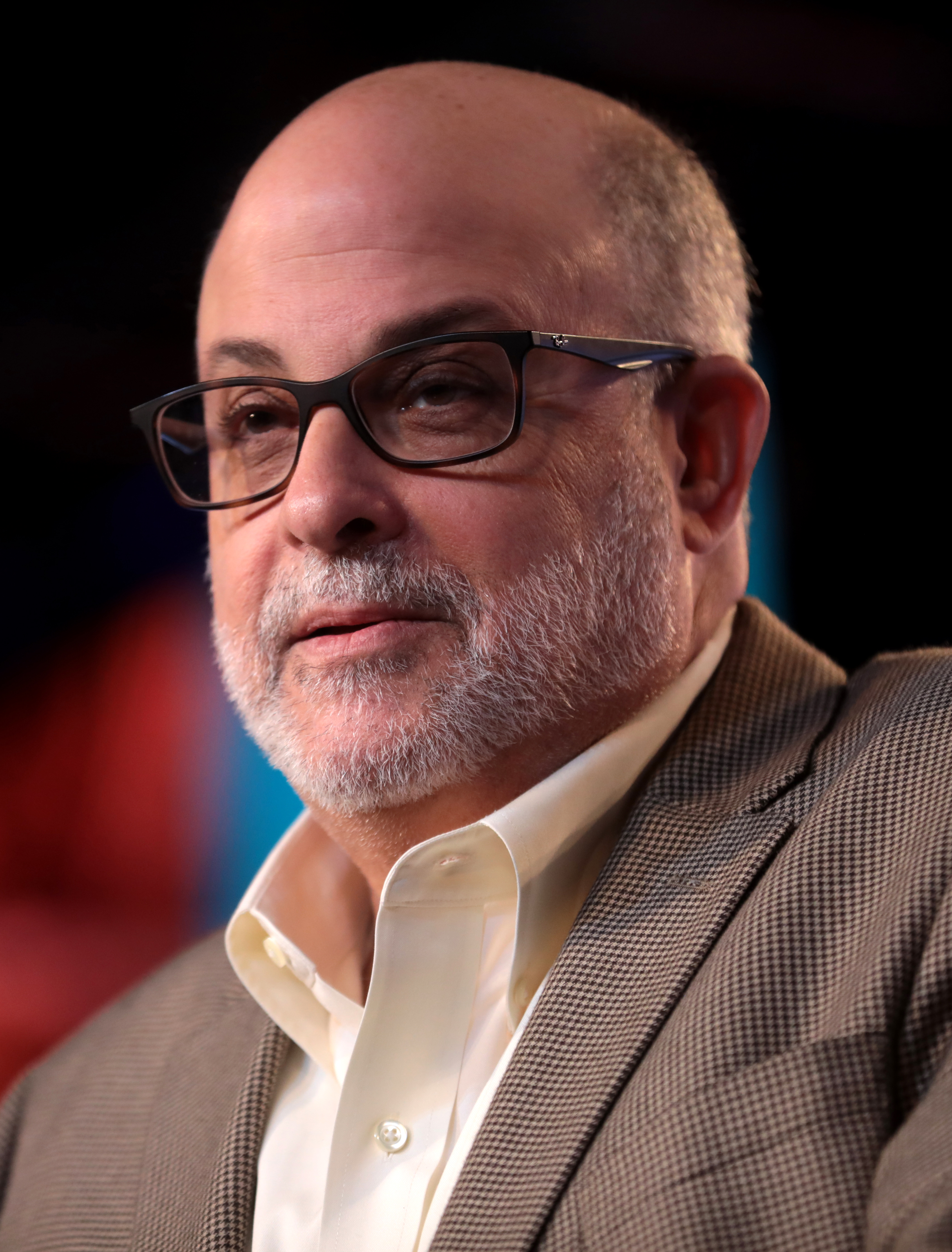
Mark Levin

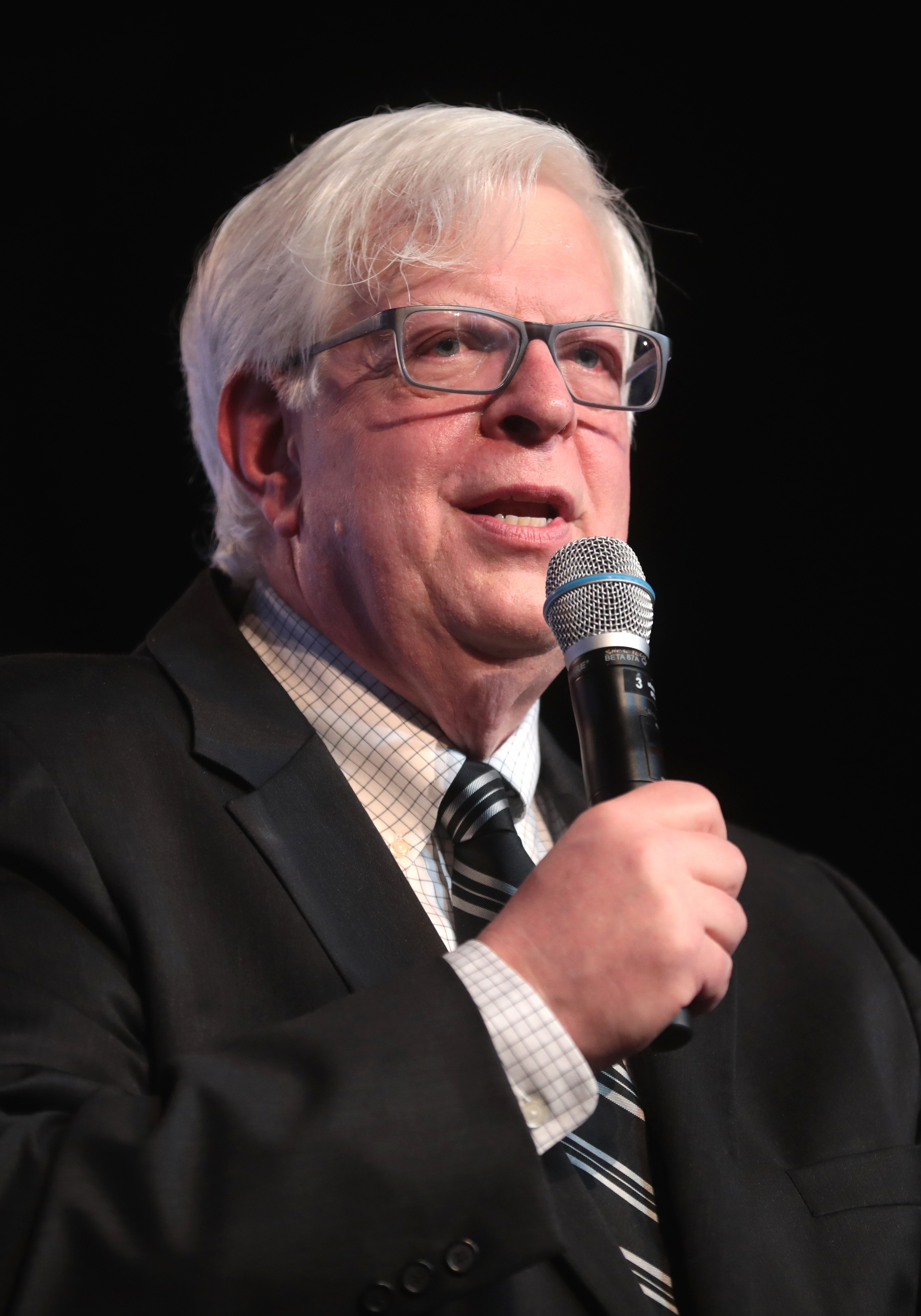
Dennis Prager

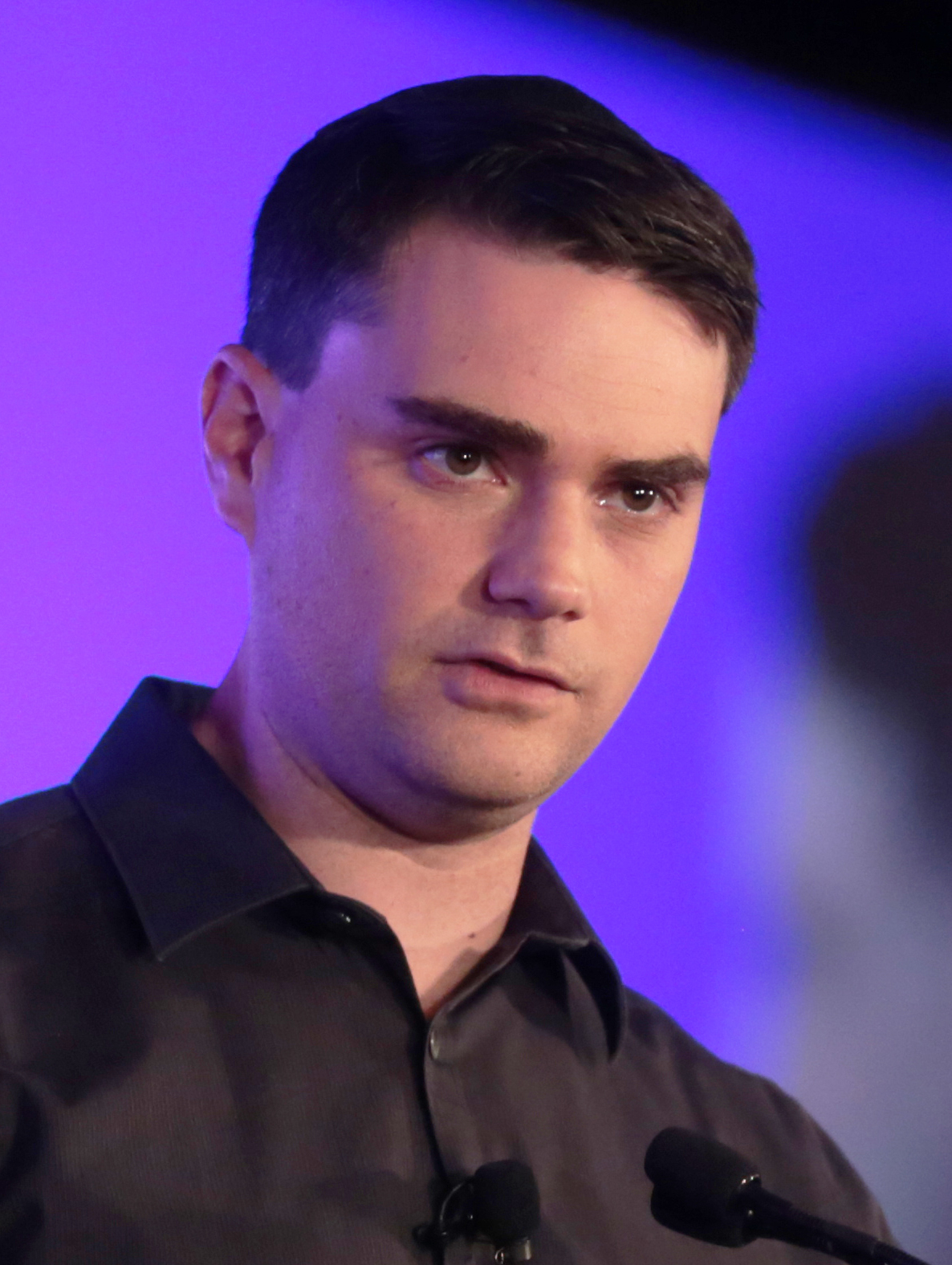
Ben Shapiro

- Scott Adams, cartoonist and creator of the comic strip Dilbert (previously unendorsed Trump)
- Sohrab Ahmari, Iranian-American columnist for the New York Post
- Saba Ahmed, Pakistani lawyer and activist
- Baked Alaska, alt-right influencer
- Ali Alexander, far-right activist and social media personality
- Jake Angeli, QAnon supporter later known for storming the United States Capitol
- Christopher R. Barron, cofounder of GOProud
- Cole Baritromo, blogger and former scammer
- Maria Bartiromo, television personality and author, former host of Closing Bell
- Kaitlin Bennett, conservative and gun rights activist
- Josh Bernstein, talk show host
- Gary Buechler, YouTube personality
- Lauren Boebert, businesswoman, gun-rights activist, and 2020 Republican nominee for the U.S. House for Colorado's 3rd district (eventual winner)
- Dan Bongino, conservative activist, radio host, and former Secret Service agent
- Deneen Borelli, conservative author, radio and television personality, columnist
- Peter Boykin, political commentator and founder of Gays for Trump
- L. Brent Bozell, founder and president of Media Research Center
- Michael Brown, radio host and author
- Tammy Bruce, radio host and political commentator
- Jon Caldara, libertarian activist and president of Independence Institute
- Kat Cammack, political advisor
- Tucker Carlson, political commentator and host of Tucker Carlson Tonight
- John Catanzara, Chicago police officer and president of the Chicago Fraternal Order of Police
- Madison Cawthorn, Republican nominee for North Carolina's 11th congressional district in the 2020 elections (He would later win said election.)
- Chen Guangcheng, Chinese civil rights activist
- Piers Corbyn, meteorologist and conspiracy theorist
- Jeff Crank, radio host
- Steven Crowder, American-Canadian conservative political commentator, YouTuber and comedian
- Dalas Review, Spanish YouTuber
- Joe Dallas, conversion therapy advocate
- Jim Daly, President of Focus on the Family
- Marjorie Dannenfelser, president of the Susan B. Anthony List
- Mark Davis, commentator and radio host
- Paris Dennard, conservative political speaker
- John Derbyshire, writer, computer programmer and journalist
- Casey DeSantis, First Lady of Florida, television show host, journalist and wife of Ron DeSantis
- Diamond and Silk, live-stream video bloggers, social media personalities and political activists
- Lou Dobbs, television commentator, opponent of immigration, and radio show host
- Dinesh D'Souza, conservative political author, filmmaker, and investigative journalist
- Larry Elder, conservative radio host and attorney
- Tarek Fatah, Pakistani-Canadian journalist and author
- Edwin Feulner, activist, founder and former president of The Heritage Foundation
- Yishai Fleisher, podcaster and columnist
- Kyle Forgeard, YouTuber and member of NELK
- Ryan Fournier, co-founder of Students for Trump
- Mike Francesca, sports talk radio host
- James Freeman, journalist, author and assistant editorial page editor at The Wall Street Journal
- Nick Fuentes, far-right political commentator, podcaster and white nationalist
- Brigitte Gabriel, author, anti-Islam activist and founder of ACT! for America
- Day Gardner, president of The National Black Pro Life Union
- Duncan Garner, New Zealand journalist and radio host
- Rick Gates, political consultant, lobbyist and convicted felon
- Pamela Geller, anti-Muslim and far-right political activist and commentator, blogger, birther, and conspiracy theorist
- Madison Gesiotto, conservative commentator, columnist, figure skater, model, beauty queen
- Joey Gibson, leader of Patriot Prayer
- Bernard Goldberg, journalist and political pundit
- Alan Gottlieb, conservative activist and gun rights advocate
- Jeremy Griggs, YouTube personality
- Thomas Glessner, lawyer and president of the National Institute of Family and Life Advocates
- Marjorie Taylor Greene, far-right political activist and Republican nominee for Georgia's 14th congressional district in 2020 (She would later win said election.)
- Kimberly Guilfoyle, prosecutor, television news personality, senior advisor for Donald Trump 2020 presidential campaign, partner of Donald Trump Jr., and First Lady of San Francisco (2004–2006)
- Greg Gutfeld, television producer, commentator, author, editor and comedian, host of The Greg Gutfeld Show (Libertarian)
- Marco Gutierrez, activist and founder of Latinos for Trump
- Sean Hannity, talk show host and conservative political commentator, host of Hannity and talk radio show The Sean Hannity Show
- Hugh Hewitt, radio show host and attorney
- Steve Hilton, political commentator and former British political advisor
- Josh Holstein, university student
- Katie Hopkins, British political commentator and columnist
- David Horowitz, conservative activist and author
- Hu Xijin, Chinese journalist and editor for the Global Times
- Deal W. Hudson, conservative political activist
- Charles Hurt, journalist, author and political commentator
- Carl Iannone, writer
- Stella Immanuel, American-Cameroonian physician and pastor
- Laura Ingraham, radio host and host of The Ingraham Angle
- Niger Innis, activist, politician
- Scott Jennings, conservative commentator
- Abby Johnson, anti-abortion activist, former clinic director at Planned Parenthood
- Alice Marie Johnson, criminal justice reform advocate and former federal prisoner (sentence commuted in June 2018 by Trump and then granted full pardon in August 2020)
- Benny Johnson, political columnist, chief creative officer at Turning Point USA, former editor at BuzzFeed
- Alex Jones, far-right radio show host, political extremist and conspiracy theorist
- Jason Jones, film producer, anti-abortion activist
- ~~Rabia Kazan, Turkish author and women's rights activist~~ (endorsement rescinded)
- Keemstar, YouTube personality
- Roger Kimball, conservative social commentator
- Ryan Kinel, YouTube personality
- Charlie Kirk, founder and leader of Turning Point USA
- Amy Kremer, Tea Party activist and co-founder for Women for Trump
- Bob Kroll, president of the Police Officers Federation of Minneapolis
- Chris LaCivita, political consultant
- Tomi Lahren, conservative political commentator and former television host
- Wayne LaPierre, executive vice president of the National Rifle Association of America
- Seth Leibsohn, conservative talk show host and author
- Leonard Leo, lawyer, conservative activist
- Corey Lewandowski, lobbyist and political commentator
- JT Lewis, gun rights activist
- David Limbaugh, political commentator and author
- Rush Limbaugh, political commentator and host of the radio show The Rush Limbaugh Show
- James Lindsay, mathematician and author
- Scott Lively, anti-gay activist and president of the Abiding Truth Ministries
- Laura Loomer, conspiracy theorist, far-right political activist and Republican nominee for Florida's 21st congressional district in 2020 (She would later lose said election.)
- Jeffrey Lord, political commentator and strategist
- Gina Loudon, conservative media personality
- Patrick Lynch, president of the Police Benevolent Association of the City of New York
- Matthew Lynn, British writer and financial columnist
- Myron Magnet, journalist and former editor of City Journal
- David Mamet, playwright and screenwriter
- Bethany Mandel, conservative author and commentator
- Taylor Marshall, Catholic apologist, writer, former academic, online content producer
- Jenny Beth Martin, co-founder of the Tea Party Patriots
- Mary Matalin, political consultant (Libertarian)
- Robert Stacy McCain, conservative journalist, writer and blogger
- Mark McCloskey, personal injury lawyer
- Scott McConnell, journalist, founding editor of The American Conservative
- Gavin McInnes, Canadian far-right political commentator and founder of Proud Boys
- Carolyn D. Meadows, conservative activist and president of the National Rifle Association of America
- Mary Ann Mendoza, angel mother and anti-semitic conspiracy theorist
- Michael the Black Man, conservative activist
- Jason Miller, communications strategist and political advisor
- Max Miller, deputy campaign manager for Donald Trump's 2020 Campaign
- Blake Moore, U.S. Foreign Service officer
- Stephen Moore, writer and co-founder of Club for Growth
- Steven W. Mosher, social scientist, anti-abortion activist, president of the Population Research Institute
- Deroy Murdock, political commentator
- Mario Murillo, author and journalist
- Douglas Murray, author, journalist and political commentator
- Paul Murray, Australian radio and TV presenter
- Troy Newman, anti-abortion activist and president of Operation Rescue
- Malik Obama, half-brother of Barack Obama
- Larry O'Connor, radio host
- John O'Sullivan, British conservative commentator and president of Danube Institute
- Alexander Otaola, YouTube personality, activist for democratic change and human rights in Cuba
- Candace Owens, conservative commentator and political activist
- Rita Panahi, Australian conservative columnist for The Herald and Weekly Times
- George Papadopoulos, convicted felon and former member of the foreign policy advisory panel to Donald Trump's 2016 presidential campaign
- Sudhir M. Parikh, Indian-American doctor
- Brad Parscale, political advisor and digital consultant
- Janet Parshall, radio host
- CJ Pearson, political activist
- Liz Peek, conservative commentator and business analyst
- Charlotte Pence Bond, writer and daughter of Mike Pence
- Karen Pence, schoolteacher, painter, Second Lady of the United States (2017–2021), and wife of Mike Pence
- Austin Petersen, radio host, political commentator and 2016 Libertarian candidate for president
- Katrina Pierson, Tea Party activist and communications consultant, national spokesperson for the Donald Trump 2016 presidential campaign
- Norman Podhoretz, pundit and writer for Commentary
- Andrew Pollack, author, school safety activist, entrepreneur, father of Meadow Pollack
- Jon Ponder, thrice-convicted bank robber, founder of the Hope for Prisoners program
- Tim Pool, YouTube personality and political commentator
- Janet Porter, anti-abortion activist
- Jack Posobiec, alt-right political activist and conspiracy theorist
- Juan D. Reyes, Republican politician, attorney
- Johnathan Lee Riches, professional agitator
- Chanel Rion, broadcaster, political cartoonist and children's book author, Chief White House correspondent for OAN
- Kyle Rittenhouse, later acquitted-suspect in the Kenosha unrest shooting and gun rights activist
- Geraldo Rivera, journalist, attorney, author, political commentator, and former host of Geraldo (also endorses Kanye West)
- Lew Rockwell, chairman of the Mises Institute
- Rick Roberts, radio host
- Wayne Allyn Root, conservative activist, radio host and the Libertarian Party's vice presidential nominee for the 2008 presidential elections
- Joel C. Rosenberg, American-Israeli author
- Dave Rubin, political commentator and host of The Rubin Report
- Austin Ruse, conservative activist and president of the Center for Family and Human Rights
- Joey Salads, YouTube personality, and prankster
- Maria Elvira Salazar, television personality and new anchor, and 2020 Republican nominee for the U.S. House for Florida's 27th district (She would later win said election.)
- Michael Savage, author, conservative commentator and radio host
- Andrew Schlafly, lawyer and founder of Conservapedia
- Manny Sethi, physician and orthopedic trauma surgeon
- Buck Sexton, radio host and television talk show host, author, and conservative commentator
- Ben Shapiro, editor-at-large of The Daily Wire
- Greg Sheridan, journalist and editor for The Australian
- Sampat Shivangi, physician
- Dimitri Simes, president of Center for the National Interest and publisher of The National Interest
- Roger L. Simon, novelist, screenwriter and analyst at The Epoch Times
- Vanila Singh, physician, professor
- Helen Smith, forensic psychologist
- Lee Smith, journalist and Senior Fellow at Hudson Institute
- Bo Snerdley, call screener, producer and engineer for The Rush Limbaugh Show
- Angela Stanton-King, public speaker and Republican candidate for Georgia's 5th congressional district in the 2020 elections (She would later lose said election.)
- Todd Starnes, conservative columnist, commentator and radio host
- Harry Stein, author, columnist and editor at City Journal
- Roger Stone, conservative political consultant, lobbyist, and convicted felon (Granted pardon by Trump in July 2020)
- Marsha Petrie Sue, author, public speaker, motivational coach
- Cheryl Sullenger, anti-abortion activist and vice president of Operation Rescue
- Carol M. Swain, conservative television analyst
- Tang Baiqao, Chinese dissident and democracy activist, student leader of the Tiananmen Square protests
- Taki Theodoracopulos, Greek writer and publisher who founded Taki's Magazine and co-founded The American Conservative
- Enrique Tarrio, businessman, chairman of the far-right organization Proud Boys and Florida state director of the grassroots organization Latinos for Trump
- Leo Terrell, civil rights attorney and talk radio host (Democrat)
- Randall Terry, anti-abortion activist and founder of Operation Rescue
- Philip Terzian, journalist and writer at The Washington Examiner
- Cal Thomas, columnist, author and pundit
- Clay Travis, writer, lawyer, radio host, and television analyst
- Lara Trump, former television producer, senior advisor for the Donald Trump 2020 presidential campaign and daughter-in-law of Donald Trump
- Melania Trump, former model, businesswoman, First Lady of the United States (2017–2021), and wife of Donald Trump
- R. Emmett Tyrell, author, columnist and editor-in-chief of The American Spectator
- Bob Vander Plaats, president of The Family Leader
- Gary Varvel, editorial cartoonist for The Indianapolis Star
- Michael Voris, Catholic author and apologist
- Tonette Walker, First Lady of Wisconsin and wife of Scott Walker
- Wang Dan, Chinese dissident and democracy activist, student leader of the Tiananmen Square protests
- Wang Juntao, Chinese dissident and democracy activist, student leader of the Tiananmen Square protests
- Jesse Watters, conservative political commentator, co-host of The Five
- Diana West, author and columnist
- Liz Wheeler, conservative political commentator
- Bill White, former president of the Intrepid Sea, Air & Space Museum
- Armstrong Williams, author and commentator
- Lauren Witzke, far-right activist and conspiracy theorist
- Jacob Wohl, far-right conspiracy theorist, fraudster, and internet troll
- Milo Yiannopoulos, far-right political commentator, polemicist, public speaker and writer
- Erica Yuen, Hong Kong politician, political activist, businesswoman, actress, presenter and former beauty queen
- Marc Zell, Israeli-American lawyer and vice president of Republican Overseas

== Religious leaders ==
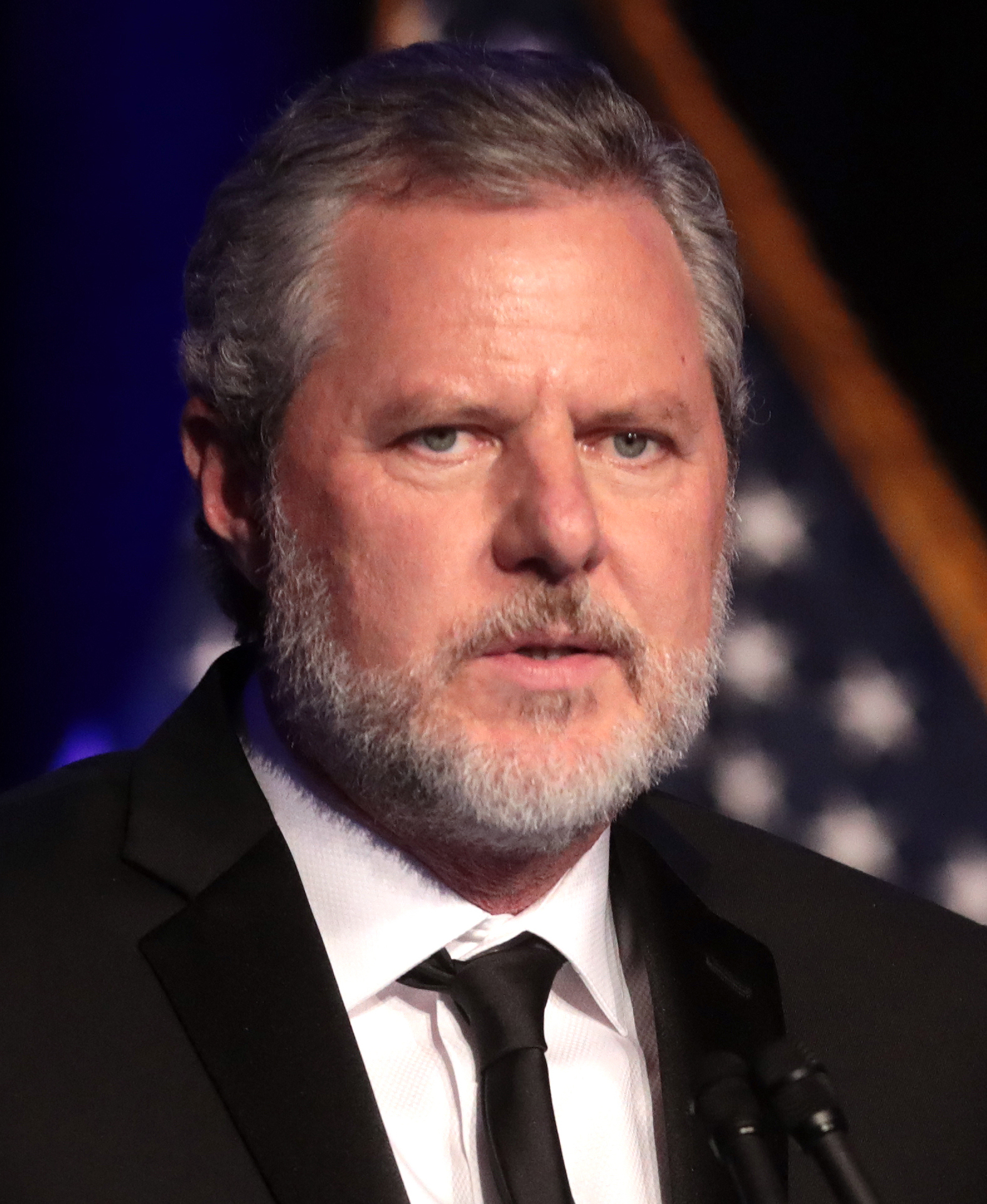
Jerry Falwell Jr.

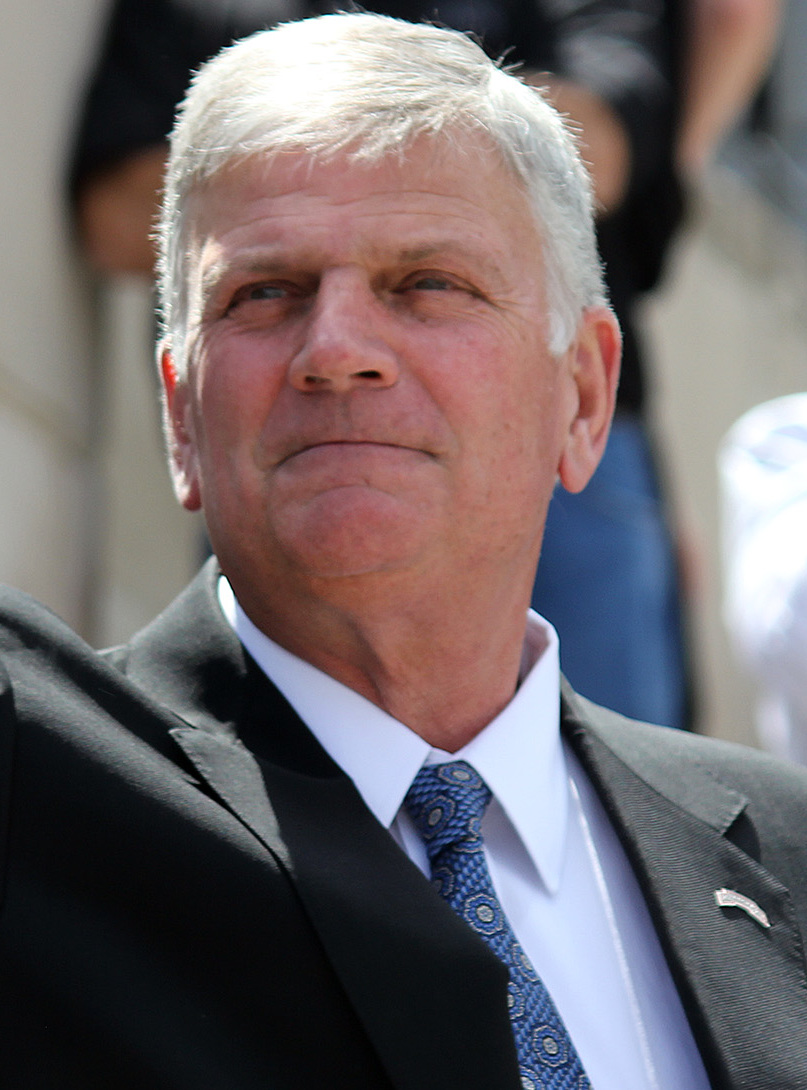
Franklin Graham

- Ché Ahn, pastor
- Jim Bakker, televangelist and convicted fraudster
- Irvin Baxter Jr, Oneness Pentecostal minister and founder and president of Endtime Ministries
- Mark Burns, televangelist and pastor
- C. L. Bryant, Baptist minister
- Kenneth Copeland, televangelist
- Paul Crouch Jr, Christian broadcaster
- James Dobson, Christian author and founder of Focus on the Family
- Shmuel Eliyahu, chief rabbi of Tzfat
- Jerry Falwell Jr., president of Liberty University (2007–2020) and prominent member of the Evangelical Christian community
- Jentezen Franklin, pastor and televangelist
- Jim Garlow, former pastor of Skyline Church
- Paul Goulet, pastor
- Franklin Graham, evangelical leader and son of Billy Graham
- Wayne Grudem, theologian at the Phoenix Seminary
- John Hagee, pastor, televangelist and founder and chair of Christians United for Israel
- Skip Heitzig, pastor
- E.W. Jackson, pastor
- Harry Jackson Jr, pastor and Pentecostal bishop
- Yosef Yitzchak Jacobson, Chabad rabbi
- Robert Jeffress, Southern Baptist pastor of the First Baptist Church
- David Jeremiah, pastor
- Bill Johnson, senior leader at Bethel Church
- Shmuel Kamenetsky, Haredi rabbi, co-founder and Rosh Yeshiva of Talmudical Yeshiva of Philadelphia
- Dov Lior, chief rabbi of Kiryat Arba
- John MacArthur, pastor of Grace Community Church
- Guillermo Maldonado, pastor of the King Jesus Ministry
- Albert Mohler, theologian and president of the Southern Baptist Theological Seminary
- Hyung Jin Moon, pastor
- Johnnie Moore Jr, evangelical leader
- Chris Oyakhilome, Nigerian pastor and televangelist
- Frank Pavone, Catholic priest and anti-abortion activist
- Steven Pruzansky, Orthodox rabbi
- Yisroel Reisman, rosh yeshiva at Yeshiva Torah Vodaas
- Moshe Reuven Azman, chief rabbi of Brodsky Synagogue in Kyiv
- Shlomo Riskin, Orthodox rabbi and founder of the Lincoln Square Synagogue
- James Robison, televangelist
- Samuel Rodriguez, pastor
- Sid Roth, televangelist
- Darrell C. Scott, pastor
- Don Stewart, Pentecostal minister and televangelist
- Carlo Maria Viganò, archbishop and former Apostolic Nuncio to the United States
- Paula White, pastor, author, televangelist
- Andrew Wommack, pastor and televangelist
- George Wood, Pentecostal minister

== Astronauts ==
- Buzz Aldrin, second man on the Moon in 1969 after Neil Armstrong during the Apollo 11 mission

== Organizations ==
=== Activist groups ===
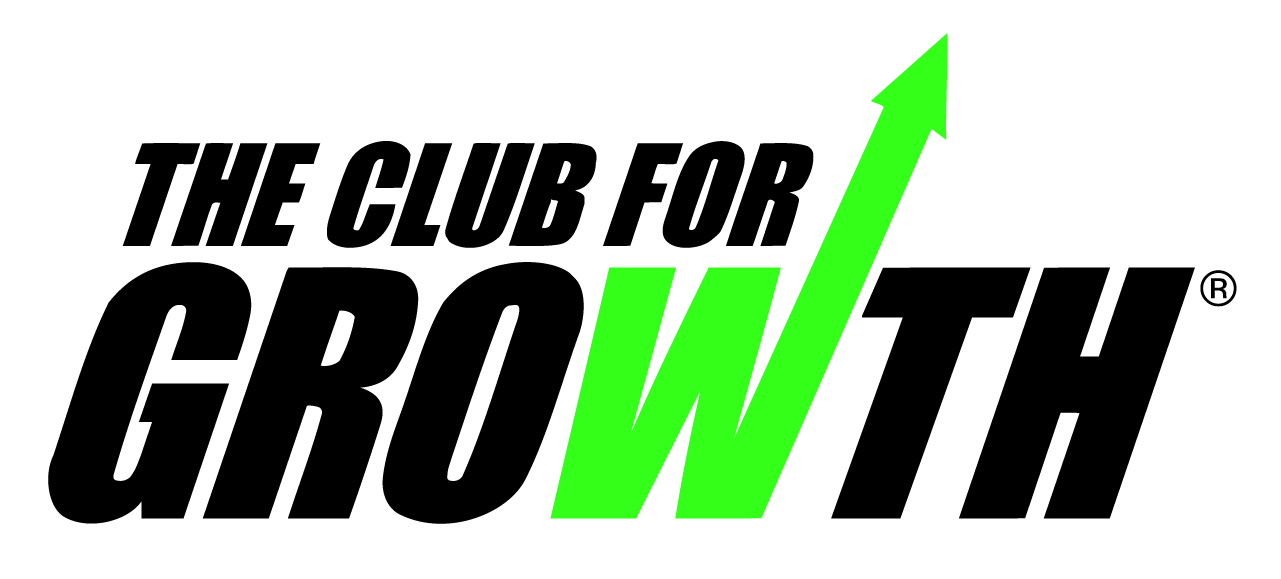
Club for Growth

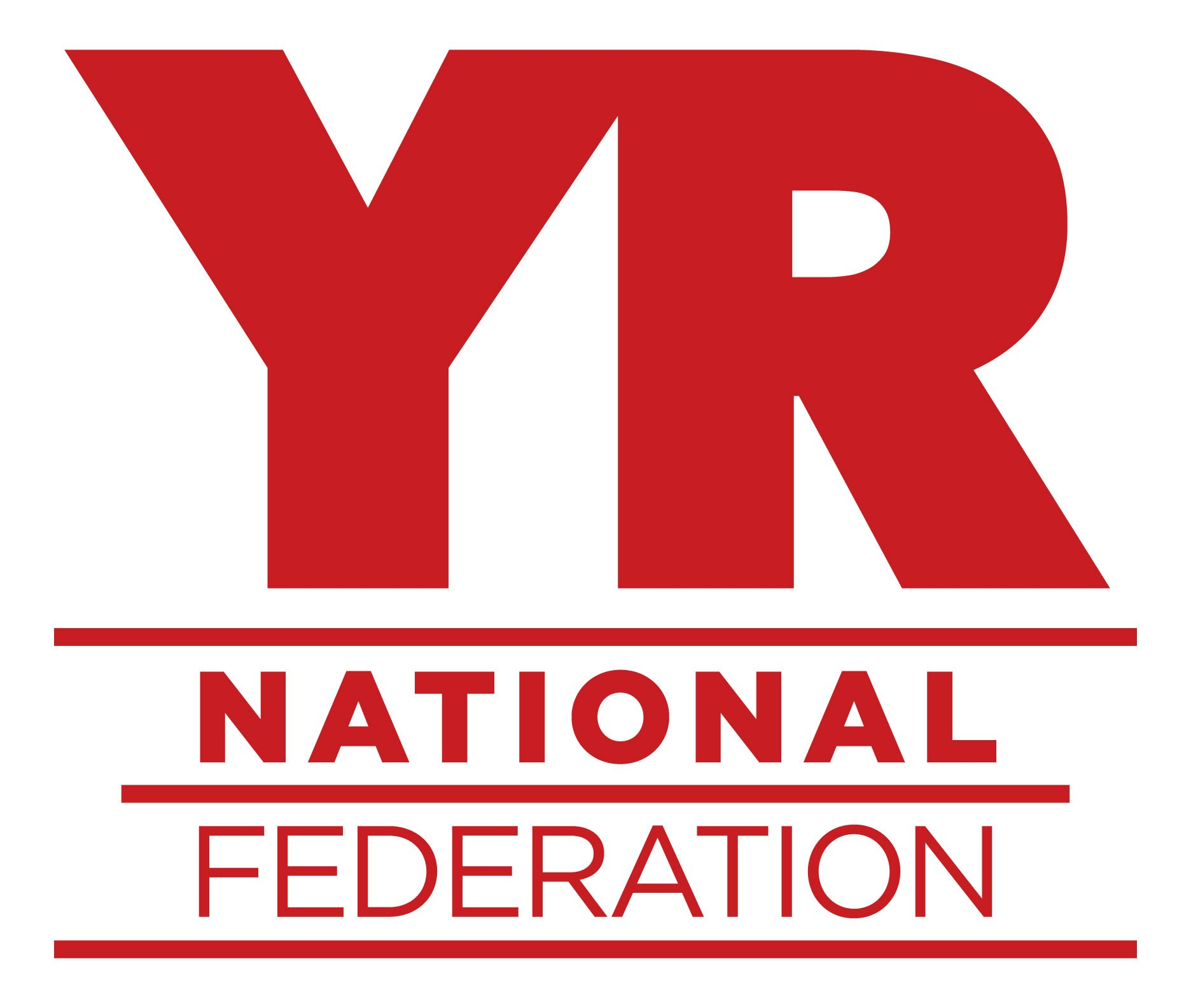
Young Republicans

- 60 Plus Association
- ACT! for America
- American Energy Alliance
- Americans for Limited Government
- Associated Builders and Contractors
- Billy Graham Evangelistic Association
- Brigade 2506 Veteran's Association
- CatholicVote.org
- Center for Arizona Policy
- Christian Civic League of Maine
- Citizens United
- Club for Growth
- College Republican National Committee
- Committee to Defend the President
- The Conservative Caucus
- Deplorable Pride
- Eagle Forum
- Empower Texans
- Faith and Freedom Coalition
- Family Policy Alliance
- Family Policy Alliance of Kansas
- Focus on the Family
- FreedomWorks
- Gays for Trump
- Groypers
- Hindu Sena
- Illinois Family Association
- Latinos for Trump
- Log Cabin Republicans
- Michigan Farm Bureau
- Minnesota Citizens Concerned for Life
- National Diversity Coalition for Trump
- National Federation of Republican Assemblies
- National Federation of Republican Women
- National Republican Congressional Committee
- National Right to Life Committee
- New York State Rifle and Pistol Association
- New York Young Republican Club
- Oath Keepers
- Ohio Right to Life
- Operation Rescue
- Pasadena Republican Club
- Patriot Prayer
- Pennsylvania Young Republicans
- Priests for Life
- Promise Keepers
- Proud Boys (endorsement rejected by Trump)
- Republican Hindu Coalition
- Republican Jewish Coalition
- Republican National Hispanic Assembly
- Republican National Lawyers Association
- Republicans Overseas
- Republican State Leadership Committee
- Students for Trump
- Tea Party Express
- Tea Party Patriots
- Texas Alliance for Life
- Three Percenters
- Virginia Women for Trump
- Wisconsin Family Council
- Wisconsin Manufacturers & Commerce
- Women for Trump
- Young Republicans

=== Political action committees ===
- America First Action
- American Crossroads
- Campaign for Working Families
- Club for Growth Action
- Great America Committee
- Great America PAC
- Huck PAC
- NRA Political Victory Fund
- Tea Party Patriots Citizens Fund
- Texas Patriots PAC
- Trump Victory
- Turning Point Action

=== Unions ===
- Amtrak Fraternal Order of Police, representing 452
- Chicago Fraternal Order of Police, representing 14,086
- Dallas Police Association, representing 4,000
- Detectives' Endowment Association, representing 17,200
- Florida Police Benevolent Association, representing 30,000
- Fraternal Order of Police, representing 355,000
- International Union of Police Associations, representing 19,200
- Las Vegas Metro Police Managers and Supervisors Association
- Louisiana State Troopers Association
- Massachusetts Police Association, representing 18,000
- Milwaukee Police Association, representing 1,868
- Nassau County Police Benevolent Union, representing 2,400
- National Association of Police Organizations, representing 362,000
- National Border Patrol Council, representing 18,000
- National Immigration and Customs Enforcement Council, representing 7,600
- North Las Vegas Police Officers Association, representing 398
- Pennsylvania State Troopers Association, representing 9,200
- Philadelphia Firefighters and Paramedics Union, representing 4,500 (upheld endorsement after vote in October 2020)
- Police Benevolent Association of the City of New York, representing 24,000
- Police Officers Association of Michigan, representing 12,000
- Public Safety Alliance of Nevada, representing 10,000
- Reno Police Protective Association, representing 330
- Retired Police Association of New York, representing 5,000
- Sergeants Benevolent Association, representing 11,000
- St. Louis Police Officers' Association, representing 1802
- Suffolk County Police Benevolent Association, representing 2,349
- Tucson Police Officer's Association, representing 807

=== Radio stations ===
- WVIP
- WVOX

=== Websites ===
- Church Militant
- Jexodus
- Occidental Observer
- Power Line
- TheDonald.win
- The Save Jersey Blog
- Vos Iz Neias?

=== Native American tribes ===
- Crow Tribe of Montana

== See also ==
- List of Republicans who opposed the Donald Trump 2020 presidential campaign
- Endorsements in the 2020 Republican Party presidential primaries
- List of Donald Trump 2016 presidential campaign endorsements
- List of former Trump administration officials who endorsed Joe Biden
- List of Joe Biden 2020 presidential campaign endorsements
- List of Jo Jorgensen 2020 presidential campaign endorsements
- List of Howie Hawkins 2020 presidential campaign endorsements
- News media endorsements in the 2020 United States presidential primaries
