= Ryan Woods =

Ryan Woods may refer to:

- Ryan Woods (footballer, born 1988), English footballer for Carshalton Athletic
- Ryan Woods (footballer, born 1993), English footballer for Oldham Athletic
- Lady MAGA, drag persona created by Ryan Woods
