= List of Donald Trump 2020 presidential campaign endorsements =

For a List of Donald Trump 2020 presidential campaign endorsements, see:

- List of Donald Trump 2020 presidential campaign political endorsements
- List of Donald Trump 2020 presidential campaign non-political endorsements
