= Robert Dello Russo =

American businessman (died 2021)

- Died: June 4, 2021

Robert G. Dello Russo was an American businessman and golf course owner in Florida.

== Career ==
=== Businesses ===
Dello Russo owned Del-Air Heating & Air Conditioning, founded in 1983, based in Lake Mary, Florida, outside Orlando. He also owned Del-Air Appliance.

Dello Russo, with business partner Chad Barton, founded the American Group, which contains American Door & Millwork (founded in 1995), American Window (2002), and American Installation. The companies are based in Sanford, Florida, with additional facilities in Tampa, Florida, and Jacksonville, Florida.

The American Group defaulted on a $21 million loan originated by Fifth Third Bank. The loan was sold to Bank of America, who sued Dello Russo for his personal guarantee of the loan, which had been verbally discharged by Fifth Third. Bank of America won in 2015. Dello Russo appealed in the Eleventh Circuit, arguing that Fifth Third misrepresented the loan to Bank of America. He also lost on appeal.

=== Golf courses ===
Beginning in 2002, Dello Russo, Chad Barton, and other partners operating as University Golf Club Inc. began buying distressed golf courses, starting with the Country Club of Deer Run of Casselberry, Florida, for $1.5 million. They bought Casselberry Golf Club in 2002, Country Club of Mount Dora in 2003, Wekiva Golf Club of Longwood, Florida, in 2004 and Rock Springs Ridge Golf Club of Apopka, Florida, in 2005 for $3 million. In 2006, they bought Twin Rivers Golf Club of Oviedo, Florida, after its previous owner, Meadowbrook Golf Inc., foreclosed on it to Banc of America Securities LLC in 2005.

Rock Springs Ridge was closed in 2014.

In 2015, the city of Casselberry purchased Casselberry from Dello Russo for $2.2 million.

In 2016, the city of Oviedo purchased Twin Rivers for $5 million.

Country Club of Deer Run closed in 2019 after losing money; Dello Russo said he would sell it for $6 million.

== Political involvement ==
Dello Russo was scheduled to host a Donald Trump presidential campaign fundraiser at his Longwood mansion on September 19, 2016, but it was cancelled after the St. Cloud mall stabbing and 2016 New York and New Jersey bombings.

Russo made large donations to Ron DeSantis.

Russo was a member of the nine-person Donald Trump Jr. Executive Steering Committee, along with Lev Parnas.

Donald Trump attended an invitation-only lunch fundraiser at Dello Russo's mansion on March 9, 2020. The cost was $11,200 per couple up to $100,000 per couple. The luncheon headlined Trump, Ronna McDaniel, Thomas O. Hicks, Jr., Todd Ricketts, Kimberly Guilfoyle, and Brad Parscale. It was hosted by Diane & Bob Dello Russo, Lee Chira (onetime head of the Florida High Speed Rail Authority), Mary Demetree (Demetree Real Estate Services), Bill Heavener (CEO of Full Sail University), Allan Keen (who resigned from leading the Orlando-Orange County Expressway over corruption scandals), Mark Modarres, and Lori Sommers. The luncheon raised $4 million.

== Personal life and death ==
Dello Russo was married to Diane Dello Russo and lived in Longwood, Florida. He died on June 4, 2021.
