= Gay cake case =

The Gay cake case may refer to:

- Lee v Ashers Baking Company Ltd and others (2018), in the Supreme Court of the United Kingdom
- Masterpiece Cakeshop v. Colorado Civil Rights Commission (2018), in the Supreme Court of the United States
