= Vanila Singh =

Former HHS official

Vanila M. Singh
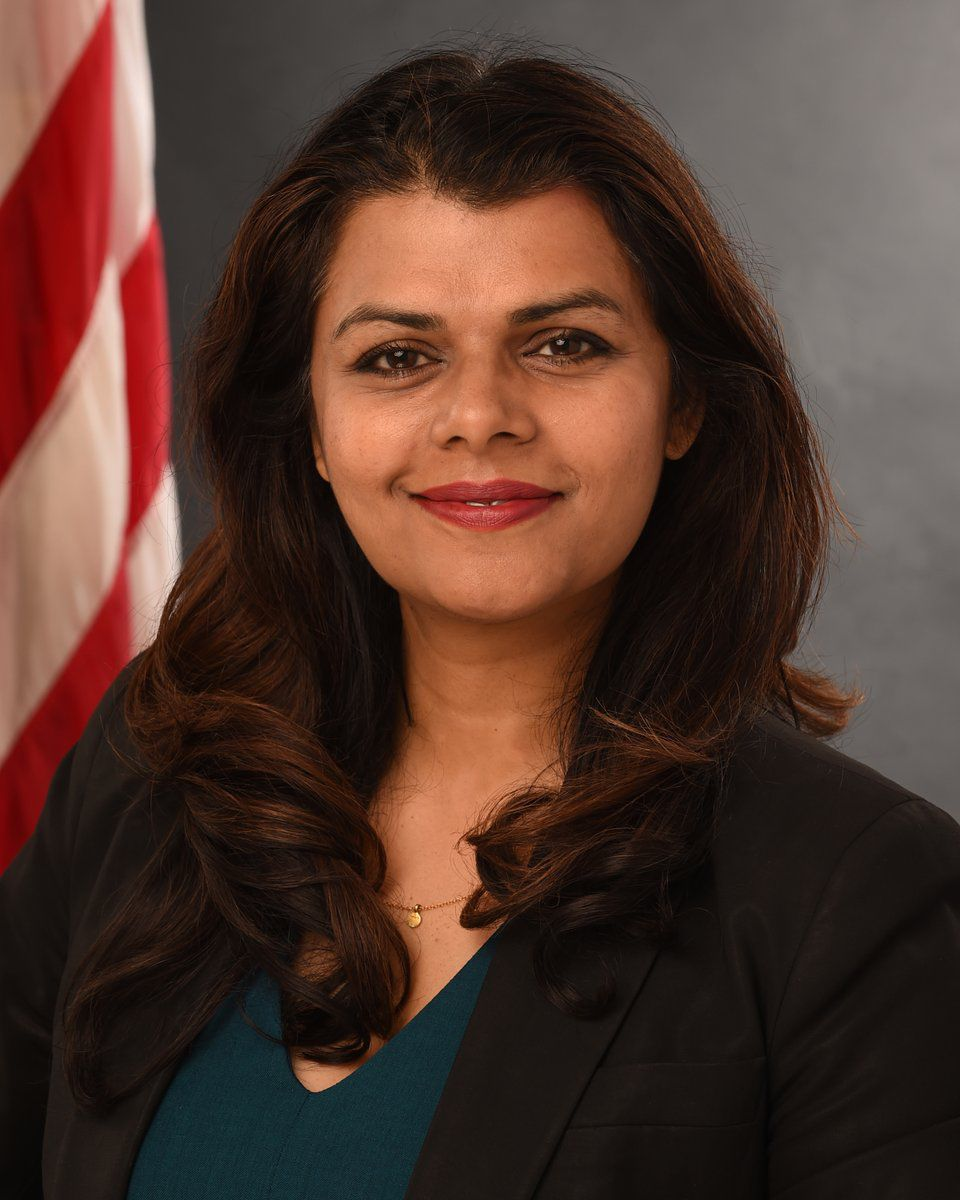

Personal details
- Born: Rajasthan, India
- Party: Republican
- Education: University of California, Berkeley (BS); George Washington University Medical Center (MD)

Vanila M. Singh is an Indian-born American physician and professor. She is currently an associate professor of anesthesiology, perioperative and pain medicine at Stanford University Medical Center. In early 2014, Singh announced a campaign to obtain the Republican Party endorsement in a bid against incumbent Mike Honda to represent California's 17th congressional district in the US House of Representatives. She stated she was enlisted in the race following the efforts of Shalabh Kumar, an Indian businessman based out of Chicago, who wished to assemble a pro-India Republican team in Congress. However, her campaign terminated after she came third in the primaries.

She previously advocated for the United States to issue a visa to Narendra Modi, a controversial Hindu nationalist politician embroiled in accusations of orchestrating state-sponsored violence against minorities in India, but backtracked following outrage.

In June 2017, she was appointed the chief medical officer to the Office of the Assistant Secretary for Health at the U.S. Department of Health and Human Services.

== Early life and education ==
Vanila M. Singh was born in Bikaner, India. At age one her parents Lalit and Leela Mathur immigrated to the United States. The family moved to California when she was four years old, and she spent her youth in Fremont, California, attending Niles Elementary School, Centerville Junior High School, and Washington High School. During her childhood her parents helped establish a Hindu temple in Fremont, also founding the Rajasthani Association of North America.

Singh was accepted to the University of California, Berkeley where she double-majored in economics and molecular and cell biology. Graduating with a B.S., she then moved to Washington, D.C. to become a medical student at the George Washington University Medical Center, where she received her M.D. Specializing in ultrasound-guided interventional procedures for pain and regional anesthesiology, Singh earned a Masters of Academic Medicine from University of Southern California.

== Career ==
=== Medical roles ===
Singh completed her initial medical internship at Yale University Medical Center in 1997 and 1998. An anesthesia resident at Cornell Medical Center in Manhattan from 1998 until 2001, from 2001 until 2002 she was a pain management fellow in various locations, including Cornell University, Columbia Medical Center, Memorial Sloan Kettering Cancer Center, and the Hospital for Special Surgery. She is double-certified in anesthesia and pain management from the American Board of Anesthesiology. After serving as a clinical assistant professor at the University of California, Los Angeles (UCLA) Medical Center, she became a clinical associate professor at Stanford University Medical School for anesthesiology, perioperative and pain medicine. Singh is named as a teaching mentor for the pain fellowship at Walter Reed National Military Medical Center.

=== U.S. Department of Health and Human Services ===
Singh was named Chief Medical Officer for the Office of the Assistant Secretary for Health at the U.S. Department of Health and Human Services (HHS) on June 12, 2017, as the primary medical advisor to the Assistant Secretary for Health on the development and implementation of HHS-wide public health policy recommendations, and guiding the national policy on opioids.

She was also appointed as the Acting Regional Health Administrator for Region 9 (California, Arizona, Nevada, Hawaii and six Pacific Islands) in August 2018.

=== Board memberships ===
Singh is an independent member of the board of Lucid Lane, a telehealth service for preventing anxiety, pain, and dependence on substances and medication. She was appointed as an independent board of directors member for BioDelivery Sciences, International, a specialty pharmaceutical company focused on the treatment of serious and debilitating chronic conditions. She is also an independent board member for Virpax Pharmaceuticals Inc., a company developing novel drug delivery systems for pain management.

=== 2014 election ===
From October 2005 to December 2013, Singh did not register any political affiliations, whereafter she promptly registered as Republican. The following day, she lodged her intention to run for the House of Representatives.

In January 2014 she challenged incumbent Mike Honda, a Democrat, to represent California's 17th congressional district (Silicon Valley) in the 2014 midterm elections. She was the first Republican-endorsed candidate to enter the race leading up to the June 3, 2014 open primaries held to select the two main candidates for the official elections in November. Although new to politics, Singh had previously supported politicians such as Democratic Representative Tulsi Gabbard of Hawaii. An early poll in March 2014 indicated Singh ahead of Democratic challenger Ro Khanna and behind Honda. As campaign points she focused on topics such as healthcare reform. She criticized the Affordable Care Act as lacking of physician involvement in the drafting of the legislation, arguing it needed to be overhauled or shut down. She received the endorsement of the Santa Clara and Alameda Republican Party, as well as House Republicans including congressmen Pete Sessions and Eric Cantor.

During her campaign, she rejected invitations for debates and largely maintained a low profile, puzzling spectators with her conduct; Singh said she was enlisted into the race following the efforts of a Chicago-based Indian businessman, Shalabh Kumar, who wished to assemble a pro-India Republican team in the Congress. Singh had previously suggested that the United States reconsider its decision to deny a visa to Narendra Modi, a Hindu nationalist politician in India embroiled in accusations of state-sponsored violence against Muslims, but quickly withdrew following backlash.

Voters began casting ballots by mail on May 3 and on June 4 Honda and Ro Khanna were the top finishers in the election, followed by Singh with 16 percent of the vote.

California's 17th congressional district election, 2014
Primary election
Party	Candidate	Votes	%
Democratic	Mike Honda (incumbent)	43,607	48.2
Democratic	Ro Khanna	25,384	28.0
Republican	Vanila Singh	15,359	17.0
Republican	Joel VanLandingham	6,154	6.8
Total votes		90,504	100.0

=== Later political roles ===
In August 2014, Republican gubernatorial candidate Neel Kashkari named Singh the chair of his "Indo American Coalition team" while campaigning against incumbent Jerry Brown. In July 2016, the press reported that Singh was serving as a California delegate at the Republican National Convention. In September, the Economic Times also reported that she was "actively working with national lawmakers on health policy issues."

== Personal life ==
A resident of the Bay Area of California, Singh is married with two children.

== Awards and achievements ==
On October 16, 2021, Singh was awarded the Standiford Helm Award honoring individuals advancing the specialty of Interventional Pain Management. On February 28, 2020, she was awarded the Philipp M. Lippe award from the American Academy of Pain Medicine for outstanding contributions to the social and political aspects of pain medicine. In 2018, Singh was awarded the Lifetime Achievement Award by the American Society of Interventional Pain Physicians.

== See also ==
- United States House of Representatives elections in California, 2014
