= Xia Yeliang =

Chinese economist (born 1960)

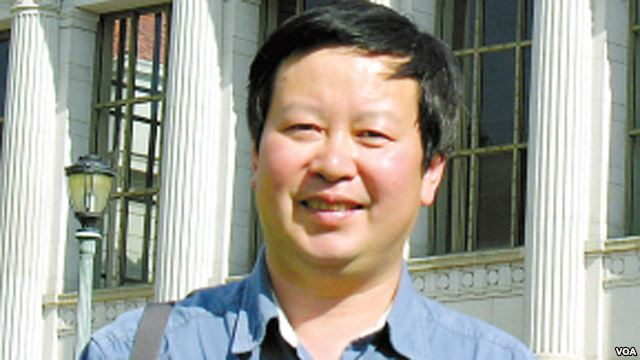
Xia Yeliang

Xia Yeliang (Chinese: 夏业良; born 4 September 1960) is a former associate professor of economics at Peking University. He was one of the early drafters and signers of Charter 08 in 2008. In June 2013, he was given notice by a Chinese Communist Party (CCP) official at the School of Economics that a faculty vote regarding termination of his position at the university was scheduled. He was dismissed in October 2013. PKU issued an announcement afterwards, claiming "In recent years, Xia's teaching evaluations has been consistently the lowest of the whole School of Economics, which has received more than 340 student complaints since 2006. The hiring and promotion committee voted against the renewal of his contract on Oct 26, 2012. As a courtesy, the school gave Xia one year extension for possible improvement. On Oct 11, 2013, the committee voted again. 34 out of 37 members showed up. 3 voted yes, 1 abstained, and 30 voted no. The school therefore terminated the contract."

Although media said that the complaints contained allegations that Xia gave "anti-Party and anti-socialism" speeches in class, the School of Economics has not made public the teaching evaluations or any other verifiable information regarding the evaluation process. In media interviews, Xia has claimed he has not been allowed to see the student evaluation instruments and that it is impossible therefore to determine if there is any factual basis for the claims made against him by the School of Economics. Xia called on supporters to contact universities across the country and suggest that he be given an administrative position in a library, something that Xia argued should not present a difficulty if his termination was solely based on student dissatisfaction and not politically motivated.

Xia, a supporter of democracy and human rights, has been outspoken in the past going so far as to directly criticize Liu Yunshan, at the time the director of the CCP Central Propaganda Department with respect to censorship and asking him, "how he thinks he has the power to control other people's thoughts". Liu later became a member of the Politburo Standing Committee of the CCP, the top leadership of the People's Republic of China, from 2012 to 2017.

Xia was a visiting scholar at Stanford during the summer of 2013 and visited Wellesley College during August. Wellesley faculty have strongly rallied to his support. According to Xia, he has been pressured for years by university officials to keep quiet about his views and has been followed routinely by security personnel. Nevertheless, in 2013, Xia expressed surprise regarding the upcoming faculty vote. Xia and a few others are believed to be targets of a campaign underway since May 2013 to suppress 7 categories of information.

In 2019, Xia has voiced support for then U.S. President Donald Trump, citing his tough stances against the CCP.
