= The Save Jersey Blog =

Conservative political blog

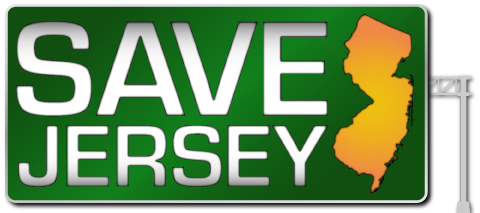
- Website type: Political News Site
- Founder: Matt Rooney
- Editor: Matt Rooney
- Website: savejersey.com
- Launched: May 21, 2008

The Save Jersey Blog is a conservative political blog focusing on New Jersey and national politics. It was founded by New Jersey political activist, attorney, and radio host Matt Rooney in May 2008.

During its first full year of operation, Save Jersey covered and commented on the heated 2009 New Jersey Republican gubernatorial primary contest between rival candidates Chris Christie and Steve Lonegan. Save Jersey, and Matt Rooney specifically, emerged as early, vocal supporters of Christie's candidacy. In April 2009, Chris Cillizza of the Washington Post's "The Fix" named Save Jersey one of the nation's top state political blogs. Save Jersey's site traffic went on to exceed its other state-based competitors throughout the Summer of 2009.

In the general election, Save Jersey was a relentless critic of former Governor Jon Corzine, lampooning him for his connections to "Operation Bid Rig," the state's notoriously high property taxes, and his relationship with public sector unions, including his romantic involvement with Carla Katz, the then-president of Local 1034 of the Communications Workers of America.

== Save Jersey Breaks Chris Daggett, NJDSC Robocall Campaign Scandal ==
In October 2009, as the gubernatorial race gained national attention and Chris Daggett emerged as a potential third-party spoiler to Chris Christie's eventual victory, Save Jersey was the first to report that the New Jersey Democratic State Committee ("NJDSC") was funding robocalls supporting Daggett's candidacy in Somerset County.

== Criticism of Chris Christie ==
In the second term of former Governor Chris Christie, Save Jersey emerged as a critic to the Governor's political right, finding fault with everything from his use of New Jersey Republican State Committee funds for legal fees related to the Bridgegate controversy and out-of-state travel to his public support of the Dallas Cowboys over the Philadelphia Eagles. A Facebook exchange between Rooney and the Governor's brother, Todd, in which he disparaged Senator Ted Cruz during the 2016 Republican Presidential Primary drew headlines as Christie campaigned for president.

== Brett Kavanaugh Confirmation Hearing ==
During the high-profile Supreme Court confirmation hearings for Justice Brett Kavanaugh in October 2018, Save Jersey was the first to connect a 1992 column that Senator Cory Booker - an emotional and theatrical Kavanaugh critic - had written for the Stanford Daily as a student at Stanford University, in which he described "groping" a girl and "stealing second" as they kissed at a 1984 New Year's Eve party.

== Noemi Velazquez Controversy ==
In October 2018, Save Jersey's reporting led to the 10-day, unpaid suspension of an aide to Governor Phil Murphy after the blog posted screenshots of Velazquez calling Republican leaders "evangelical ***holes" who are "molesters, liars, drunks, racists, heartless, bigots."

== 2021 New Jersey Gubernatorial Election ==
During the 2021 New Jersey Gubernatorial Election, Save Jersey once again resumed its coverage an analysis in the Republican primary and of the eventual contest in the general election between incumbent Governor Phil Murphy and Republican businessman Jack Ciattarelli. During the primary, Save Jersey was the first to report that Republican candidate and Evangelical Pastor Phil Rizzo had made offensive comments about the Catholic Church. In July 2021, when Seaside Heights' Republican Mayor Anthony Vaz announced his support for Murphy, Rooney tweeted saying he would support any Republican who "wants to step up and challenge" the mayor in the 2023 GOP primary. In October 2021, Save Jersey was the first to report on photos that showed Governor Phil Murphy in violation of his own mask policies during the COVID-19 pandemic, leading to the Governor being asked about the event during the second gubernatorial debate.
