= Marsha Petrie Sue =

American motivational speaker

Marsha Petrie Sue is an author, public speaker, and motivational coach from Scottsdale, Arizona, United States.

Sue has been a visiting professor at Arizona State University and has served as executive vice president at Westinghouse Financial Services, director of national accounts at USWest/Qwest, and as regional markets manager at GTE Directory Company. She serves on the NRA Women's Leadership Forum Executive Committee and has opposed gun control.

In 2022 Sue was appointed to the Arizona Game and Fish Commission.

Sue has written multiple books, including:

- The Reactor Factor: How to Handle Difficult Work Situations Without Going Nuclear
- Toxic People
- The CEO of You
- The Accountability Master
- Presentation Success Secrets
- Are You Listening?
- It's About Time!
- Customer Service
- Winning Together
- Is Your Life Working?
- Team Building the Easy Way
- Communicating with Empathy
