= Jon Ponder =

American thrice-convicted bank-robber

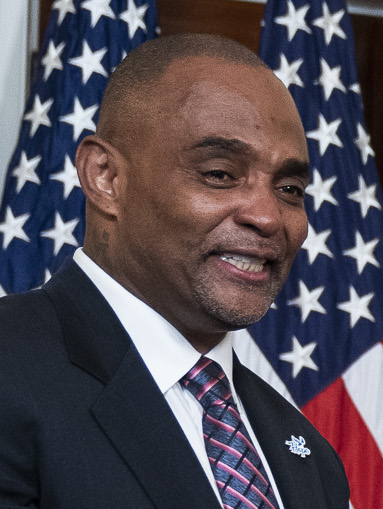
- Ponder in August 2020
- Criminal penalty: 5 years in prison
- Criminal status: Pardoned

December 2020 pardon granted by Donald Trump

Jon Donyae Ponder is an American thrice-convicted bank-robber who after his release in 2009 has founded the Hope for Prisoners program in Nevada which helps former prisoners to reintegrate into society.

Ponder's work was put into the national spotlight when President Donald Trump granted him a pardon during the 2020 Republican National Convention. The pardon was publicized shortly before Ponder was scheduled to appear as a speaker at the event.

In 2026, Ponder was arrested on charges of sexual abuse, the victims being female inmates involved in Ponder's Hope for Prisoners program.

== Life ==
Ponder grew up in New York City where he got involved with gangs as a teenager. He was first arrested for armed robbery at the age of 16. In 2004, he was arrested for bank robbery in Las Vegas and sent to federal prison in Pennsylvania.

== Hope for Prisoners ==
In 2009, he founded Hope for Prisoners to enable former convicts to reintegrate into society, working with law enforcement (including the FBI agent who arrested Ponder) and local businesses. According to researchers at University of Nevada, Las Vegas, between January and June 2015, 64% of participants of the program found stable employment while 6% of participants were arrested again.
