= Lady MAGA =

Drag queen

- Created by: Ryan Woods
- Portrayed by: Ryan Woods

In-universe information
- Occupation: Drag artist, political activist
- Origin: United States
- Nationality: American

Lady MAGA is a character created by Ryan Woods, an American political activist, internet personality and former drag queen who supported Donald Trump during the 2020 United States presidential election. Ryan Woods is a resident of Salt Lake City, Utah.

== Performer ==
Ryan Woods was raised in Salt Lake City, Utah, as a member of the Church of Jesus Christ of Latter-day Saints. By the late 2010s, Woods had established a reputation in the small community of drag queens in Salt Lake City, Utah, for his characterizations of Disney Princesses. Woods, who is gay, said that he felt ostracized when he decided to vocalize his support for Donald Trump to gay friends in the mid-2010s.

== Character ==
=== Debut ===
In August 2019, in posts to his social media accounts, Woods unveiled the Lady MAGA character declaring that "I support President Trump, and I believe that together we can make America gay … I mean great again!" According to Woods, his motivation for creating the Lady MAGA character was out of concern for the future of gun rights in the United States.

The Lady MAGA character was described by Real Clear Politics as approximately 6 ft 5 in (1.96 m) in height "with long blond hair ... a red-white-blue tutu and red 8-inch heeled knee-high go-go boots". "MAGA" is an acronym for "Make America Great Again", a campaign slogan used by the Donald Trump 2016 presidential campaign and Donald Trump 2020 presidential campaign.

=== Appearances ===
Lady MAGA attended a number of Trump and other political rallies in Utah during the 2020 United States presidential election, and addressed rallies organized by gay supporters of Trump in Los Angeles and Nashville in October 2020. She also appeared at the Conservative Political Action Conference in March 2020 in National Harbor, Maryland, among other conservative political events. Woods was present during a confrontation between supporters and opponents of Donald Trump in San Francisco's Mission District in early 2020, described by Mission Local as "a tense and bizarre scene".

=== Reception ===
Woods' unveiling of the Lady MAGA character was generally unwelcome by many drag queens in Utah, though the Salt Lake City Weekly also noted that though they disagreed with him, some felt Woods was "brave" for taking a political stand at odds with that generally accepted by the broader nonheterosexual community.

Woods has said that he is aware some Trump supporters were uncomfortable with his presence at Donald Trump campaign rallies but that he was generally "left alone" and that he "felt like the beauty of America is there's room for everyone, even people who might not want to bake me a cake at their bakery".

When he attended a demonstration to overturn the election in Freedom Plaza in November 2020, speaker Nick Fuentes pointed him out and said, "That is disgusting! I don't want to see that!" causing part of the crowd to chant "Shame!" at Woods.

Woods attended the 2023 CPAC in drag, prompting Matt Walsh to tweet a picture of him with the caption, "Absolute embarrassment. You are not conservative if you are fighting to conserve perversion." In March 2023, Woods posted that he no longer calls himself a drag queen, stating "I now prefer to call myself a costume artist...The drag world was one of the ways I could enjoy my talents, but they've destroyed their credibility with predatory filth."

Ryan, dressed in drag, was kicked out of a party during the 2026 Conservative Political Action Conference.

== See also ==
- Log Cabin Republicans
- Lucian Wintrich, a political activist who organized a "Twinks for Trump" unofficial campaign event in 2016
- Pink Pistols
- Obama Girl, a character performed by Amber Lee Ettinger who supported the Barack Obama 2008 presidential campaign
- Barry Humphries, a comedian and drag queen with similar positions on transgender rights
