= Peter Boykin =

American political candidate, podcaster, and author (born 1977)

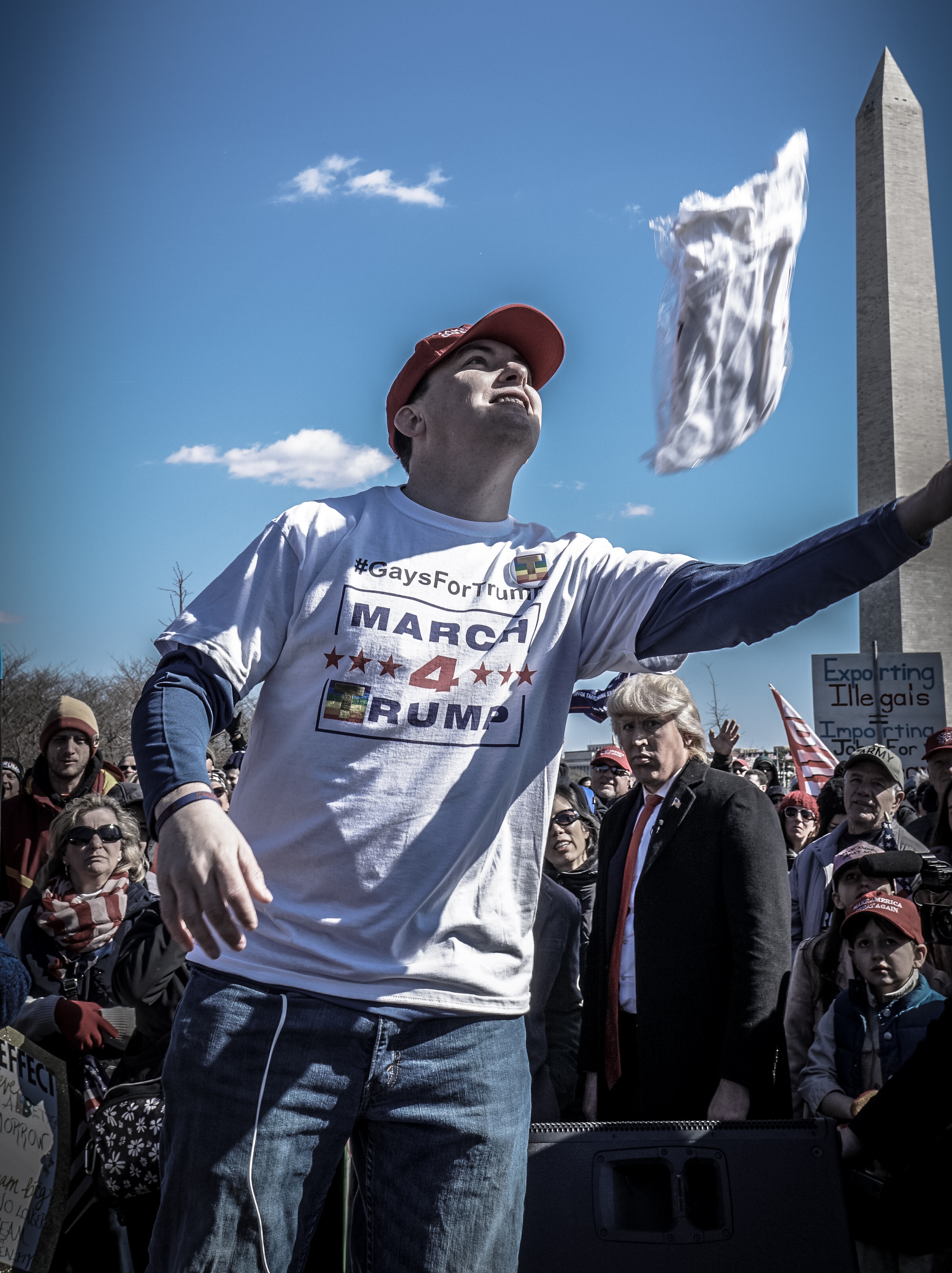
- Boykin at the March4Trump Rally in Washington DC
- Born: May 13, 1977 (age 49); Pensacola, Florida, U.S.
- Education: Danville Community College (Associate degree); Purdue University (BS, MS)
- Occupations: Activist; former political candidate
- Years active: 2016–present
- Website: peterboykin.com

Peter Boykin (born May 13, 1977) is an American activist, known for being the founder and president of Gays for Trump. A member of the Republican Party, Boykin was a candidate in the 2024 North Carolina lieutenant gubernatorial election.

== Early life and education ==
Peter Boykin was born in Florida and grew up in Virginia. He now resides in North Carolina. His parents were conservative Catholics who campaigned for Ronald Reagan.

He holds an associate degree in information systems technology from Danville Community College, a Bachelor of Science in web development, a Master of Science (M.S.) in information security and assurance from Purdue University, and a M.S. in e-commerce and entrepreneurship from Purdue.

== Political career ==
=== 2016 support for Donald Trump ===
Boykin is a public supporter of Donald Trump. In 2016, he founded the Gays for Trump organization which gained national attention as it solicited support from gay Americans for the candidacy of Donald Trump, mainly through social media messaging and outreach. Gays for Trump also organized events, like the "WAKE UP!" party at the 2016 Republican National Convention to celebrate Trump's nomination as the Republican Party candidate. In attendance were prominent far-right figures, such as former Breitbart news editor Milo Yiannopoulos. The event was also seen to link gays with the counter-jihad movement in the aftermath of the Orlando nightclub shooting, as other speakers included Pamela Geller and Geert Wilders.

=== 2018 North Carolina House election ===
In February 2018, he announced that he was running for the North Carolina House of Representatives to represent District 58. After advancing from the primary election on May 8, 2018, and receiving the backing of the North Carolina Republican Party, he lost in the general election on November 6, 2018, to the North Carolina Democratic Party candidate, Amos Quick by a margin of more than 50 percentage points.

=== 2021 US congressional election ===
In May 2021, he announced that he was running for US Congress to represent North Carolina after incumbent Ted Budd announced his departure from Congress to run for the Senate seat vacated by Richard Burr.

In November 2021, Boykin announced his intention to run in the newly-formed 7th Congressional District. However, Boykin later suspended his congressional campaign, instead opting to run for the North Carolina House of Representatives.

He later dropped out of the race due to map changes in his district.

=== 2022 North Carolina House election ===
In 2022, Peter Boykin ran for North Carolina House of Representatives House District 63; he failed to advance to the general election, garnering only 170 votes in the Republican primary.

=== 2024 North Carolina Lieutenant Governor election ===
Peter Boykin was a candidate for the office Lieutenant Governor of North Carolina in the 2024 election. He was defeated in the Republican primary with 3.46% of the vote.

2026 Alamance County Commisioner

In 2026, Peter Boykin ran to become the Alamance County Commissioner, and in his campaign, he supported a revenue neutral tax rate, which would adjust tax rates to offset the rising property costs.

== Activism ==
=== Rallies and events ===
After the 2016 election of Donald Trump, Boykin planned and hosted the "Gay" DeploraBall presidential inauguration event in Maryland, on the night of President Trump's inauguration.

There was a series of more than two dozen demonstrations organized throughout the United States on March 4, 2017, in support of President Trump. Boykin helped organize and ran the March 4 Trump event in Washington, D.C., at which Joy Villa and Andre Soriano were keynote speakers

In 2017, the organization Gays for Trump organized a "Make America Great Again Free Speech Rally" on the National Mall near the White House on Saturday, July 1, which 18 people attended. Boykin blamed the low turnout on people celebrating the July 4 holiday weekend.

Also in 2017, Boykin was the local coordinator for the Raleigh, North Carolina anti-sharia rally, one of a series organized nationally by ACT for America. Although exact counts were difficult to gauge, the fifty or so people gathered for the anti-sharia event were outnumbered by counter-protesters by a factor of five or six.

In the same year, he was a featured speaker at the Mother of All Rallies in Washington, D.C.

In 2018, Boykin held a second March 4 Trump rally at the Lincoln Memorial in Washington, D.C. The Washington Blade reported that about 100 people showed up around noon to the rally at the Lincoln Memorial, but then only 25 stuck around to march towards the White House after that.

He also makes regular appearances at his local Greensboro city hall to talk about various topics.

In July 2019, Boykin gave a speech at the "Demand Free Speech" rally held by the far-right Proud Boys organization in Washington, D.C., where he asked the crowd whether they'd be willing to "lay down your digital lives" to fight for freedom.

In July 2021, Boykin held an "American Pride Month" rally for the Peter Boykin For US Congress Campaign and The Triad Patriots in Graham, North Carolina, where he called for July to be honored as American Pride Month to honor All Americans.

Boykin acknowledged that he has also participated in online political groups along with the in-person rallies.

=== LGBT issues ===
A self-proclaimed "proud gay Republican," Boykin urged Americans to "get out of the bed and vote."

Boykin has publicly stated, "Straight, gay, bi, transgender, Democrat, liberal, Republican, conservative, Libertarian... I don't care, I am your representative."

In a 2018 interview in The Daily Beast, Boykin expressed support for President Trump's ban on transgender people serving in the United States military.

The outlet LGBTQ Nation claimed Boykin was "dangerous to trans people," a claim that Boykin has denied.

In 2025, he reaffirmed his support of Donald Trump, along with restating his disproval of transgender troops serving in the military, specifically mentioning the difficulty of guaranteeing privacy for transgender troops in shared buildings.

== See also ==
- 2022 United States House of Representatives elections
- Gays for Trump
- LGBT conservatism
- LGBT conservatism in the United States
- LGBT protests against Donald Trump
- North Carolina House of Representatives
