= For Trump =

for Trump may refer to:

- Bikers for Trump
- Blacks for Trump
- Black Voices for Trump
- Gays for Trump
- Latinos for Trump
- Students for Trump
- Women for Trump
