= Jeff Giesea =

American venture capitalist

- Education: Stanford University
- Occupation: Entrepreneur

Jeff Giesea is an American entrepreneur, communications specialist, and writer who was a business affiliate of several of Peter Thiel's companies and venture capital groups. He was widely known for coining the term "memetic warfare".

== Education and businesses ==
Giesea attended Stanford University, where he edited Thiel's libertarian student paper The Stanford Review. Giesea worked for Thiel's first hedge fund, Thiel Capital Management, and Thiel later provided the seed money for one of Giesea's companies. Between Thiel Capital management and his startup, Giesea worked for Koch Industries' public affairs office.

Giesea founded FierceMarkets, an online B2B media company. He sold the company to Questex Media in 2008 and left the company in 2009. AdAge named him a top innovator the small business category for its 2008 Top Innovators list.

He co-founded BestVendor, a free recommendation site for business apps, in January 2011. It entered open beta in November 2011 and by December had over 4800 users. The business received $600,000 in seed money from Peter Thiel, SV Angel, Lerer Ventures, and Softbank Capital. By December 2011, it had received $3.6 million from seed rounds and Series A funding. In 2013, BestVendor was acquired by Docstoc.

Following the sale of BestVendor, Giesea did a combination of angel investing and executive coaching. He wrote several articles for Harvard Business Review, including a well-known piece among post-exit entrepreneurs, “Dealing with the Emotional Fall-Out of Selling Your Business.”

== NATO and national security writings ==
Giesea has written several papers for NATO, mostly on the topic of information warfare. In early 2015, he published “It’s Time to Embrace Memetic Warfare” in NATO's peer-reviewed Strategic Communications Journal. In 2017 he published “Hacking Hearts and Minds,” about the need to allocate more resources to countering foreign information warfare. He spoke at NATO's Stratcom event in Riga that year as well. In 2019 he wrote “Alliance Cohesion in the Age of Populism,” which aimed at helping NATO adapt to the rise of populism while strengthening its original mission. In 2021, he published an article in American Affairs on "The Terrain of Discourse."

== Trump affiliations ==
Giesea supported Trump in 2016 and was an organizer in the early Trump movement. BuzzFeed credited him with being one of the minds behind the Trump meme army. Additionally, he helped organize a "Gays for Trump" party at the 2016 RNC following the Pulse nightclub shooting and was alleged to have been involved with the October 2016 pro-Trump art show where Milo Yiannopoulos bathed himself in pig's blood as a performance art piece commemorating victims of undocumented immigrants and Islamic terrorism.

Giesea was one of the organizers of the Deploraball, an Inauguration party celebrating the election of Trump in January 2017. He gave a speech there entitled, "A New Type of Republican," explaining that Trumpism was based on three principles: sovereignty, economic nationalism ("in particular a focus on making life better for the middle and working Americans, not just the top one percent") and putting America first.

In October 2017, Giesea formed a Super PAC called #Rev18 alongside Mike Cernovich and Jack Posobiec. Giesea described the PAC's goal as to promote anti-establishment candidates "who support American sovereignty and prosperity and who put the American citizen first". They closed #Rev18 the following month, explaining that they did not have enough time to devote to it. The Atlantic noted that this Super PAC was among the first examples of Trump supporters—a mostly online, Trump-centric group—venturing into electoral politics outside of support for Trump himself.

== Post-2020 political involvement ==
Giesea was not publicly involved in the 2020 election and has since denounced Trump. Reflecting on his past support for Trump, Giesea wrote in a 2022 blog post that, "By the 2020 election, I had lost passion for Trump and didn’t participate" while advocating that the American Right break from Trump. In another post, he described January 6 as a "coordinated attempt to interfere in the electoral process" and described how this realization impacted him personally. In June 2023, he endorsed Biden in an article titled, "The Trumpist Case for Biden." He wrote that "President Biden is more authentically pro-America than any of the leading Republican candidates including Trump or DeSantis." In August 2024, he endorsed Kamala Harris for President, writing that "Trump is fundamentally unfit."
