= First inauguration of Donald Trump =

58th United States presidential inauguration

First presidential inauguration of Donald Trump
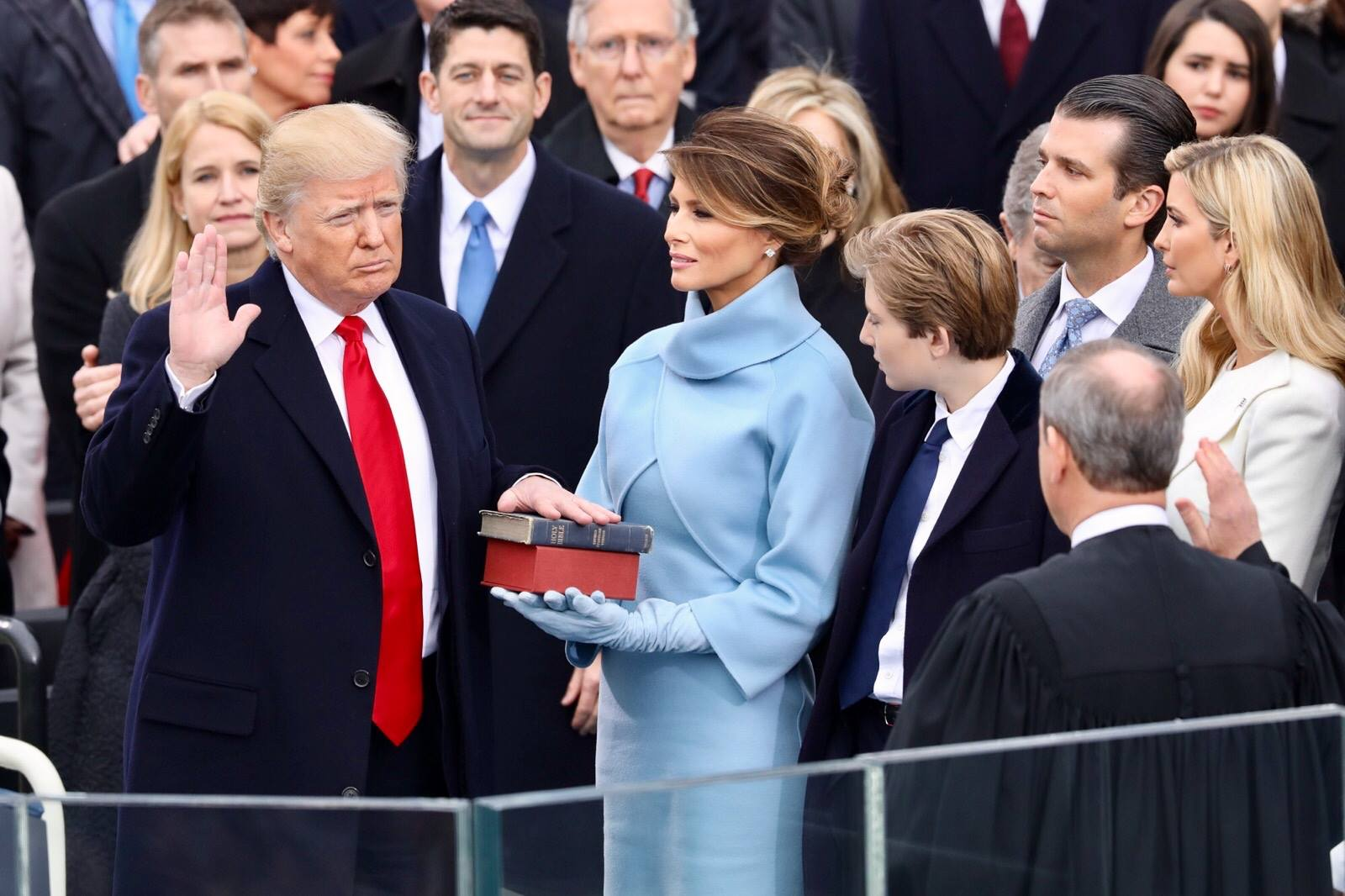
- Donald Trump takes the oath of office as the 45th president of the United States.
- Date: January 20, 2017; 9 years ago
- Location: United States Capitol, Washington, D.C.
- Organized by: Joint Congressional Committee on Inaugural Ceremonies, Inaugural Committee
- Participants: Donald Trump; 45th president of the United States — Assuming office John Roberts; Chief Justice of the United States — Administering oath Mike Pence; 48th vice president of the United States — Assuming office Clarence Thomas; Associate Justice of the Supreme Court of the United States — Administering oath
- Website: Trump Pence Inaugural Committee (archived)

The inauguration of Donald Trump as the 45th president of the United States marked the commencement of the first term of Trump as president and the only term of Mike Pence as vice president. An estimated 300,000 to 600,000 people attended the public ceremony held on Friday, January 20, 2017, at the West Front of the United States Capitol in Washington, D.C. The event was the 58th presidential inauguration. Held in Washington, D.C., from January 17 to 21, 2017, inaugural events included concerts, the swearing-in ceremony, a congressional luncheon, parade, inaugural balls, and the interfaith inaugural prayer service. The inauguration was protested worldwide. As of 2026, this remains the most recent ceremony to take place at the West Front of the Capitol with a full-size, open-air crowd, due to the events of COVID-19 during 2021 and the below-average temperatures during 2025.

Administered by Chief Justice of the United States John Roberts, the presidential oath was taken by Trump as his first task after becoming president, in keeping with Article Two, Section 1, Clause 8 and the 20th Amendment to the U.S. Constitution, with the vice presidential oath taken by Pence and administered by Associate Justice Clarence Thomas immediately preceding it. Trump was sworn in with his left hand on a pair of Bibles: his personal copy and the Lincoln Bible.

At 70 years, 220 days of age on Inauguration Day, Trump was the oldest person to assume the presidency. Four years later, in 2021, he was surpassed by Joe Biden at 78 years, 61 days. Trump reclaimed the title with his second inauguration, exactly eight years later, on January 20, 2025, at 78 years, 220 days of age.

== Context ==
The inauguration marked the formal culmination of Donald Trump's presidential transition that began with his election on November 9, 2016, him becoming the president-elect. Trump and his running mate Mike Pence were formally elected by the Electoral College on December 19, 2016. The victory was certified by an electoral vote tally by a joint session of Congress on January 6, 2017.

== Planning ==
The inauguration was planned primarily by two committees: the Joint Congressional Committee on Inaugural Ceremonies and the 2017 Presidential Inaugural Committee. The election was scheduled for November 8, 2016, but the congressional committee began construction of the inaugural platform on September 21.

Several artists approached to perform refused, including Jennifer Holliday, who originally intended to perform, but withdrew herself from the program after further consideration.

=== Joint Congressional Committee ===
The swearing-in ceremony and the inaugural luncheon for President-elect Trump and Vice President-elect Pence were planned by the Joint Congressional Committee on Inaugural Ceremonies, a committee composed of Sen. Roy Blunt of Missouri, the committee chair, and Senate party leaders Sen. Mitch McConnell Kentucky and Chuck Schumer of New York, and House speaker Paul Ryan of Wisconsin, and House party leaders Rep. Kevin McCarthy of California and Rep. Nancy Pelosi of California. The committee was overseen by the Senate Committee on Rules and Administration.

The Joint Congressional Committee on Inaugural Ceremonies chose the inaugural theme "Uniquely American" to highlight the inaugural ceremony as "a uniquely American expression of our Constitutional system" and stress the peaceful transition of power.

The Inauguration Committee released the full January 20 inaugural events schedule on December 21, 2016. Military support to the 58th inauguration was coordinated by Joint Task Force National Capital Region, providing musical military units, marching bands, color guards, ushers, firing details, and salute batteries.

=== Presidential Inaugural Committee ===
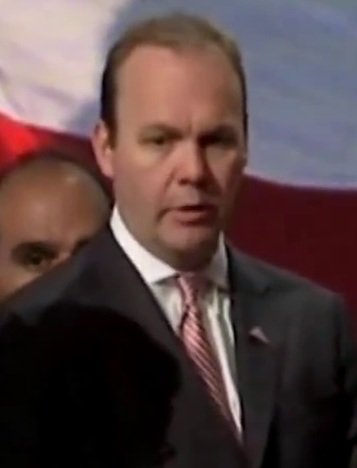
Rick Gates was deputy chairman of the inauguration.

The 2017 Presidential Inaugural Committee organized several other inauguration-related events at the direction of the president‑elect and vice president-elect of the United States, such as the concerts, parade, balls, and prayer service. The chairman of the committee was Thomas J. Barrack Jr., a real estate investor and longtime Trump friend and ally, and the founder of Colony Capital. The co-chairs of the committee were Lewis M. Eisenberg and Roy Bailey. Committee members included casino magnates Sheldon Adelson and Miriam Adelson, Steve Wynn, and Phil Ruffin, oil and gas entrepreneur Harold Hamm, businesswoman and film producer Diane Hendricks, coal businessman and philanthropist Joe Craft, Gail Icahn (wife of Carl Icahn), Dallasites Ray Washburne, Gentry Beach, Roy Bailey, and Woody Johnson, owner of the New York Jets.

The inaugural committee raised an unprecedented $107 million "from wealthy donors who gave $1 million or more." This was twice the amount raised by any previous inauguration committee. Observers agree that the actual inauguration expenses would have been a fraction of that amount, and the advocacy group Public Citizen has been seeking to know what happened to the remaining funds. Committee officials said they were evaluating charities to give the remaining funds to. In September 2017, the committee said it had given $3 million to three separate hurricane rescue organizations. An unspecified amount had also been used for redecorating the White House and Vice President Mike Pence's Washington residence. Thomas Barrack, the committee chair, said that further information about charitable donations would be released in November 2017, but no such announcement was made. The inauguration committee reported having $2.8 million in the bank as of October 2017.

According to a tax filing released on February 15, 2018, the committee donated $5 million to charity in 2017 – namely, the previously announced donations to hurricane relief, the White House Historical Association, and the Vice President's Residence Foundation. The majority of the committee's outlay – $57 million – went to four event-planning companies. The largest amount, $26 million, went to a California firm called WIS Media Partners, which was created in December 2016 by a close friend and advisor to Melania Trump, named Stephanie Winston Wolkoff, whose staff stayed at the Trump International Hotel during the planning of the inauguration. Wolkoff was personally paid about $500,000 for the inauguration. Twenty-four million dollars went to an independent organization, "Inaugural Productions", for the staging of several events. The committee reported nearly $15 million in administrative expenses, including $9.4 million for travel and $4.6 million for salaries and benefits for 208 employees. The committee spent more than $1.5 million at the Trump International Hotel. Ivanka Trump helped negotiate a rate of $175,000 per day for the committee's use of the hotel's Presidential Ballroom and meeting rooms after Gates and Wolkoff complained that Trump International Hotel managing director Mickael Damelincourt attempted to charge them above-market rates.

== Pre-inaugural events ==
=== Diplomat summit: Chairman's Global Dinner ===
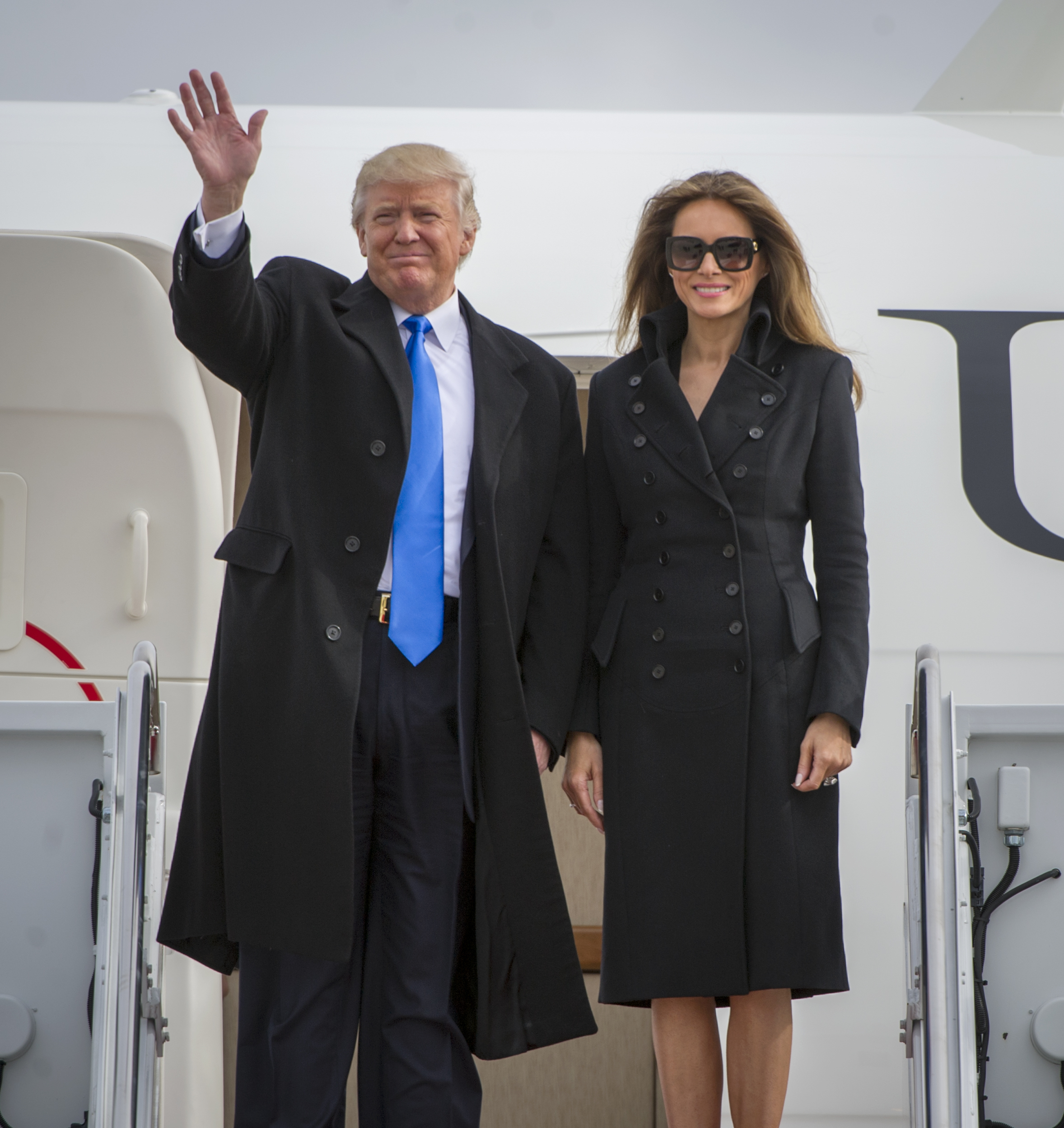
Then-President-elect Trump and his wife, Melania, arriving at Joint Base Andrews in Washington, D.C. for the inauguration

On Tuesday, January 17, then-President-elect Trump arrived in Washington, D.C., to attend what was titled the "Chairman's Global Dinner," a high-profile dinner that was intended to serve as an introduction between foreign diplomats and the incoming Trump administration officials and appointees. The dinner was black tie and invitation-only, and was described by The Wall Street Journal as the most high-profile event preceding the inauguration, with both Trump and Vice President-elect Mike Pence addressing the gathering. The event was held at the Andrew W. Mellon Auditorium.

Rex Tillerson, Trump's choice to succeed John Kerry as secretary of state, was in attendance, as well as former New York City mayor Rudy Giuliani and National Security Advisor-designate Michael T. Flynn, and Israeli ambassador Ron Dermer, according to reporters in attendance at the event. More than 200 foreign diplomats attended the event out of 500 total guests. During his speech to the group, Trump praised his choices thus far for Cabinet positions as well as his choice of Pence as his vice president. According to The Boston Globe and the Associated Press, the menu included mustard black cod and filet mignon as entrees, and baked Alaska for dessert.

=== Voices of the People concert ===
On the morning and afternoon of January 19, a day-long "Voices of the People" public concert was held at the Lincoln Memorial. The concert featured The King's Academy (West Palm Beach, Florida) Honor Choir, the Republican Hindu Coalition, the Montgomery Area High School Marching Band, Marlana VanHoose, the Maury NJROTC Color Guard, the Pride of Madawaska, Webelos Troop 177, the Northern Middle School Honors Choir, the American Tap Company, the Everett High School Viking Marching Band, the TwirlTasTix Baton Twirling group, and three bagpipe groups.

=== Arlington National Cemetery wreath laying ceremony ===
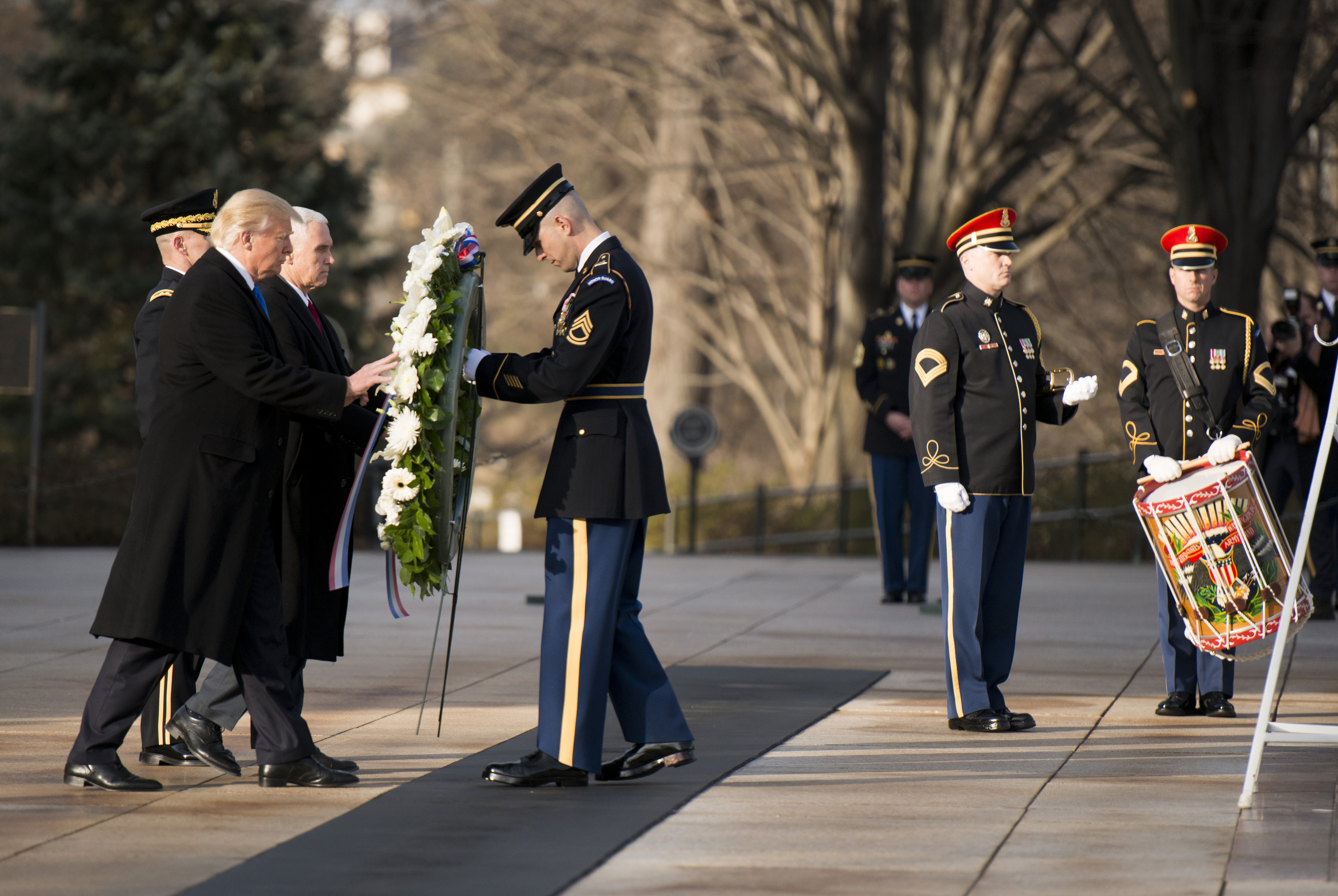
Donald Trump and Mike Pence at the wreath laying ceremony at the Tomb of the Unknown Soldier

After returning home to New York City, Trump returned to Washington, D.C., on Thursday, January 19, arriving at Joint Base Andrews on a plane flown by the U.S. Air Force.

Trump and Vice President-elect Pence attended a luncheon at Trump's hotel at the Old Post Office Pavilion, and afterwards, the official wreath laying ceremony at the Tomb of the Unknown Soldier at Arlington National Cemetery, accompanied by his wife and family. Trump and Pence were escorted by Major General Bradley Becker at the ceremony. The Arlington National Cemetery is the burial place of more than 400,000 people, mostly members of the armed forces, Medal of Honor recipients, and high ranking political officials.

=== Make America Great Again Welcome Celebration concert ===
On the evening of January 19, Trump hosted the "Make America Great Again! Welcome Celebration," a concert for his supporters that were attending his inauguration the following day. The concert, held on the steps of the Lincoln Memorial, featured performances by Lee Greenwood (who performed "God Bless the USA"), Toby Keith, 3 Doors Down, DJ Ravidrums, The Piano Guys, and The Frontmen of Country (Tim Rushlow, Larry Stewart, and Richie McDonald). Trump addressed his supporters at the end of the festivities, saying that the "forgotten man and the forgotten woman will not be forgotten anymore". Actor Jon Voight also spoke at the event, stating, "We have been witness to a barrage of propaganda that left us all breathless with anticipation, not knowing if God could reverse all the negative lies against Mr. Trump, whose only desire was to make America great again." The concert concluded with a fireworks celebration, accompanied by a U.S. military choir and band performing the Battle Hymn of the Republic.

=== Church service and White House reception ===
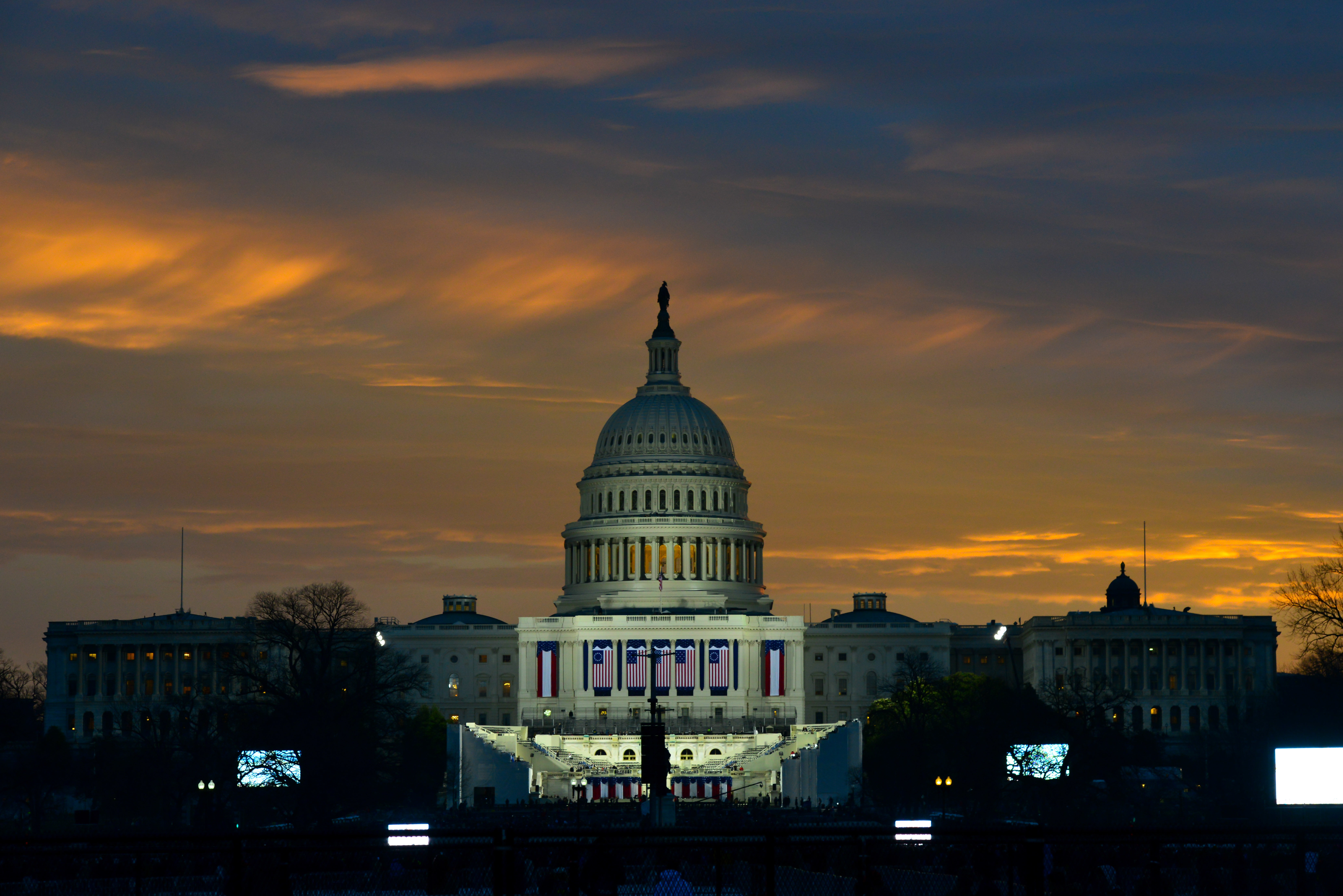
Preparations at the United States Capitol in Washington, D.C. as the sun begins to rise on the morning of the inauguration

On the morning of the inauguration, on January 20, after staying the night at the Blair House, the traditional house used by the incoming president-elect due to its proximity to the White House, Trump and his wife, Melania, and Mike Pence and his wife, Karen, attended a church service at St. John's Episcopal Church. The tradition dates back to James Madison, with every president since then attending the church service the morning of their inauguration. The service was led by Robert Jeffress, a Southern Baptist minister who campaigned for Trump during the election.

After the church service, Trump and his wife went to the White House to meet with President Barack Obama and First Lady Michelle Obama. The Obamas greeted the Trumps, and Melania presented the couple with a gift. They then posed for photos in front of the White House press corps. The presentation of a gift was a tradition started by Michelle Obama when she presented George W. Bush and Laura Bush with a gift on the day of her husband's inauguration in 2009. Afterward, they held a tea reception inside the White House, along with Vice President Joe Biden and his wife, Jill Biden, and Mike Pence and his wife, Karen Pence. As per tradition, following the meeting between the president and the president-elect, they shared the presidential motorcade limousine, and made their way to the Capitol for the inaugural ceremony.

== Inaugural events ==
=== Ceremony ===
Barack and Michelle Obama welcoming Donald and Melania Trump outside of the White House

The ceremony was held at the West Front of the Capitol building. The weather conditions for 12 noon at Ronald Reagan Washington National Airport, located 3.1 miles from the ceremony, were: 48 °F (9 °C), wind 5 mph, and cloudy. Outgoing U.S. President Barack Obama, outgoing U.S. Vice President Joe Biden (who later defeated Trump in 2020 and then inaugurated as the 46th president in 2021), former U.S. presidents Jimmy Carter, Bill Clinton, and George W. Bush, and former U.S. vice presidents Dan Quayle and Dick Cheney, along with their respective wives, attended the inauguration, including Hillary Clinton, who had been Trump's main opponent in 2016 (Clinton was attending as a former first lady, not as the losing candidate). Former U.S. president George H. W. Bush and former first lady Barbara Bush could not attend due to their health issues, and former U.S. vice presidents Walter Mondale and Al Gore were also absent.

Roy Blunt commenced the inauguration ceremony at 11:41 a.m. with welcoming remarks about the nation's "commonplace and miraculous" tradition of a peaceful transition of power. Courtney Williams, Senior Chief Musician and concert moderator for the U.S. Navy Concert Band, returned as the platform announcer for his 3rd consecutive inauguration. Three religious figures delivered invocations, followed by the Missouri State University chorale performing an original work, "Now We Belong". After short remarks, Chuck Schumer ended his speech by asking everyone to stand for the Vice-Presidential swearing-in.

==== Oath of office ====
Mike Pence takes the vice presidential oath of office, administered by Supreme Court Justice Clarence Thomas.

Donald Trump takes the presidential oath of office, administered by Chief Justice John Roberts.

At 11:54 a.m., Associate Justice Clarence Thomas swore in Mike Pence as the 48th vice president of the United States, with Pence's hand on his personal Bible as well as the Bible of Ronald Reagan, the politician who inspired Pence to join the Republican Party. Pence became the first vice president to be sworn in by an African-American justice of the Supreme Court. A performance of "America the Beautiful" by The Tabernacle Choir at Temple Square followed. At noon, Trump became the 45th president of the United States, taking the oath of office with Chief Justice John Roberts. Trump was also sworn in using two Bibles, a Bible his mother gifted him and the historic Lincoln Bible. After the swearing-in, the Marine Band performed "Hail to the Chief" and Trump received the traditional 21-gun salute in his honor.

==== Inaugural address ====
Donald Trump delivers his first inaugural address as president of the United States.

President Trump then delivered his 16-minute inaugural address of 1,433 words. The speech was the shortest inaugural address since Jimmy Carter's in 1977.

In late December 2016, Trump told visitors that he was writing the first draft of his inaugural address, citing previous inauguration speeches by John F. Kennedy and Ronald Reagan as inspirations. Trump "insisted publicly that he wrote his own speech," although The Wall Street Journal and others reported that it had been written by Trump senior aides Stephen Miller and Steve Bannon.

The speech struck a tone that was both nationalist and populist, with suggestions of absolutism and distrust of democracy. The Los Angeles Times described the address as "a truncated version of Trump's campaign rally addresses, absent specific policy and big on a sense of anger at what he defined as a ruling class that has raided America for its own benefit." Historians and speechwriters termed the inaugural address as "one of the most ominous" in U.S. history, striking an unusually dark and bleak note.

Trump pledged to end what he referred to as "American carnage," depicting the United States in a dystopian light—as a "land of abandoned factories, economic angst, rising crime"—while pledging "a new era in American politics."

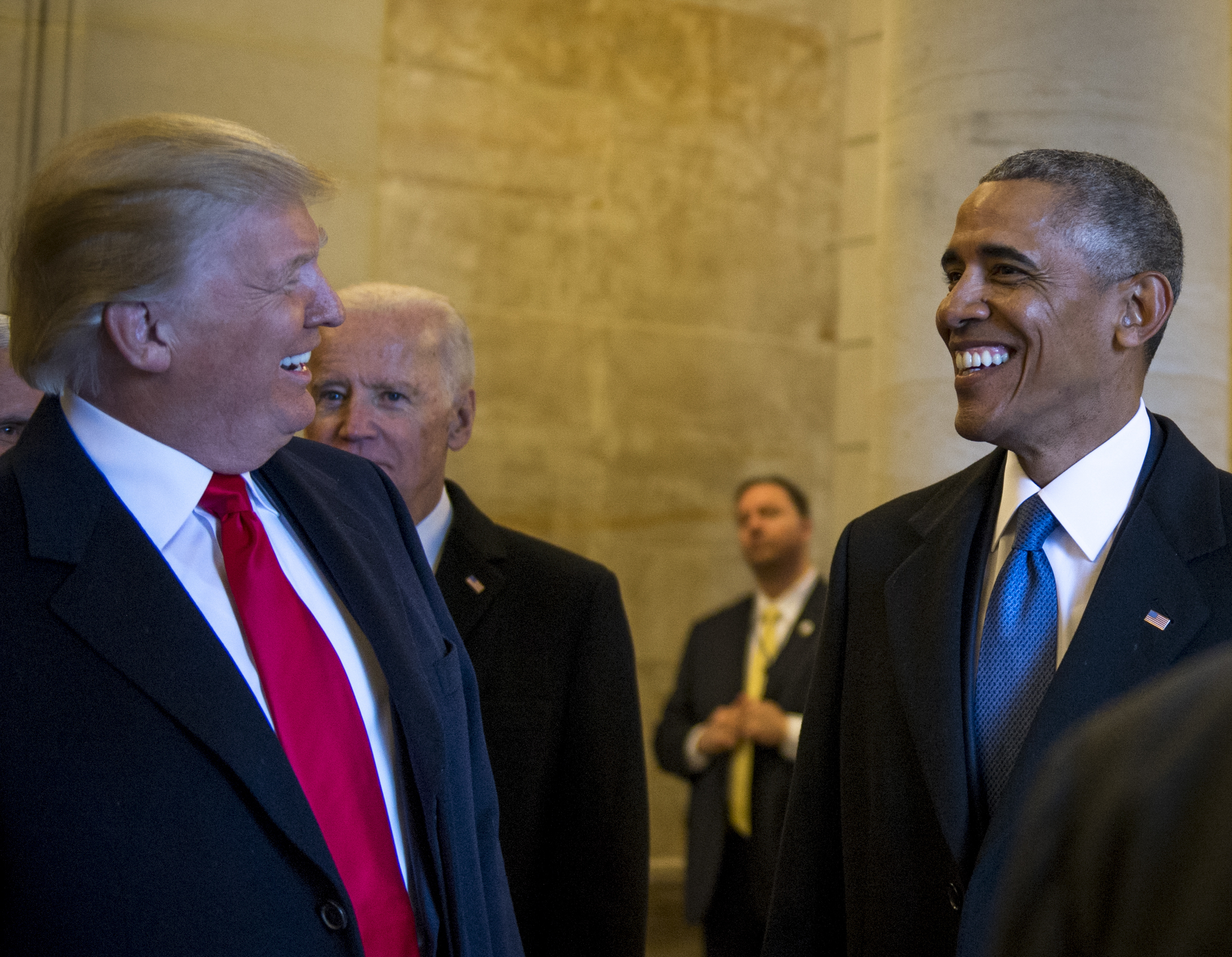
Barack Obama with Donald Trump on Inauguration Day. Joe Biden stands behind Trump.

Fact-checking organizations, such as FactCheck.org, PolitiFact, and The Washington Post's Fact Checker claimed that Trump's portrayal of the United States in decline "did not always match reality." The fact-checking organizations noted, among other things, that the U.S. violent crime rate was far below its 1991 peak; that the U.S. economy had gained jobs for 75 consecutive months and that unemployment was significantly below its historical average; and participation in U.S. welfare programs had declined.

In the speech, Trump repeated his campaign-trail "America First" slogan in reference to economic and foreign policy issues. Trump's use of the phrase was controversial because of the slogan's association with U.S. isolationists who had opposed American entry in World War II. Trump's decision "not to make a strong case for the role of American power in shaping the outside world was a departure from the inaugural addresses of recent Republican presidents from Ronald Reagan to George W. Bush," and represented "a sharp break with the internationalist vision of nearly every U.S. president of the past 100 years that troubled veteran foreign policy experts." Nevertheless, Trump's themes on foreign policy appealed "to many Americans as well as to critics of Washington's bipartisan foreign policy establishment."

==== Benedictions ====
Three religious leaders delivered benedictions following Trump's speech, bringing the total number of prayers during the ceremony to six, a record number. Reverend Franklin Graham; Cardinal Timothy M. Dolan, Archbishop of New York; Reverend Dr. Samuel Rodriguez; Pastor Paula White; Rabbi Marvin Hier; and Bishop Wayne T. Jackson gave the benedictions. Jackie Evancho concluded the ceremony with a performance of the U.S. national anthem.

=== Post-ceremony events ===
After the inaugural ceremony, President Trump, First Lady Melania Trump, Vice President Mike Pence and Second Lady Karen Pence escorted former president Barack Obama and former first lady Michelle Obama to a departure ceremony on the east side of the U.S. Capitol. The Trumps exchanged remarks and bid farewell to the Obamas at the base of the helicopter that would transport them to Joint Base Andrews, and then returned to the steps of the Capitol building where they waved as the Obamas' helicopter took off. Meanwhile, the Bidens took a limousine to Union Station where they boarded a train for Wilmington, Delaware. Before the luncheon and in keeping with tradition, President Trump signed his first presidential orders in the President's Room at the Capitol, and then signed the guest book for the luncheon.

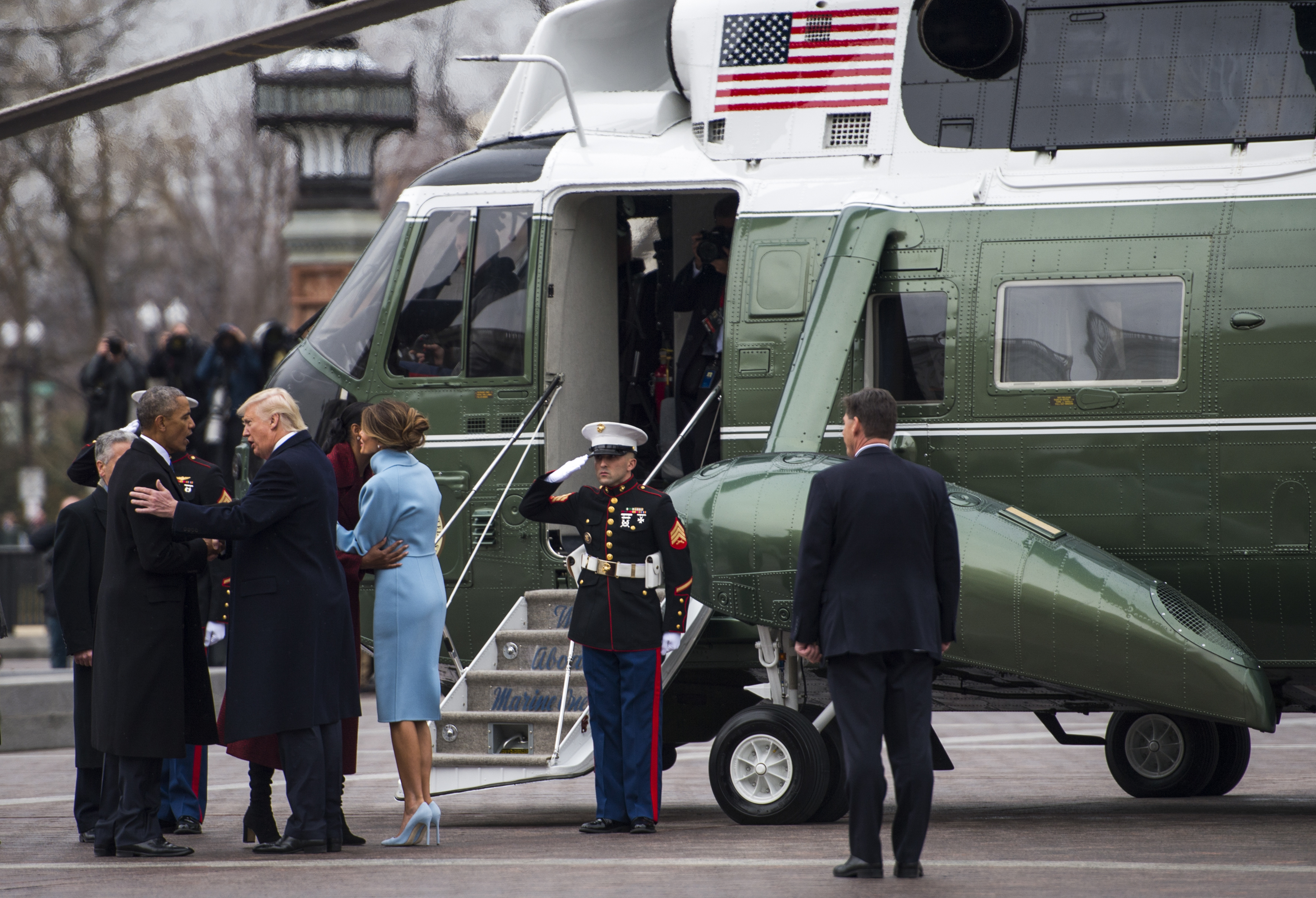
President and Mrs. Trump bidding farewell to former president and Mrs. Obama on the East Front of the U.S. Capitol

Next, Trump signed orders to officially present the nominations for his Cabinet and several sub‑Cabinet officials to the Senate for confirmation. His first bill that he signed into law was a waiver of the National Security Act of 1947 granted to him that allowed the nomination of retired general James Mattis to be nominated for the position of United States secretary of defense. The National Security Act of 1947 requires a seven-year waiting period before retired military personnel can assume the role of Secretary of Defense. Mattis became only the second secretary of defense to receive such a waiver, following George Marshall, who served under President Harry S. Truman. Following in tradition, Trump used various commemorative pens to sign the Cabinet nominations, and distributed them among the lawmakers and guests that had gathered. The pens are traditionally given as a gift to politicians or individuals touched by the action, or were instrumental in its implementation.

Trump also signed a proclamation declaring his inauguration a National Day of Patriotic Devotion. In this he followed Barack Obama, who declared his a National Day of Renewal and Reconciliation, and previous declarations of periods of patriotism by such former presidents as Jimmy Carter and Ronald Reagan.

Trump was accompanied at the signing ceremony by his wife, and children, and several of his grandchildren, as well as the chairs of the Joint Congressional Inauguration Committee, including senators Roy Blunt, Mitch McConnell and Chuck Schumer, and Congressional leaders Paul Ryan, Kevin McCarthy and Nancy Pelosi. During the ceremony, the lawmakers joked with President Trump, he handed pens to participants (e.g. Elaine Chao's nomination pen to Nancy Pelosi, Trump stating, because "they were both women") and then traded pens in an offer to give, not as an ask to receive (Nancy Pelosi gave Elaine Chao's nomination pen to Chao's husband, Mitch McConnell). The Trumps and Pences then attended an inaugural luncheon at the U.S. Capitol before traveling from there to the presidential reviewing stand at the White House to watch the parade.

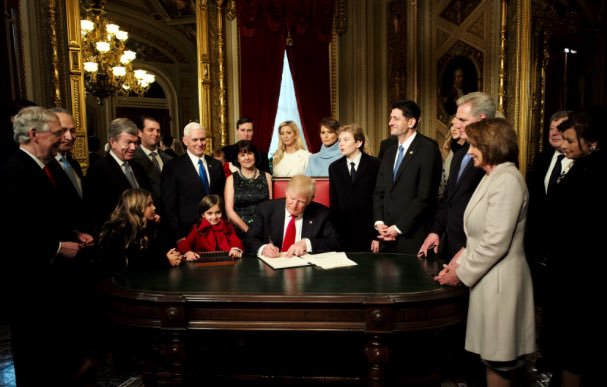
President Trump signing his first official orders as president, including nominating his Cabinet

=== Luncheon ===
The Trumps and Pences joined several congressional guests for the inaugural luncheon in National Statuary Hall at the U.S. Capitol. Guests included top Washington lawmakers as well as former presidents and vice presidents. During his formal address at the lunch, Trump asked those in attendance to give Hillary Clinton, one of his opponents during the 2016 election, a standing ovation.

A luncheon at the U.S. Capitol has been part of the inaugural program since 1953 (before that time, the luncheon was usually held at the White House and hosted by the outgoing president and first lady). The menu for the 2017 inaugural luncheon, which in the past has often featured dishes representative of the home states of the new president and vice president, included more traditional dishes from around the country. The first course consisted of Maine lobster and Gulf shrimp with saffron sauce and peanut crumble, accompanied by a J. Lohr 2013 Arroyo Vista Chardonnay. The second dish contained Seven Hills Angus beef in dark chocolate and juniper jus with potato gratin, served with a Napa Valley Cabernet Sauvignon, and dessert included a chocolate soufflé and cherry vanilla ice cream with Korbel California champagne. Since 1985, a painting has served as a backdrop for the head table. For the 2017 inaugural luncheon, the featured painting was George Caleb Bingham's The Verdict of the People, which depicts a Missouri town and its citizens both celebrating and mourning the election victory of what historians say was a likely proslavery candidate.

=== Parade ===
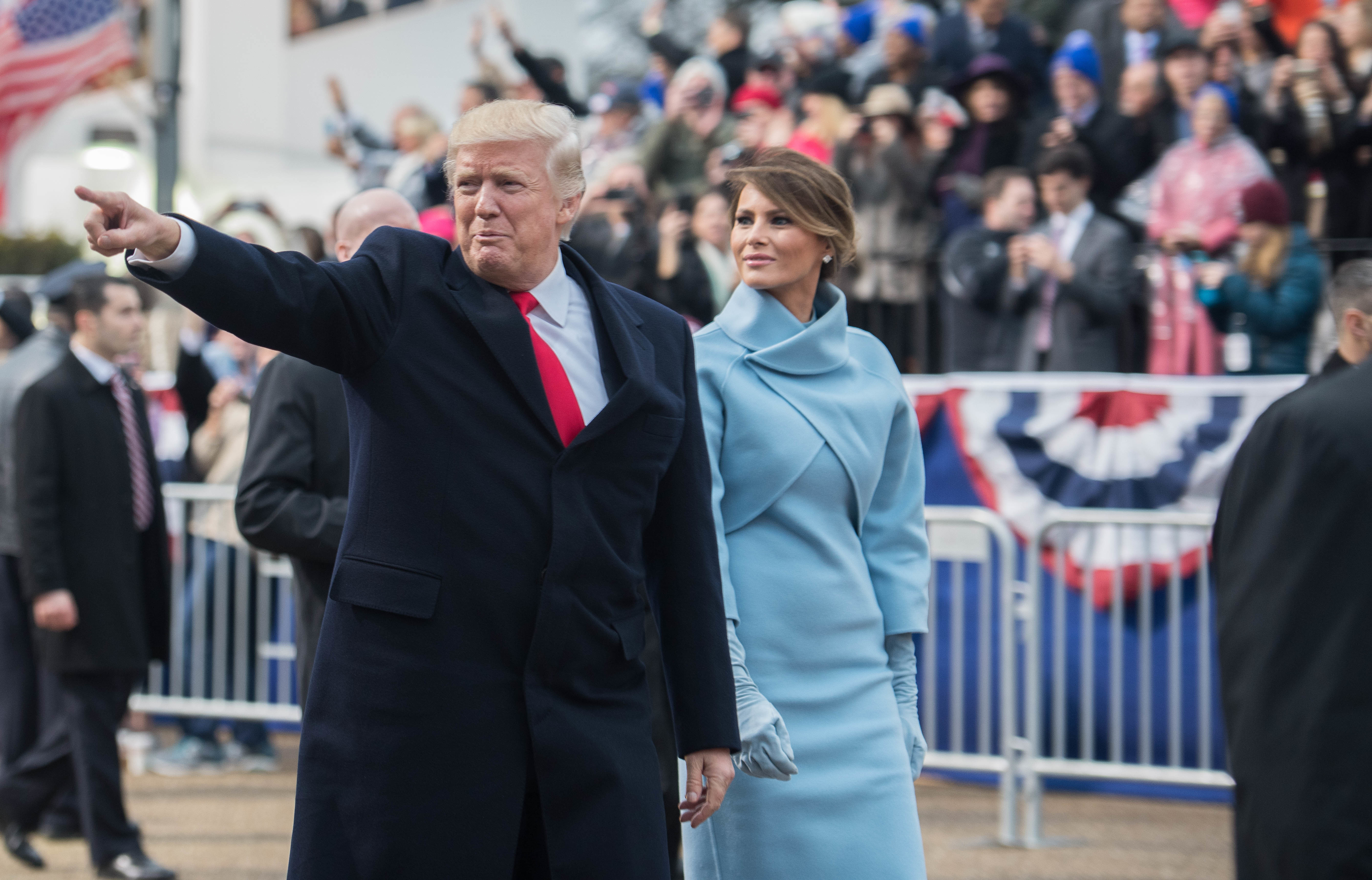
President Donald Trump and First Lady Melania Trump walking the parade route on Pennsylvania Avenue

Following the luncheon, Trump, Pence, and their wives reviewed an honor guard of troops at the East Front of the U.S. Capitol before beginning the parade. The inaugural parade route ran along Pennsylvania Avenue, NW from the U.S. Capitol, ending at the north face of the White House. During most of the parade, President Trump and First Lady Melania Trump traveled in the armored limousine used by the president because of potential security threats. The president and first lady exited their limousine twice, walking on Pennsylvania Avenue for portions of the parade, a longstanding custom. Vice President Pence and his wife Karen walked the parade route at several points with their children as well.

The parade lasted approximately two hours during the afternoon and early evening following the inaugural ceremony. Parade participants included more than 8,000 people, "representing forty organizations including high school and university marching bands, equestrian corps, first responders, and veterans groups," according to the Joint Congressional Inauguration Committee. Each branch of the United States military was also represented.

Vice President Mike Pence invited several groups from Indiana to march in the parade in the Indiana section, including the Indianapolis Metropolitan Police Department Drill Team, the Culver Military Academy, and the Columbus North High School marching band from Pence's native Columbus, Indiana. Shortly after the parade, Trump went to the Oval Office to sign his first executive orders as president, including an order to start the process of dismantling the Affordable Care Act.

=== Inaugural balls ===
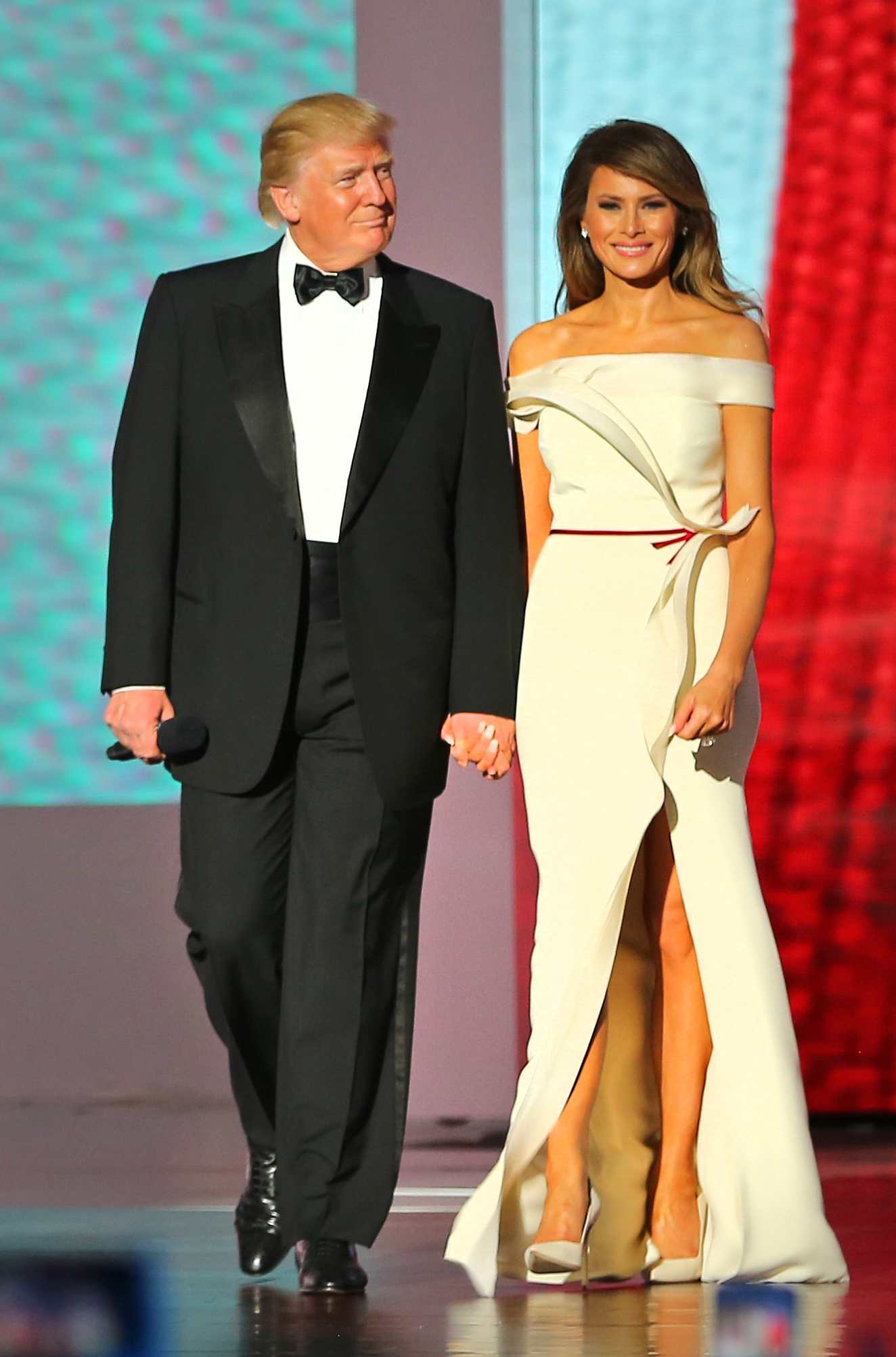
The President and First Lady at the Liberty Ball on the evening of the inauguration

President Donald Trump and First Lady Melania Trump attended three official inaugural balls during the evening of January 20, 2017, titled "Liberty and Freedom: The Official Presidential Inaugural Balls." President Trump wore a classic black tuxedo, with a white button up shirt, and a black bow tie, in keeping with tradition. First Lady Melania Trump wore a white, off-the-shoulder, sleeveless gown designed by French-American fashion designer Hervé Pierre. Pierre has also designed dresses for first ladies Laura Bush, Hillary Clinton and Michelle Obama, and he has been styling for Melania Trump for several years. The dress featured a front slit, a ruffled accent and a thin red belt to cinch the waist.

The Liberty Ball, one of two official balls held at the Walter E. Washington Convention Center, was the first stop of the evening for the president and first lady. The Trumps danced to their first song, which was chosen to be "My Way" by Frank Sinatra, and was performed by Erin Boheme, an American jazz singer. In an attempt to allow more access to the inaugural balls, the Presidential Inauguration Committee announced that they intended to make the inaugural balls the most affordable in recent history, offering $50 tickets to either the Liberty or Freedom Balls. The second ball that the Trumps attended was the Freedom Ball, also held at the Walter E. Washington Convention Center, and also featured a first dance to "My Way", as with the Liberty Ball.

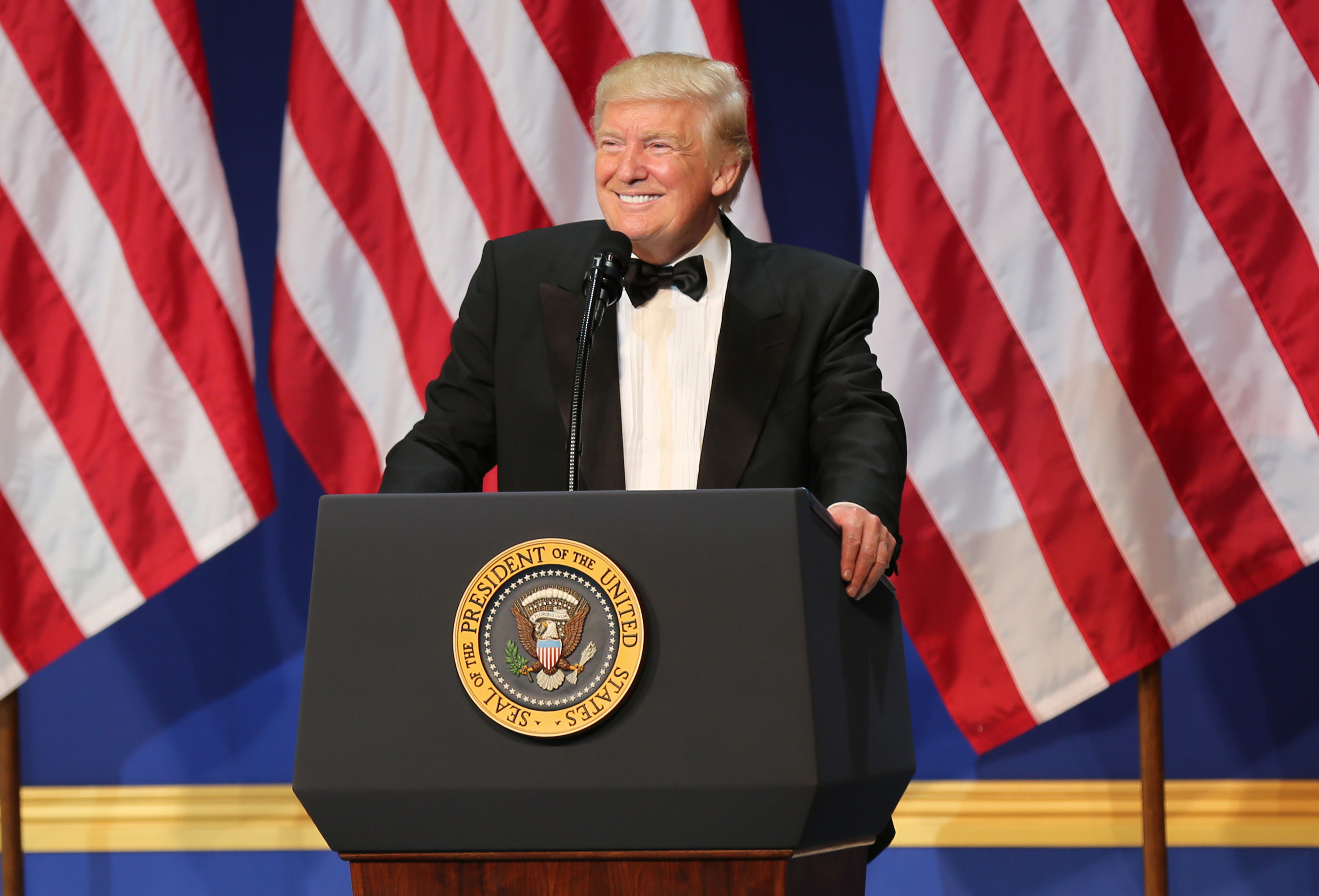
President Trump speaking at the Armed Services Ball

The third ball that the president and first lady attended was the Salute To Our Armed Services Ball, which took place at the National Building Museum. The ball was by invitation only, with free tickets being provided to "active duty and reserve military, Medal of Honor recipients, wounded warriors, military families, veterans, and first responders," according to the Presidential Inauguration Committee. At the beginning of the ball, Trump and his wife, Melania, addressed the crowd of gathered service members, and then spoke via satellite with active duty soldiers in Bagram Airfield, Afghanistan. Trump thanked the active duty soldiers for the congratulations on his inauguration as Commander-in-chief. Tony Orlando and the Josh Weathers Band performed at the Armed Services Ball.

It is tradition for the president and first lady, and the vice president and second lady, to dance with military service members during the Armed Services Ball. Sgt. Angel Rodriguez, who danced with Second Lady Karen Pence, drew attention for his dancing style, spinning the Second Lady, which provoked playful laughter from Tiffany and Eric Trump.

=== Prayer service ===
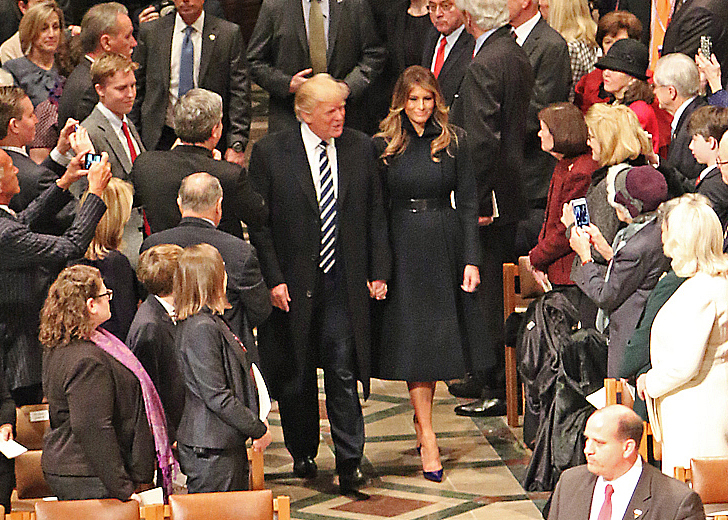
President Trump and First Lady Melania Trump arriving at Washington National Cathedral for the national prayer service

On January 21, President Trump, First Lady Melania Trump, Vice President Pence and Second Lady Karen Pence gathered at the Washington National Cathedral for a national day of prayer, a tradition dating back to the first president, George Washington. Among the parishioners were more than two dozen religious leaders from a variety of different faiths. Marlana VanHoose, a 20-year-old vocalist who was born with cytomegalovirus, performed at the ceremony, singing "How Great Thou Art". Melania Trump was visibly emotional during the performance, and led a standing ovation for her after she finished performing. The service began with call to prayer by the Reverend Rosemarie Duncan, Mikhail Manevich, a Jewish cantor, and Mohamed Magid, a Muslim imam. The clergy spoke of both compassion and diversity.

== Crowd size ==
Attendance at presidential inaugurations per Vox
Year	Attendance
Clinton (1993)	800,000
Clinton (1997)	250,000
G. W. Bush (2001)	300,000
G. W. Bush (2005)	400,000
Obama (2009)	1,800,000
Obama (2013)	1,000,000
Trump (2017)	600,000

Before the event, federal and local agencies had prepared for turnout of between 700,000 and 900,000 people. Trump predicted that there would be "an unbelievable, perhaps record-setting turnout" at his inauguration.

The National Park Service does not publish crowd estimates about events at the National Mall. Overhead imagery and statistics on public transportation ridership from the Washington Metropolitan Area Transit Authority (WMATA), which operates Metrorail, are therefore used to estimate crowd sizes.

The WMATA reported that 193,000 passengers rode the Metro before 11 a.m. on the day of Trump's inauguration, and 570,557 passengers during the entire day, noting that it was lower than the average weekday ridership of 639,000 passengers. USA Today reported on a "notable number" of empty seats along the parade route.

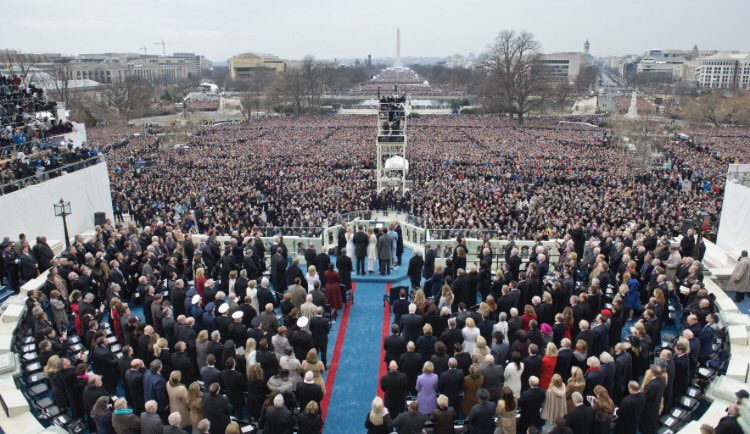
Inauguration of Donald Trump

Crowd counting experts cited by The New York Times estimated that about 160,000 people were in the National Mall areas in the hour leading up to Trump's speech. Crowd science professor Keith Still estimated the total attendance at 300,000 to 600,000 people, or one-third the estimated 1.1 million to 1.8 million people that attended Obama's 2009 inauguration – which set a record for the total number of people in the National Mall at any one given time, and which marked the inauguration of the nation's first African American president. CNN provided a gigapixel panorama of the area.

=== Administration response ===
White House Press Secretary Sean Spicer giving Trump administration's statement on crowd size in his January 21 press conference (extract)

In a press conference on January 21, Sean Spicer, Trump's White House press secretary, stated that the crowd "was the largest audience ever to witness an inauguration, period, both in person and around the globe", and accused the media of reporting false crowd estimates to "lessen the enthusiasm of the inauguration". Spicer also stated that 420,000 people rode the Metro on the day of Trump's inauguration, and that only 317,000 rode on the day of Obama's. In fact, 570,557 Metro trips were taken on the day of Trump's inauguration, compared to 1.1 million on Obama's 2009 inauguration day and 782,000 on Obama's 2013 inauguration day. Ridership at 11 a.m. was 193,000, 513,000 and 317,000 respectively.

Numerous sources highlighted the fact that Spicer's statements were incorrect, and many accused him of intentionally misstating the figures. In response, Donald Trump's counselor and spokesperson, Kellyanne Conway, in an interview with NBC's Chuck Todd, stated that Spicer merely presented "alternative facts". Todd responded by saying "alternative facts are not facts. They're falsehoods."

On January 23, Spicer admitted his error concerning WMATA ridership levels, stating that he was relying on statistics given to him, but he stood by his claim that the inauguration was the most-viewed, stating he also included online viewership in addition to in-person and television in his estimates. Spicer's claim of the largest audience ever was still shown inaccurate as Nielsen reported 30.6 million viewers across 12 networks while Obama had 37.8 million and Ronald Reagan 41.8 million. As for online viewership, Spicer himself cited a figure of 16.9 million livestreams provided by CNN. However, CNN served nearly 27 million streams in 2009 for Obama's inauguration. CNN reported in 2009 that 7.7 million people watched the inauguration online, while nearly 27 million watched streaming video of any sort on CNN's website on that day. NBC's livestream on YouTube of Trump's inauguration in 2017 accumulated over 8 million views within a day.

The incoming administration briefly shut down the Interior Department's Twitter accounts. The National Park Service's official Twitter account had re-tweeted two Tweets on "omissions on policy areas" on the White House website and Trump's and Obama's crowd sizes. An NPS spokesman issued an apology for "mistaken RTs".

On the morning following the inauguration, Trump telephoned acting National Park Service director Michael T. Reynolds and personally directed him to produce additional aerial photographs of the Inauguration Day crowds. Reynolds and the Park Service complied with the directive; the additional photos, however, "did not prove Trump's contention that the crowd size was upward of 1 million." In September 2018, documents released from a Freedom of Information Act request showed that Reynolds and the National Park Service cropped photos of the inauguration, at the direction of the President, in an attempt to make the crowd size seem larger.

=== Edited photos ===
In September 2018, a government photographer admitted that he, at Trump's request, edited photos of the inauguration to make the crowd appear larger: "The photographer cropped out empty space 'where the crowd ended' for a new set of photos requested by Trump on the first morning of his presidency, after he was angered by photos showing his audience was smaller than Barack Obama's in 2009."

== Protests and demonstrations ==
Protesters in Washington D.C. at Trump's inauguration

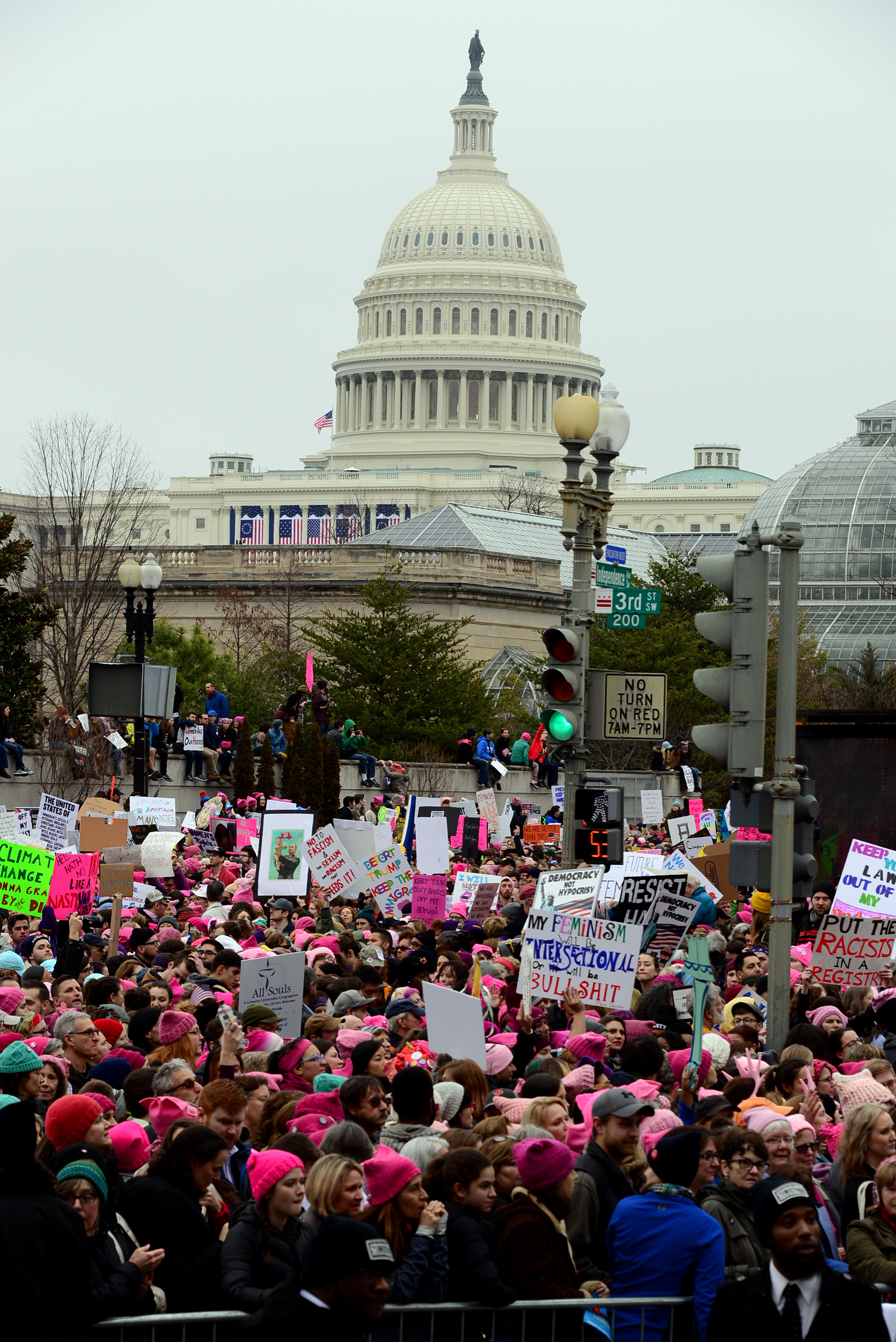
Demonstration in Washington D.C.

As of mid-December, there were 20 requests for demonstration permits for Trump's inauguration, including Bikers for Trump, and the Women's March on Washington, which took place the day after inauguration day. Supported by nearly 200 activist groups and organizations, and drawing an estimated three times as many participants as the inauguration, the Women's March demonstrated on racial and gender equality, affordable healthcare, abortion rights and voting rights.

Bikers for Trump was founded by Chris Cox in 2016. The goal of the group was to ride to Cleveland, OH on their motorcycles to assist with the Republican National Convention and rally behind Trump.

Protests occurred during the inauguration ceremonies in Washington, D.C. The vast majority of protesters, several thousand in all, were peaceful. DisruptJ20 protesters linked arms at security checkpoints and attempted to shut them down. Some elements of the protesters were black bloc groups and self described anarchists, and engaged in sporadic acts of vandalism, rioting, and violence. Six police officers sustained minor injuries, and at least one other person was injured.

A total of 234 people were arrested and charged with rioting, launching controversial trials that gave rise to allegations that the government was overreaching. Ultimately, 21 defendants pleaded guilty, and all other defendants were either acquitted or had charges dropped by prosecutors; the government failed to obtain a guilty verdict at any trial. In December 2017, the first six people to be tried in connection with the events of January 20 were acquitted by a jury of all charges. Twenty other defendants pleaded guilty and prosecutors dropped cases against 20 others. In January 2018, prosecutors dropped charges against 129 other defendants. In May 2018, prosecutors dropped charges against seven more defendants, after the court found that prosecution had intentionally made misrepresentations to the court and hidden exculpatory evidence from defendants in violation of the Brady rule, and prosecutors also reduced charges against others. Finally, in July 2018, the government dropped charges against all remaining defendants.

Sixty-seven Democratic U.S. representatives declined to attend Trump's inauguration, citing "what they described as his alarming and divisive policies, foreign interference in his election and his criticism of civil rights icon John Lewis, a congressman from Georgia".

== DeploraBall ==
DeploraBall was conceived in early November 2016 by a marketing team as a brand name for various parties and events celebrating the election of Donald Trump. Among the organizers were Jack Posobiec, Jeff Giesea, and Mike Cernovich. The loosely organized GOTV group MAGA3X became one of the first sponsors of a DeploraBall event, which MAGA3X originally announced would be held on January 19, 2017, (the night before the Trump inauguration) at the Clarendon Ballroom in Arlington, Virginia. After MAGA3X had sold over 500 tickets, the Ballroom declined to host the event, stating that no event contract had been signed and that the venue had decided not to issue a contract "due to the suspicious actions of the organizers" in selling tickets before a contract was in place; however, event organizers alleged that the Ballroom had acquiesced to pressure from Hillary Clinton supporters. The Ballroom subsequently became "overwhelmed" with harassing phone calls and threats, although Arlington County police said there were no "credible" threats.

MAGA3X then announced that the event would move to the National Press Club. Following the change of venue, one of the original organizers, Tim Gionet (known online as "Baked Alaska"), was reportedly banned from the DeploraBall by Cernovich and Giesea after posting "anti-Semitic and racist comments" on Twitter, sparking an online argument with Cernovich. White supremacist Richard Spencer was also uninvited from the event. Cernovich subsequently told TMZ that racist gestures, such as the Nazi salute, were banned from the event. Images of Pepe the Frog were also banned. Other MAGA3X organizers also made statements disavowing any affiliation between the DeploraBall and white nationalism. The organizers' limitations on speech and banning of Gionet and Spencer were criticized by some alt-right members as bowing to mainstream pressure. Both the outgoing and the incoming presidents of the National Press Club stated that the club would hold the private event in honor of the incoming President Trump "as we have for incoming presidents of both parties for decades", but would neither endorse nor sponsor the event.

=== Event ===
On the evening of January 19, 2017, the MAGA3X DeploraBall event was held at the National Press Building (the Washington, D.C. headquarters of the National Press Club). The event had sold out its 1000-ticket capacity in advance. Although journalist Milo Yiannopoulos had been invited, he did not attend. Political consultant Roger Stone arrived at the venue, but left without entering the event after learning the organizers had not provided sufficient tickets for his family members accompanying him. The event was broadcast live by Right Side Broadcasting Network. To mark the conclusion of DeploraBall, Scott LoBaido painted a "live-speed" portrait of Donald Trump.

A second Washington, D.C.-area inaugural ball dubbed "Gays for Trump DeploraBall Gala" was held at the Bolger Center Hotel in Potomac, Maryland, on the following evening, January 20, 2017. The event was attended by over 200 people. Another "Gays for Trump DeploraBall" was planned to be held on July 4, 2017; however, the event was renamed and pushed back to July 1. Additional inaugural events using the DeploraBall name took place in other US locales, including California, North Carolina, Arizona, and Ohio. According to the official DeploraBall marketing website, over 50 DeploraBall events were held nationwide and in three countries around the time of the Trump inauguration.

Attendees included Milwaukee sheriff David Clarke, activist James O'Keefe, businessman Martin Shkreli, and social media personalities Mike Cernovich, Jim Hoft, and Gavin McInnes.

A similarly named inaugural celebration called the "Deplorables Inaugural Ball" was organized by Deplorables Nation and took place at the Ronald Reagan Building and International Trade Center on the evening of January 19, 2017.

=== DeploraBall protests ===
Protests outside the DeploraBall in Washington, D.C., on January 19, 2017

A few weeks before the DeploraBall, members of Project Veritas infiltrated meetings of the protest groups DisruptJ20 and the DC Antifascist Coalition, and filmed members discussing plans to disrupt and "crash" the DeploraBall. According to an affidavit released by police, three people associated with the protest groups plotted to get into the National Press Club and tamper with the sprinkler system to release butyric acid, acting as a stink bomb, over the DeploraBall attendees. At least one conspirator had purchased tickets to the event, which were cancelled by the organizers upon seeing the Veritas videos. After the videos became public, a spokesperson for the protest groups claimed that their members knew Veritas was monitoring them, and deliberately fabricated the alleged DeploraBall plot, which they did not intend to actually carry out, in order to distract the Veritas infiltrator from their real protest plans. The video led to the arrests of three men involved in the plot, all of whom later pled guilty to conspiracy charges.

During the evening of January 19, hundreds of anti-Trump protesters demonstrated outside the National Press Building. Protesters clashed with police in riot gear, who formed a human shield to protect DeploraBall attendees as they arrived and entered the building. Protesters also threw bottles at attendees who were leaving the venue. One Trump supporter suffered a head injury after being hit by a protester. Ellison Barber of local CBS affiliate WUSA-TV reported that she had seen "at least four fights" outside the venue. A young boy at the protest, later identified by TMZ as the 11-year-old son of actor Drew Carey, told a Fox News reporter at the scene that he had started a fire in the street near the venue. Police eventually used pepper spray to disperse the protesters.

== Viewership ==
Nielsen ratings showed that TV viewership of the inauguration in the US was 30.6 million, more than Obama's second inauguration in 2013 (20.6 million), but less than Obama's first inauguration in 2009 (38 million) and Reagan's first in 1981 (42 million). Trump's inauguration became the most streamed Twitter video during the site's decade-long history with more than 6.8 million views.

There were 16.63 million viewers of Trump taking the oath of office and giving his inaugural address on the three major cable news networks: Fox News Channel, CNN, and MSNBC. The number of viewers for Obama in 2009 was more at 17.06 million and in 2013 less at 6.73 million. According to Nielsen data, there were 30.64 million people who viewed Trump's inauguration on the 12 networks that covered it live.

Legend

Cable news network
Broadcast network

Total cable TV viewers
11:45 am to 12:15 pm Eastern

Network	Viewers
Fox News	11,768,000
CNN	3,375,000
MSNBC	1,487,000

Total cable TV viewers
8:00 to 11:00 pm Eastern

Network	Viewers
Fox News	6,958,000
CNN	4,528,000
MSNBC	1,621,000

Total television viewers
11:00 am to 4:00 pm Eastern

Network	Viewers
Fox News	8,771,000
NBC	5,895,000
ABC	4,899,000
CBS	4,653,000
CNN	2,610,000
MSNBC	1,377,000

Source: Adweek

== Investigations ==
Multiple investigations related to Trump's inauguration were launched, including:

- A House Intelligence Committee investigation into possible attempts to obstruct the committee's investigation of Russian election interference and links between Trump associates and Russian officials.
- A House Judiciary Committee investigation into potential obstruction of justice and abuse of power by Trump and the Trump administration
- An investigation by the U.S. Attorney's Office for the Southern District of New York into whether the Trump inaugural committee filed false FEC reports or accepted illegal contributions from foreign nationals. The investigation was a partial outgrowth of a recording seized by the FBI in which Trump's personal lawyer and "fixer" Michael D. Cohen discuss possible irregularities with inauguration contractor Stephanie Winston Wolkoff.
- An investigation by the U.S. Attorney's Office for the Eastern District of New York involving the business and political dealings of Elliott Broidy, a major financier of Trump's campaign and inauguration.
- An investigation by the New Jersey attorney general regarding contributions to Trump's inaugural committee.
- An investigation by the Attorney General for the District of Columbia regarding the role on the inaugural committee of Trump's children, Donald Jr., Ivanka, and Eric, and payments to the Trump International Hotel and Trump Organization.

=== Investigation by the special counsel ===
News reports surfaced in April 2018 that the Special Counsel investigation is looking into the inaugural committee's finances. Prosecutors have questioned several Russian oligarchs, upon their arrival at a U.S. airport, about whether any Russian money was illegally funneled into the inauguration committee or the Trump campaign itself. Robert Mueller's team has questioned Barrack and other witnesses, reportedly asking about "donors with connections to Russia, Saudi Arabia, the United Arab Emirates and Qatar." Counterintelligence agents with the FBI began investigating this possibility immediately after the inauguration itself, their interest sparked by the large number of wealthy Russians who attended the inauguration and the special events that attended it.

Samuel Patten plea agreement

In August 2018, American political consultant W. Samuel Patten, an associate of Trump campaign chairman Paul Manafort, pleaded guilty in federal court to failure to register as a foreign agent in connection with the illegal funneling of foreign funds to the presidential inauguration committee. Patten admitted to arranging a "straw donation" in which $50,000 was funneled from a Ukrainian businessman to a U.S. citizen to donate to the committee in exchange for four tickets to the inauguration. Patten also admitted to giving misleading testimony to the Senate Intelligence Committee about the matter. In exchange for a recommendation of a lenient sentence, Patten pleaded guilty and agreed to cooperate with Special Counsel investigation led by Robert Mueller.

In court documents, prosecutors wrote that Patten formed a lobbying and consulting firm with a Russian national identified as "Foreigner A"; the firm was paid for work advising the Ukrainian Opposition Bloc party and some Bloc members, including "a prominent Ukraine businessman identified only as 'Foreigner B.'" The Washington Post and The New York Times identified Konstantin Kilimnik (a Manafort associate whom prosecutors allege is a Russian intelligence operative) as "Foreigner A" and Serhiy Lovochkin (a former aide to Viktor Yanukovych, the pro-Russian former president of Ukraine) as "Foreigner B." Kilimnik attended Trump's inauguration.

=== Investigation by U.S. attorney's office in New York ===
The Wall Street Journal and The New York Times reported in December 2018 that federal prosecutors in Manhattan and Brooklyn are investigating whether Middle Eastern foreigners sought to buy influence over American policies by using straw donors to illegally funnel donations to Trump's inaugural committee and a pro-Trump Super PAC.

The Trump inaugural committee received a subpoena from federal prosecutors on February 4, 2019. The SDNY subpoena demanded a comprehensive array of documents involving the committee's donors, finances, attendees and activities. The subpoena named one person of interest: fundraiser Imaad Zuberi. The subpoena reportedly covered allegations of conspiracy to defraud the United States government, money laundering, false statements, mail and wire fraud, disclosure violations and prohibitions against contributions by foreign nations.

=== Investigations by New Jersey attorneys general ===
The attorney general of New Jersey issued subpoenas for documents to the inaugural committee in February 2019.

=== Trump's settlement with the D.C. Attorney General ===
The office of Attorney General for the District of Columbia Karl Racine served a subpoena to the inaugural committee in February 2019 as part of an investigation. In 2020, the office sued the inaugural committee, accusing it of violating D.C. laws governing nonprofits by improperly paying more than $1 million to Trump International Hotel during inauguration week. Racine said that the inaugural committee had paid in excess of market rates for the Trump hotel space as part of scheme to enrich the Trump family. Records were subpoenaed from Ivanka Trump, Melania Trump, and Trump associate Thomas Barrack Jr. Ivanka Trump gave five hours of deposition testimony in December 2020 as part of the suit. In May 2020, Trump settled the lawsuit for $750,000; according to a lawyer for Trump's inaugural committee, half of the settlement payment was paid by the inaugural committee, and the other half by Trump family companies.

== See also ==
- Russian interference in the 2016 United States elections
- Donald Trump 2016 presidential campaign – American political campaign
- First presidential transition of Donald Trump – Transfer of presidential power from Barack Obama to Donald Trump
- First 100 days of the first Trump presidency – Period from January to April 2017
- Second inauguration of Donald Trump – 60th United States presidential inauguration
- First presidency of Donald Trump – 2017–2021 U.S. presidential administration
- Timeline of the first Trump presidency (2017 Q1)
- Timeline of the first Trump presidency (2017 Q2)
