= Joy Villa =

American singer

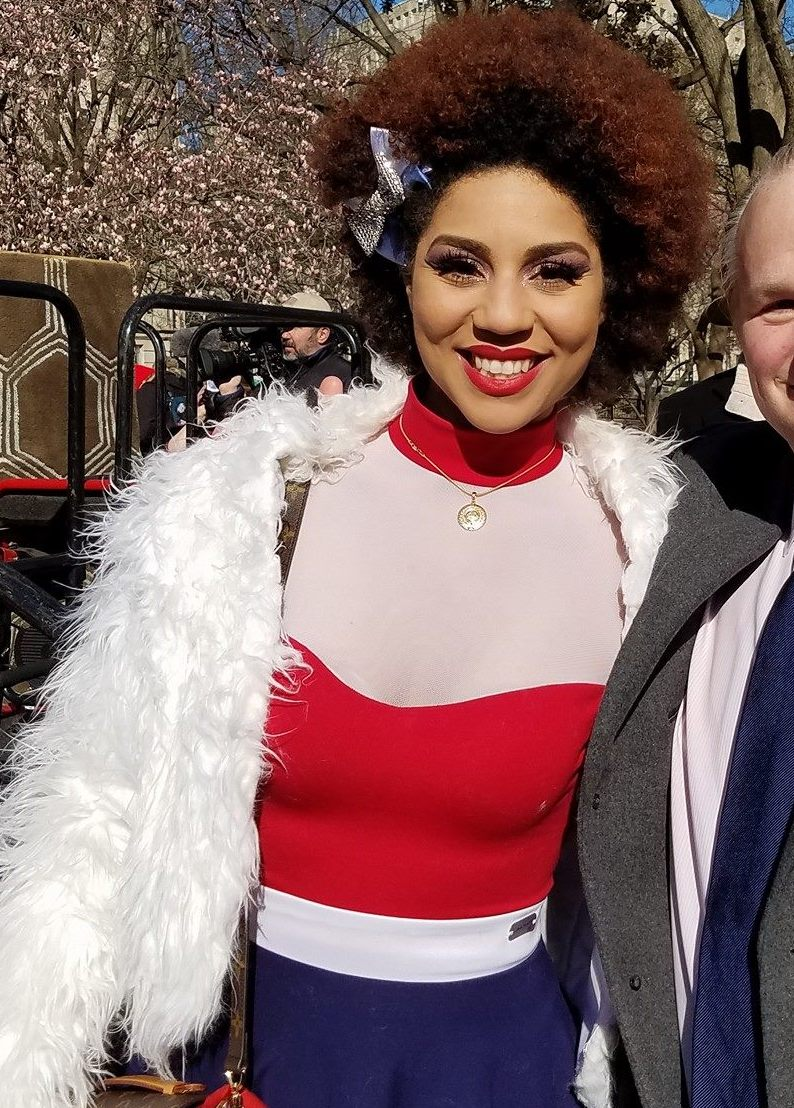
- Joy Villa at the "Spirit of America" rally in 2017

Background information
- Born: Joy Angela Villa; April 25, 1986 (age 40); Orange, California, U.S.
- Genres: Pop; pop rock
- Occupations: Singer; songwriter
- Instrument: Vocals
- Years active: 2001–present
- Spouse: Jeremy Lifsey (m. 2024)
- Website: www.joyvilla.com

Joy Angela Villa (/ˈviːlə/; born April 25, 1986) is an American singer-songwriter, actress, and right-wing YouTuber. A political conservative, Villa is known for her outspoken support of U.S. President Donald Trump, as well as her former support for the Church of Scientology.

== Early life ==
Villa was born in Orange, California. Her father, Joseph Villa, was an Italian-Argentine, while her mother Mildred Angela Pierce Villa was African American and had some Choctaw ancestry. Her maternal great-uncle was jazz vocalist Kenny Hagood. She attended high school at Lompoc High School, and graduated in 2004.

== Entertainment career ==
Villa has worked as an actress and producer. From age 14 to 16, she was with Youth Network TV on Comcast Television. These roles include starring as a lovestruck young woman in romantic comedy "The Contrast", Kushite Princess Amesemian in "Brigantia", an umbrella-wielding carny in the Heroes Season 4 episode "Orientation", and other appearances on CSI: NY, The Valley Girls and MTV Next.

=== Grammy Award outfits ===
Villa is known for her flamboyant outfits which she has worn to the Grammy Awards. These include:

- For the 2015 Grammy Awards, she wore a see-through dress made entirely out of orange construction-fencing material, designed by Andre Soriano. The dress was called "unusual" and "a first."
- For the 2016 Grammy Awards, she wore a similarly see-through dress consisting mostly of fabric spikes. The Huffington Post named it as one of its "Most Outrageous Looks From The 2016 Grammys."
- At the 2017 Grammy Awards, Villa wore a blue dress, again designed by Andre Soriano, promoting President Donald Trump, featuring his campaign slogan "Make America Great Again" and the name "Trump". The publicity from the dress may have helped Villa's EP I Make the Static hitting number 1 among digital downloads on Amazon.com, and iTunes in the US. It climbed up the top 100 of several other countries' iTunes charts too, including Canada, the United Kingdom, Australia and Brazil. The album sold over 15,000 copies in the following two days, and debuted on the Billboard charts the next week at number 12 with 29,000 album equivalent units, 27,000 of which were pure album sales. The EP also ranked number 2 on the Digital Albums chart and number 6 on the Top Album Sales chart, as well as being the top-selling rock/alternative album of the week.
- At the 2018 Grammy Awards, Villa wore a white dress with a hand-painted fetus inside of a rainbow uterus on it along with a purse bearing the slogan, "Choose Life."
- At the 2019 Grammy Awards, Villa wore a reflective silver dress with a black outline of bricks all around except for an area with "Build the Wall" spelled out in red in a large section on the backside of the garment, borrowing the font of Pink Floyd's The Wall. She also wore a metallic collar signifying a barbed wire fence, a spiked crown referencing the Statue of Liberty, and sported a red "Make America Great Again" handbag.
- At the 2020 Grammy Awards, she wore a red, white and blue pro-Trump dress that said "impeached and re-elected" on the back.
- At the 2025 Grammy Awards, she wore a red cap reading "The Hat Stays On" on the front.

== Political advocacy ==
Villa is a supporter of Donald Trump, having joined Donald Trump's Campaign Advisory Board. Villa had stated that she supported Senator Bernie Sanders early in the 2016 United States presidential election but soon switched to supporting Trump in the general election.

On May 5, 2018, Villa joined the UK March for Life in London. She led the march from Trafalgar Square to Parliament Square.

In 2019, during a debate against a Black Lives Matter activist, Joy Villa referred to Black Lives Matter as a "terrorist organization". She also said that the movement does not address Black-on-Black crime and that most people who have been killed by the police are criminals. Villa earlier supported BLM and was using a #blm hashtag the day after the 2016 election. She later said she supported Black Lives Matter "until they started killing cops".

Villa has supported the far-right QAnon conspiracy theory, and has on a number of occasions worn QAnon-themed clothing accessories. In September 2019, Villa was scheduled to speak at the QAnon-themed "Digital Soldiers Conference", which was later cancelled.

In 2020 Joy Villa Productions received $12,000 from ViralPAC for marketing.

On November 9, 2020, Villa appeared at a Trump Rally in Mount Juliet, Tennessee. Villa said, "Because come Inauguration Day we will see the truth. That President Trump will again be their president." Villa also said that "God is on our side" and advised the crowd to trust in God, saying, "We know he [Trump] was chosen for a time such as this. This could have been the main reason that he's in office.". Villa also stated that she could not understand how gender-neutral people could be confused about their gender identity.

On November 10, 2020, Villa appeared on RT America, which is a part of the Russia Today network, a global multilingual television news network based in Moscow, Russia. Villa commented on the 2020 US president election, stating, "There is too much voter fraud allegations coming about; we see dead voters who have come up from the grave and miraculously voted for Joe Biden."

== Personal life ==
Joy Villa grew up in New York City and Santa Barbara, California, and has toured in over 25 countries including Denmark, South Africa, France, Italy, Indonesia, Japan, South Korea, Singapore and Mexico, often visiting Scientology centers in those countries.

Villa was a Scientologist and described herself as a "Christian Scientologist". Scientology quoted her in 2016 crediting the religion for "[giving] me tools to survive, tools to create, and that’s what I feel like—a creative person who is full of power and there is no stopping me." In May, 2025, Villa announced on her webcast that she had left the Church of Scientology, and that she had detailed her experience in the church and her decision to leave in a memoir, From Scientology to Christ: The Escape They Never Wanted Me to Make.

On November 28, 2017, Villa filed a police complaint against Trump's former campaign manager Corey Lewandowski for allegedly slapping her buttocks at a holiday party at the Trump International Hotel Washington D.C. Villa admitted she waited a month before talking to police. Villa alleged that after she told him that she could report him for sexual harassment, Lewandowski said, "I work in the private sector", and slapped her again. Lewandowski did not deny these allegations, but maintained, "There is a due process and there is a process which they will go through to determine a person’s innocence."

On November 15, 2020, at a Nashville-based "Stop the Steal" rally, Joy Villa said that God had told her to move from California to Nashville, Tennessee.

Villa announced on her Facebook page that she married Jeremy Lifsey on October 14, 2024.

== Discography ==
=== Extended plays ===
Title	Details	Peak chart positions			Sales
Title	Details	US	US Rock	US Alternative	Sales
I Make the Static	Release date: July 11, 2014; Format: Digital download	—	—	—	US: 29,000
Home Sweet Home	Release date: January 25, 2018; Format: Digital download	—	—	—	

=== Singles ===
- "Cold Wind" (2011)
- "Drop Him Off" (2012)
- "Vagabonds" (2014)
- "Run and Hide" (2014)
- "Beautiful" (2014)
- "Get Your Freedom" (2014)
- "Play" (2015)
- "Empty" (2016)
- "Make America Great Again!" (2017)
- "Devil in the City" (2018)
- "Lost" (2018)
- "The Star Spangled Banner" (2018)
- "Home Sweet Home" (2018)
- "Freedom (Fight For It)" (2019)

== See also ==
- Black conservatism in the United States
