= Gays for Putin! =

Gays for Putin! Геи за Путина!
- Leader: Alexei Nazarov
- Founded: 2018
- Ideology: LGBT advocacy Putinism
- Slogan: 1. GayZaPutinz; 2. GZaP; 3. GaysSupportPutin

Gays for Putin! (Russian: Геи за Путина!) is a Russian LGBTQ group that supports Vladimir Putin, endorsing his 2018 presidential campaign. The tongue-in-cheek initiative began following a homophobic presidential campaign ad in early 2018.

== History ==
Gays for Putin! held its first demonstration to support Putin's presidential campaign on 3 March 2018 after filing a notice in Smolny. The demonstration was held in St. Petersburg, the hometown of Putin and Vitaly Milonov, a self-described "demon hunter" who can "smell gays" and authored the local law that was the model for the national gay propaganda law. After submitting an application to the Smolny profile committee, a couple of gays attended a service in the nearby Smolny Convent of St. Petersburg, praying for the success of a good undertaking. Also that month, the Moscow gay group members also held a demonstration in Moscow.

Maxim Neverov, a sixteen-year-old co-founder of Gays for Putin, submitted 12 applications for pro-Putin and LGBTQ public events to city officials in Biysk. He applied for permission for a performance of a Gays for Putin play, and rallies to recognize Putin as a saint and defending gay people named Vitaly. Authorities rejected his applications and published his address and phone number on the internet. In an interview with Nederlandse Omroep Stichting, Neverov said he was picked up from his school by authorities and forbidden from organizing the events. In July he received a letter from the police accusing him of spreading gay propaganda and ordering him to appear before a committee. Neverov was the first minor to be charged and convicted under Russia's gay propaganda law. He was ordered to pay a 50,000 ruble fine for three photographs that appeared in a private album on VK. The conviction was overturned on appeal.

== See also ==
- LGBT rights in Russia
- List of LGBT-related organisations
