= Bikers for Trump =

American political group

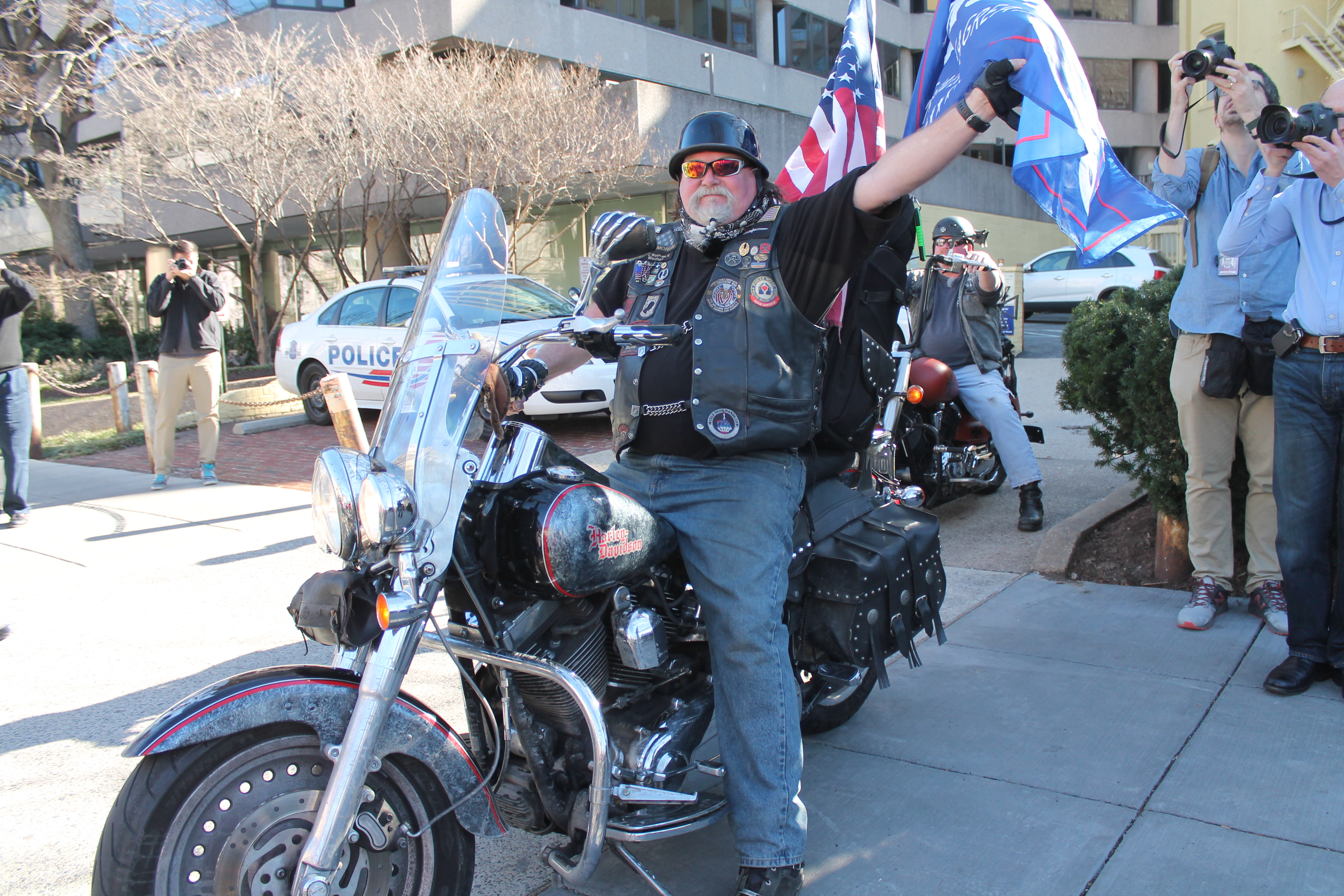
- A member of the group
- Formation: c. March 2016; 10 years ago
- Location: United States
- Members: 30,000 (2016)
- Leader: Chris Cox
- Website: www.bikersfortrump.com

Bikers for Trump is a political group in the United States that supports US president Donald Trump. The group was founded by Chris Cox and is composed primarily of motorcycle enthusiasts and was founded to advocate for Trump's policies and campaign during his presidential runs. It was founded after the Trump Chicago rally protest in March 2016, which resulted in the cancellation of a scheduled Trump campaign rally, and was said in 2016 to have 30,000 members. Bikers for Trump has been known for organizing rallies and "providing security" at Trump events. The organization gained attention for its presence during Trump's 2016 and 2020 presidential campaigns.

== History ==
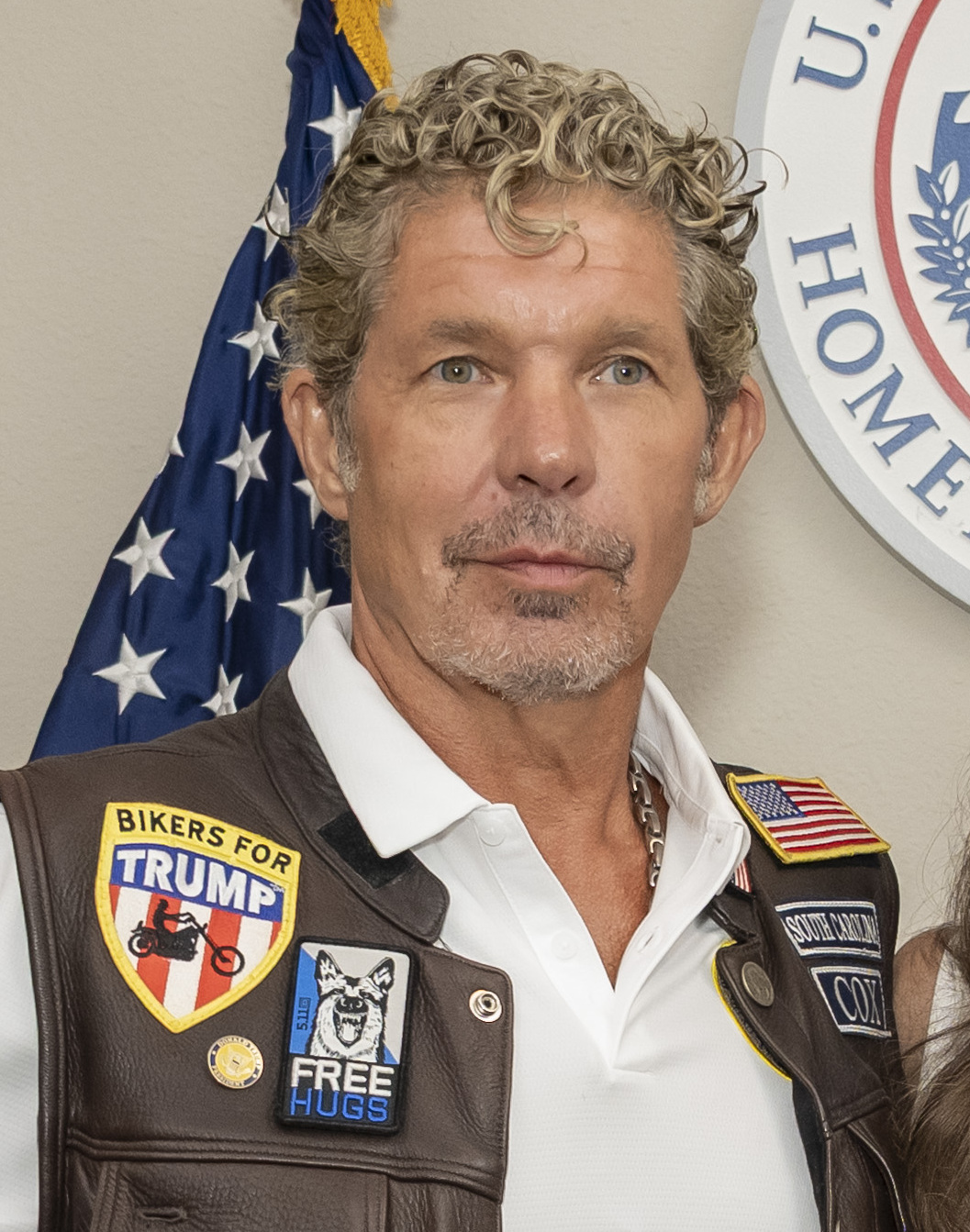
Bikers for Trump founder Chris Cox in 2025

Bikers for Trump was founded in 2016 by Chris Cox, a chainsaw artist from South Carolina. The group was established in response to protests against Donald Trump's presidential campaign and gained significant attention during the 2016 election season. The organization's formation was inspired by an incident in March 2016 when protesters forced the cancellation of a Trump rally in Chicago. Cox viewed this as an infringement on Trump's right to free speech.

One of the group's most notable appearances was at the 2016 Republican National Convention in Cleveland, Ohio. Bikers for Trump announced plans to send members to the convention with the goal to help maintain order and support local law enforcement.

In 2019, Bikers for Trump converted from a grassroots movement to a political action committee (PAC) to more formally engage in political activities and fundraising.

During the 2020 election cycle, the group continued to organize rallies and events in support of Trump's re-election bid.

From January 2021 to December 2022, they raised $427,345.65 in donations. Other records show that Save America, a leadership PAC created by Donald Trump to finance his election campaigns, disbursed $100,000 to Bikers for Trump from 2021 to 2022.

In 2023, the group was reportedly $81,000 in debt with less than $4,000 in cash on hand.

== Membership ==
As of 2016, Bikers for Trump claimed to have approximately 30,000 members. The group's membership consists primarily of motorcycle enthusiasts, a significant portion of whom have military or law enforcement backgrounds. Cox has estimated that as many as 70% of members have a military background.

== See also ==
- Black Voices for Trump
- Gays for Trump
- Latinos for Trump
- Students for Trump
- Women for Trump
