= Andre Soriano =

American fashion designer

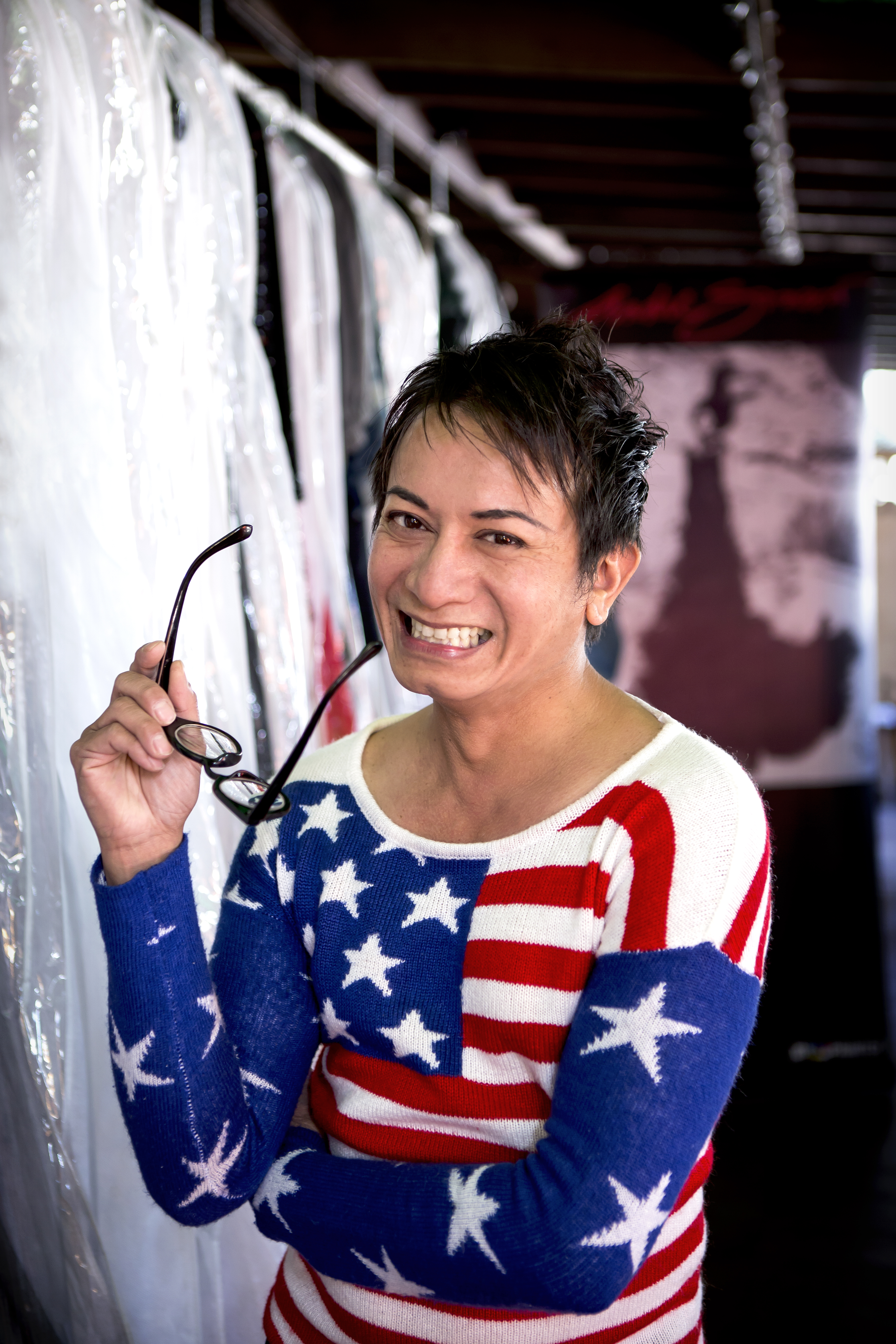
- Soriano at his San Diego home
- Born: September 17, 1970 (age 55); Philippines
- Citizenship: United States
- Education: FIDM at San Francisco
- Occupations: fashion designer, television actor
- Label: Andre Soriano
- Political party: Republican
- Website: andresoriano.com

Andre Soriano (born September 17, 1970) is an American fashion designer, specializing in couture and wedding gowns. He is also a reality television star.

== Early life and education ==
Soriano was born and raised to a Filipino family in the Philippines.

He grew up in a family of four with a mother who designed clothes for his family and taught him to make clothes. He immigrated to the United States at an early age.

Soriano served as president of his high school's fashion club. He attended the Fashion Institute of Design and Merchandising in San Francisco.

== Television ==
In 2013, he competed on the first season of Styled to Rock.

== Fashion ==
Soriano opened his first clothing store in San Francisco, which specialized in couture gowns. The store closed in 2008 after he moved to San Diego with his husband.

Andre Soriano's first runway show was at San Diego Fashion Week. In 2014, Soriano was featured at Style Fashion Week L.A. officially known as Los Angeles Fashion Week, showcasing his a pre-fall collection. His models included celebrities such as Jessica Sanchez and María Conchita Alonso. He was praised for his Heiress collection at Style Fashion Week.

Soriano eventually opened an atelier in Occoquan, Virginia.

Soriano's swimwear line has been worn by Maitland Ward. He is also well known for his luxury bridal wear. Soriano designed a dress for singer Joy Villa for the 2015 Grammy Awards made entirely of orange construction fencing that attracted media attention. He was also featured in Vanity Fair.

In 2024, Soriano designed a dress collection inspired by First Ladies of the United States, which premiered at the 2024 Glitz & Glamour charity gala.

In 2025, Soriano designed a dress for Miss America 2025 Abbie Stockard, who wore it to Secretary of Health and Human Services Robert F. Kennedy Jr.’s inaugural ball.

== Politics ==
Soriano has publicly voiced support for the LGBT community. Being a supporter of United States president Donald Trump, he designed a gown for Joy Villa for the 2017 Grammy Awards in support of Donald Trump's 2016 presidential campaign.

In 2020, Soriano again created a dress worn by Villa supporting Donald Trump's 2020 presidential campaign.

== Personal life ==
Soriano was married to Thomas Gamez Brown, a contractor. Brown died from cancer, inspiring Soriano to organize the Glitz & Glamour charity gala, which supports charities such as We Will Survive Cancer and Children's National Hospital.
