= Gays for Trump =

LGBT organization to support the presidency of Donald Trump

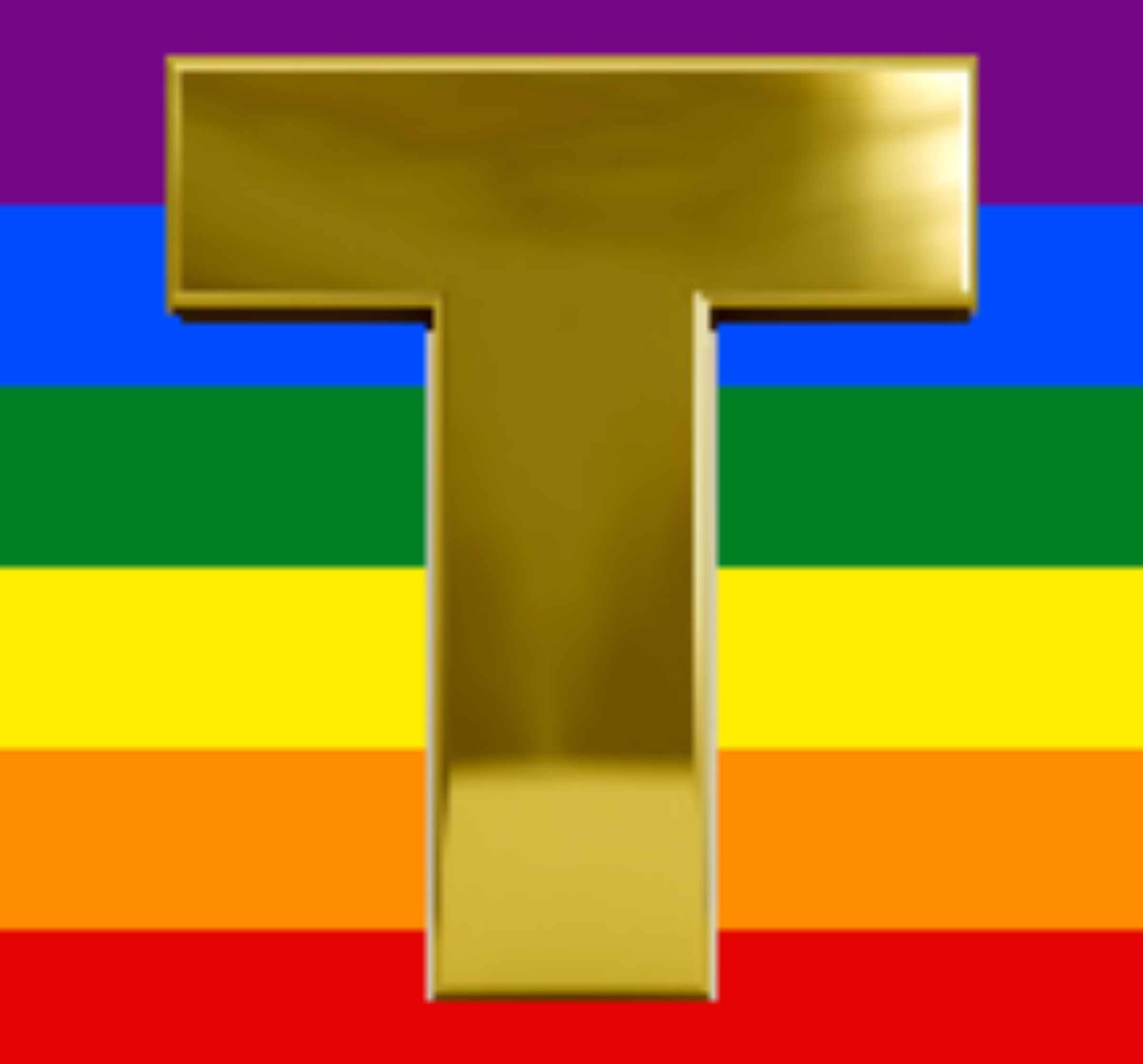
- The organization's logo

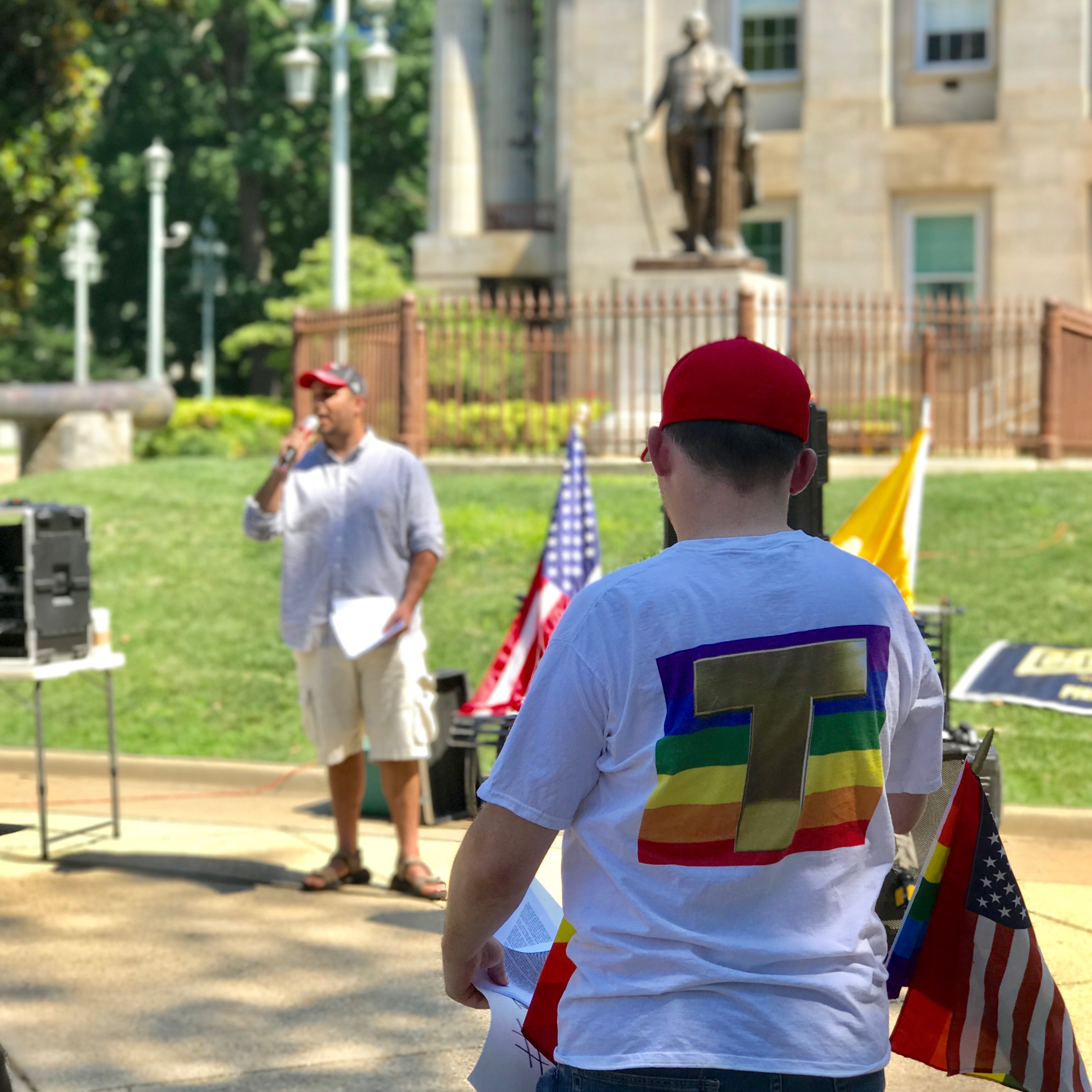
- Gays for Trump members in March Against Sharia in Raleigh, June 10, 2017
- Formation: February 11, 2016; 10 years ago
- Founder: Peter Boykin
- Type: LGBT conservatism Trumpism
- Location: United States
- President: Peter Boykin
- Website: gaysfortrump.org

Gays for Trump is an American LGBTQ organization that supports the U.S. President Donald Trump and his administration. Peter Boykin is the founder and serves as president of the organization.

== Activities ==
On July 19, 2016, Gays for Trump hosted a party, called "Wake Up!", at the Wolstein Center, in Cleveland, Ohio, during the 2016 Republican National Convention. Speakers at the party were Milo Yiannopoulos and Pam Geller, and the VIP guests included Ann Coulter, Amy Kremer, Lisa De Pasquale, Genevieve Wood, Geert Wilders, and Roger Stone. Richard B. Spencer also attended the party.

On January 20, 2017, Gays for Trump hosted an inauguration party, called "Gays for Trump DeploraBall Gala", which was held at the Bolger Center Hotel in Potomac, Maryland. The party celebrated the inauguration of Donald Trump to the presidency of the United States. Some Gays for Trump events have been funded by Jeff Giesea.

On March 4, 2018, Gays for Trump held a national "March4Trump" rally in the District of Columbia.

In an interview with Uncloseted Media in January 2025, Peter Boykin, the founder of Gays for Trump, still supported Trump, but said that he was "talking to the wrong people when it comes to queer and trans issues".

== See also ==
- DeploraBall
- Deplorable Pride
- Gays for Putin!
- LGBTQ conservatism in the United States
- LGBTQ protests against Donald Trump
