= LGBTQ protests against Donald Trump =

American protests organized by the LGBTQ community

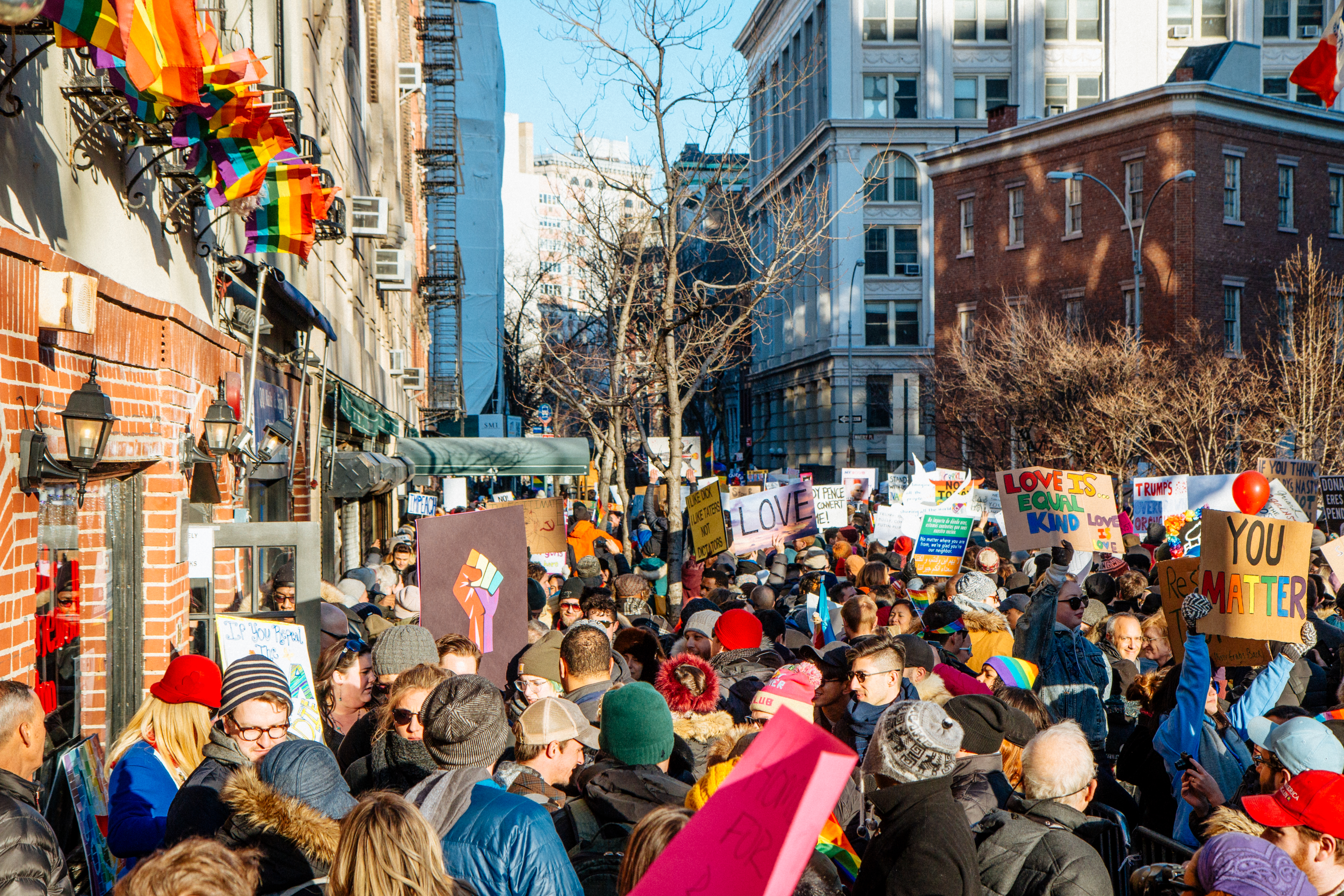
LGBT Solidarity Rally in front of the Stonewall Inn, February 4, 2017

There were several protests organized by the LGBTQ community against the policies of United States President Donald Trump and his administration.

== Protests ==
=== Pre-inauguration ===
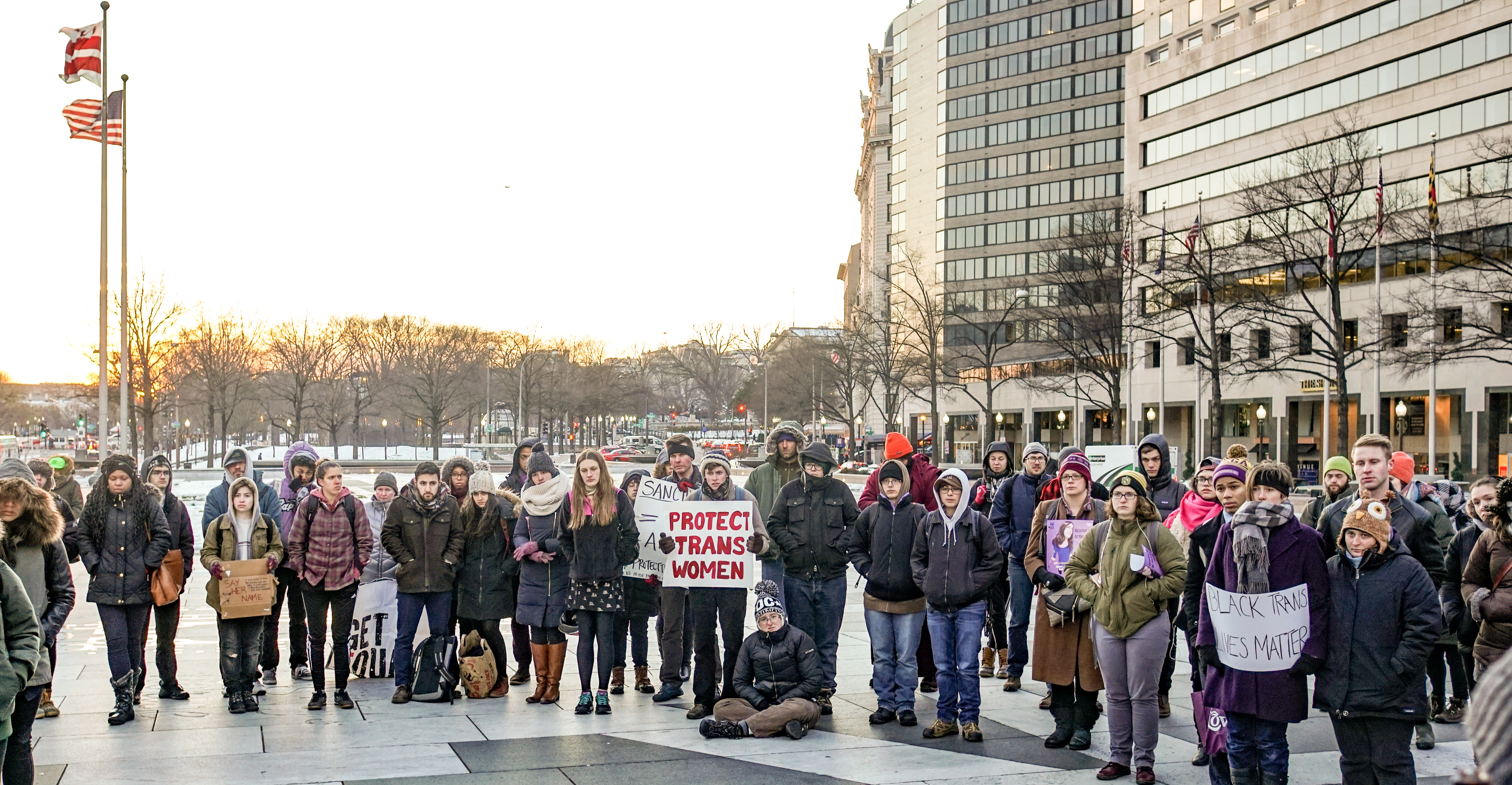
Protect Trans Women Day of Action, Washington, D.C., March 2017

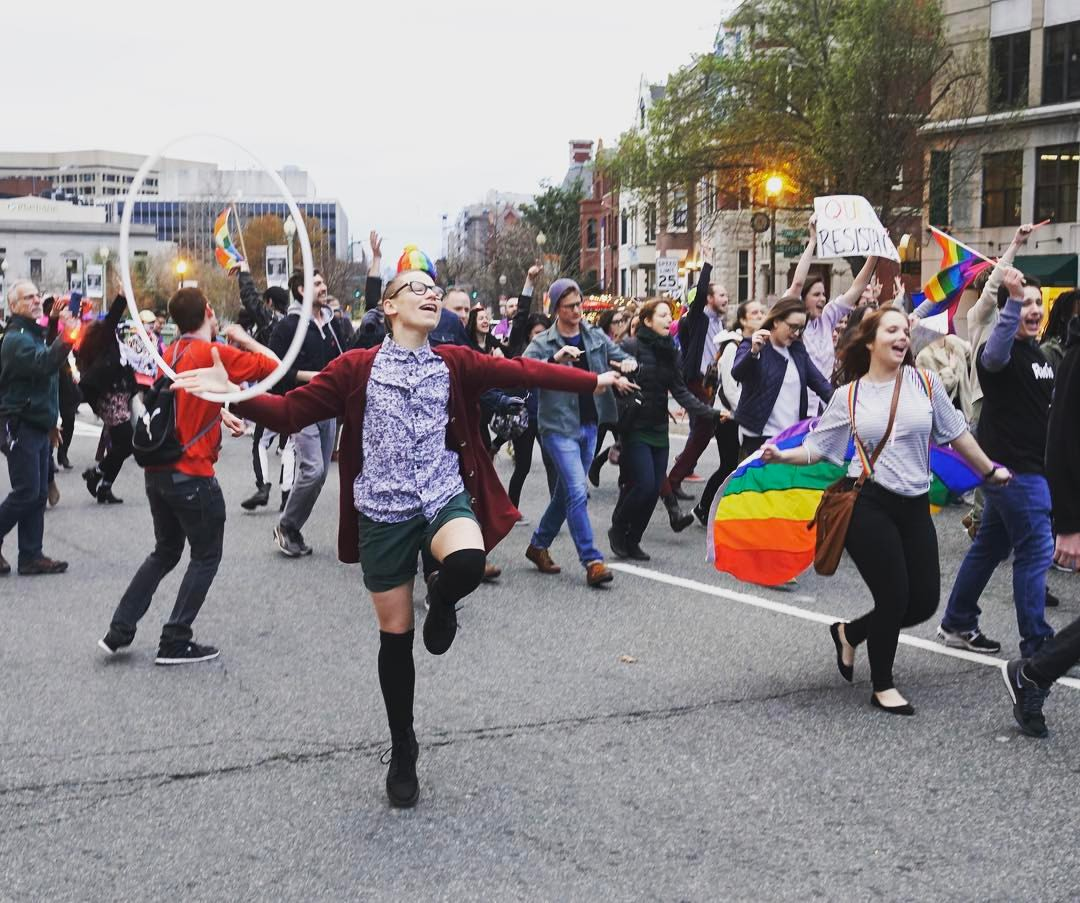
Queer dance party participants outside Ivanka Trump's house in Washington, D.C.

In August 2016, gay rights activists and religious leaders protested against then presidential candidates Marco Rubio and Donald Trump, who were scheduled to speak at the "Rediscovering God in America Renewal Project" event in Orlando, Florida.

In January 2017, prior to Trump's inauguration, Werk for Peace organized a dance party outside the house of Vice President elect Mike Pence. The event was attended by a few hundred LGBTQ+ and allies.

=== Post-inauguration ===
Following Trump's inauguration, a queer dance party was hosted by Werk for Peace and protesters with the '#DisruptJ20' coalition outside the inauguration security checkpoint at the intersection of 13th and E Streets in Washington, D.C. In Tel Aviv, hundreds of Israeli gay rights and anti-occupation activists rallied outside the U.S. Embassy, expressing solidarity with the 2017 Women's March.

On February 2, 2017, an LGBT anti-Trump rally was held in West Hollywood. On the same day, dozens of Baltimore residents protested against "both by alleged drafts of orders that would target the lesbian, gay, bisexual and transgender community, and by actual orders they feel target other vulnerable communities such as Muslims, refugees and immigrants".

On February 3, an LGBT "dance protest" against the Trump administration's policies was held outside the Trump International Hotel in downtown Washington, D.C. The event was organized by WERK for Peace and attracted several hundred participants.

On February 4, thousands of protesters gathered outside the Stonewall Inn in New York City. The demonstration marked the first large rally organized primarily by and for gay and transgender people since Trump's inauguration.

Trump's elimination of protections for transgender people promoted hundreds to protest outside the White House. In late February, after the Trump administration reduced protections for transgender students in public schools, demonstrators planned a " Stand Up for Transgender Rights" rally in Chicago.

In March 2017, Christopher Street West, which organizes Los Angeles Pride annually, said this year's pride parade is being cancelled in lieu of the national LGBT Resist March.

In April 2017, hundreds of LGBT activists held a "dance party" outside Ivanka Trump and Jared Kushner's house in Washington, D.C., to protest Trump's policies on climate change.

== See also ==
- Gays for Trump
- LGBTQ conservatism in the United States
- National Pride March
